= Endzeit Bunkertracks =

Compilation album series

Endzeit Bunkertracks is an aggrotech/electro-industrial compilation album series featuring exclusive, deleted and/or hard-to-find tracks. The first volume, or "act", (released 21 March 2005 by the record label Alfa Matrix) consists of 60 tracks, 50 of them being exclusive. Endzeit Bunkertracks follows a style where the album is divided into four "sessions": Evil, Torture, Damage and Death. The second act was released on 11 May 2006, and the third on 26 November 2007. All three came in 4-CD boxes, limited to 1, 666 copies. The fourth volume was released on 13 February 2009.

== Endzeit Bunkertracks: Act I ==
Endzeit Bunkertracks: Act I

Compilation album by VA
- Released: 2005
- Recorded: 2005
- Genres: aggrotech electro-industrial Industrial; Electrogoth
- Label: Alfa Matrix

Endzeit Bunkertracks: Act I peaked at #1 on the German Alternative Charts (DAC) and ranked #14 on the DAC Top Albums of 2005.

=== Evil Session ===
- Shnarph! – Reden und Atmen (Kurz)
- Hocico – Born to be [Hated] (Original Odium)
- Glis – Disappear! (Noir Machine Mix)
- Headscan – Dead Silver Sky (Biometric)
- Mnemonic – Humiliation (Club Mix)
- C-Drone-Defect – Fashion Victim (Just Greed Version)
- Noisuf-X – Happy Birthday
- Ayria – My Revenge on the World
- Hioctan – Dogma
- Plastic Noise Experience – Rotten People
- Pail – Que Hable el Silencio
- Punto Omega – Punto Omega (Run Level Zero Mix)
- Die Sektor – Scraping the Flesh (Alternate Mix)
- Cyclone B – Razor
- Neon Cage Experiment – Surrender (1.0)

=== Torture Session ===
- Suicide Commando – Cause of Death: Suicide (Club Edit)
- Skoyz – Distress/Signal (Vision Mix by Infekktion)
- Virtual><Embrace – Dark Room
- Combichrist – Tractor
- Neikka RPM – Storm of Hell (Complete the Fear)
- [:SITD:] – Lebensborn (Autoaggression Mix)
- Sero.Overdose – Wir (Suicide Commando Mix)
- Assemblage 23 – Infinite (Glis Mix)
- XP8 – Straight Down (Dunkelwerk Mix)
- Diskonnekted – Danger (Aggressive Mix)
- Aslan Faction – Weep for Me (Auspex Mix)
- sang.ræl – A Brighter Day
- !AïBoFoRcEn<- featuring à;GRUMH... – Chaos - Insect (Bloody Mix)
- Fractured – Only Human Remains
- Winterstahl – Delusion

=== Damage Session ===
- Tamtrum – Le Son de la Pluie
- Implant – Drugs vs. Violence (C-Drone-Defect Mix)
- Run Level Zero – Under the Gun (Cal .50 Remix by X-Fusion)
- God Module – Resurrection Resurrected (Livevil Version)
- X-Fusion – C'mon Devil (Slow Version)
- Nebula-H featuring Aluben – Hypnos vs F.K.
- Terrorfakt – A.L.F. (accessory Mix)
- S.I.N.A. – Glamourboy
- Dunkelwerk – Hope's Heaven (Short Cut)
- Grendel – Soilbleed (v.2)
- Diverje – Enough to Destroy
- Tactical Sekt – Awaken the Ghost (1st Awakening Edit)
- Noise Process – Ascend
- MinDecease – Despair (Infected Mix)
- Project-X – Lies 2k2 (Punto Omega Remix)

=== Death Session ===
- yelworC – Doom of Choronzon
- The Retrosic – New World Order
- Agonoize – Sick
- Lok-8 – Defy (Edit)
- Wumpscut – The March of the Dead
- Re Agent – Heaven Falling (Rapid Descent Mix)
- FGFC820 – Existence
- Dive – Heart and Soul
- Unter Null – Sick Fuck
- Dioxyde – Invasive Therapy
- Preemptive Strike 0.1 – Lethal Defence Systems
- Stark – Medicine (Doctors and Nurses Mix)
- Derma-Tek – Lost Cause (Grendel Mix)
- Synaptic Defect – Wake Up!
- Agonised by Love – After Dark (She Came) (Glis Mix)

== Endzeit Bunkertracks: Act II ==
Endzeit Bunkertracks: Act II

Compilation album by VA
- Released: 2006
- Recorded: 2006
- Genres: aggrotech electro-industrial Industrial; Electrogoth
- Label: Alfa Matrix

Endzeit Bunkertracks: Act II peaked at #2 on the German Alternative Charts (DAC) and ranked #9 on the DAC Top Albums of 2006.

=== Evil Session ===
- The Retrosic – The Storm
- X-Fusion – Witness of Your Decease
- Glis – Dead Set [7 AM]
- Soman – Ruler
- Monolith – 50360329
- T.H. Industry – Die Wut
- I:Scintilla – Havestar (CombiChrist Mix)
- Noisuf-X – Jezebel (BT-Mix)
- <endif> – Sleeper Cell
- Stray – Intoxicate
- Kobold – Rubicon
- Neikka RPM featuring Implant – Find a Way
- Die Sektor – Mother Hunger
- Diskonnekted featuring Johan van Roy – Religion (Mildreda Mix)
- Dioxyde – Words of Judas (Supreme Court Mix)
- Winterstahl – Self Deception (Hard Version)

=== Torture Session ===
- Negri Bodies – I.T.D.
- Suicide Commando – Bleed for Us All (unter Null Mix)
- Heimatærde – Gib Mir
- Inure – Subversive (Corrupted Re-Edit)
- Necro Facility – Downstairs
- Mentallo and the Fixer – Driving off a Cliff with a Cult (An Old Friend Nearly Killed Me Mix)
- Index AI – Butterfly Houses (Edit 2)
- FÏX8:SËD8 – Monolith
- Alien Produkt – Acceso Denegado (Vigilante Mix)
- Klutæ – We are Sinners (Made in Denmark Mix)
- Distorted Memory – God's Wrath
- Dunkelwerk – Dresden (Reduced)
- Modulate – Das Bunker
- Shnarph! – Ausgebrannt
- Tactical Sekt – Beslan
- Retractor – Possessions (Dawn of Ashes Mix)

=== Damage Session ===
- Necrotek – Spectre
- Skalpell – Sanatorium
- C/A/T – Smashed
- S.I.N.A. – Bewegungsablauf (Floor 4 Version)
- Isis Signum featuring Neikka RPM – Technique (Club Mix)
- Zombie Girl – Creepy Crawler
- Die Form – Bite of God 2006
- Plastic Noise Experience – I Feel Love (7”)
- Headscan – Terra Incognita (Sojourn)
- Wumpscut – Jesus Antichristus (Cerebral Apoplexy Mix)
- Life Cried – As We Decay
- E.S.R. – Nothing Stays
- FGFC820 – Pray
- Thirteenth Exile – Diseasespreader (Filthy Bitch Mix)
- Leæther Strip – Slam (The Happy Dance Version)
- Orange Sector – Tanzbefehl (Urban Remix by Heimatærde)

=== Death Session ===
- Neue Weltumfassende Resistance – Drache und Baum
- Implant featuring Unter Null – You Push Me
- Caustic – Digital Mangina
- Reaper – Angst
- Carnivora – Motivation for the Unseen Things
- Revolution State – Deny
- Tamtrum – La Menthe Vénéneuse
- Iambia – Chaosmancer (6,66 Mix by Noid of Siva Six)
- Terror Punk Syndicate – Dysmorphia
- Inertia – Slow Motion (Aslan Faction Mix)
- sang.ræl – Prophetic
- Trial – Für Zwei (Bunker Mix)
- Morphine Shot – My Legions
- Unter Null – Sick Fuck (Aesthetic Perfection Mix)
- Lujhboia – Looser's Letter (Ammonium Remix)
- Dawn of Ashes – The Suffering

== Endzeit Bunkertracks: Act III ==
Endzeit Bunkertracks: Act III

Compilation album by VA
- Released: 2008
- Recorded: 2008
- Genres: aggrotech electro-industrial Industrial; Electrogoth
- Label: Alfa Matrix

=== Evil Session ===
- Nachtmahr – Boom Boom Boom
- Noisuf-X – Hit Me Hard (As Hard as You Can Mix)
- Krzon. – Dead or Alive
- Kombat Unit – We are Machines (Rumble Remix by Soman)
- Leæther Strip – Battleground 07 (Rumsfeld Mix)
- Wynardtage – Praise the Fallen (Acylum Mix)
- Uberbyte – Total War
- Cylab – Dented Halo (Panel Beaten Remix by Skinjob)
- Acretongue – Estranged
- Helalyn Flowers – E-Race Generation (Angelspit Mix)
- The Judas Coven – Burn Your Soul
- Modulate – Sullfuck
- Caustic – Mmm Papscraper I Love You (Cervello Elettronico Mix)
- Neikka RPM – Umbrae Sub Noctem (Endzeit Mix)
- Angels On Acid – Misery Loves Company
- Unter Null – Journey (V1)

=== Torture Session ===
- Faderhead – Dirtygirrrls / Dirtybois (Modulate Mix)
- Soman – Mask
- SAM – Arm of Justice (Rough Mix)
- Implant – There is a Riot Going On
- Grendel – Hate This (X-Fusion Mix)
- Suicide Commando – Hate Me (Leæther Strip Mix)
- FGFC820 – Anthem (Steinkind Mix)
- Dunkelwerk – Ungethuem (Edit)
- Trimetrick – Bitch from Hell (DJ1)
- Skoyz – Distress Signal (C-Drone-Defect Mix)
- Painbastard – Nyctophobia (Straftanz Mix)
- Essence of Mind – Different
- FabrikC – Exorcism
- Detune X – Pure Evil (Hardbeat Mix)
- C/A/T – Enhancer (Cervello Elettronico Mix)
- Banister – Taste of Flesh

=== Damage Session ===
- Radium226 – Nuclear Violation
- Prototype – I Hate You
- Acylum – Rape (Exclusive Edit)
- Endif vs. Replogen – Last Tribe
- Complex Mind – Infiltrat
- Sebastian Komor – Das Oontz
- Shnarph! – Virus
- Experiment Haywire – Game Called Life
- Splatter Squall – Shadows
- [:SITD:] – Stammheim (Edit)
- Ayria – The Gun Song (Essence of Mind Mix)
- X-Fusion – Rotten to the Core (Solitary Experiments Remix)
- 32Crash – Lone Ranger (C-Drone-Defect Mix)
- Monolith – All Over (Ah Cama-Sotz Mix)
- Cervello Elettronico – Plastic Face
- X-Rx – No More Room in Hell
- Virgins O.R. Pigeons – Existe – (Violated Virgin Remix)

=== Death Session ===
- Skinjob – Man (Mothers Against Noise)
- Schallfaktor – Menschen
- Stahlfrequenz – Nothing but a Mashine
- Alter Der Ruine – Coppin' it Sweet (Noisuf-X Mix)
- Propulsion – Extreme
- Diskonnekted – Adrenaline (Endzeit Edit)
- Dawn of Ashes – Still Born Defect (Nemesis Mix)
- Vision Anomaly feat. Stahlnebel - Anxiety Neuroses
- De Tot Cor – Strawberry Panic
- Terrorfakt – Skullfucker (Synnack Mix)
- Individual Totem – WWW
- Inure – The Offering
- Chaoskult – Numb
- C-Drone-Defect – Morituri te Salutant
- Noisex – Das ist Elektro
- Psy'Aviah – Mine (Endzeit Mix)
- Isis Signum feat. Sara Noxx – Destroy the Wall (Supreme Court Remix)

== Endzeit Bunkertracks: Act IV ==
Endzeit Bunkertracks: Act IV

Compilation album by VA
- Released: 2009
- Recorded: 2008
- Genres: aggrotech electro-industrial Industrial; Electrogoth
- Label: Alfa Matrix

=== Evil Session ===
- Faderhead – TZDV
- Nachtmahr – I Believe in Blood
- X-Rx – Die Sexualkiste der Hölle
- Alter Der Ruine – Relax and Ride It (Handlebar Mix by Memmaker) *
- Aetherfx – Leaving Hope *
- The Synthetic Dream Foundation – Blood Divine *
- Cyclone B – Human Progress *
- Mesmer's Eyes – Judgement Day *
- Wynardtage – Tragic Hero (X-Fusion Mix) *
- Virgins O.R Pigeons – Born in Sin (DJ Psycon Mix) *
- IC 434 – Back to Back (Endzeit Mix) *
- Uberbyte – Last Human *
- Angels On Acid – Now You Know *
- Alien Produkt – Virus *
- Kant Kino – We are Kant Kino *
- Stahlnebel vs Black Selket – Unsichtbar *
- Skorbut - Phantom Pain *

=== Torture Session ===
- Komor Kommando – Triggerfinger *
- SAM – World of Shit
- Phosgore – Pain Tutorial (Advanced Agony Mix) *
- Siva Six – Deep Black Will (Noisuf-X Mix)
- ReAdjust with Stahlnebel vs Black Selket - Supernatural Ability *
- Deathgression – Degenerated *
- PreEmptive Strike 0.1 – Ichthyic Ascension (Acylum Mix) *
- Dunkelwerk – Harkers Verderben (Short Cut) *
- Kobold – Blowback (Untermenschen) *
- Fractured – Nothing *
- Hivepolitiks – Wake Up *
- @VX feat. mind.in.a.box – Transformation *
- E-Thik – Schleichfahrt *
- Isis Signum feat. Sara Noxx – Energy (Supreme Court Mix) *
- Diskonnekted – Adrenaline (XP8 Mix) **
- Detroit Diesel – When Darkness Falls *
- Menschdefekt with Stahlnebel vs Black Selket – Stalingrad *

=== Damage Session ===
- Acretongue – Voyeur *
- Psy'Aviah feat. Leæther Strip – Sweetheart Revenge (Endzeit Mix) *
- Patenbrigade: Wolff – Stalinallee (Jugendklub Mix) *
- Industriegebiet – Sex Mit Einer Leiche (Soman Rmx)
- Noisuf-X – Last Dance *
- Modulate – Hard And Dirty (SAM Mix) *
- Novastorm – Blow Job
- Acylum – Schmerzpervers *
- Unter Null – Broken Heart Cliché *
- Schwarzblut – Muss Es Eine Trennung Geben *
- Plastic Noise Experience – Zu Nah (Suicide Commando Mix)
- Angelspit – Girl Poison (I:Scintilla Mix) *
- Essence Of Mind – Nightmare *
- Zombie Girl – The Darkness (Komor Kommando Mix) *
- Punto Omega – Fabricantes De Miedo *
- FGFC820 – The Heart Of America (Mesmer's Eyes Mix) *
- Krystal System – I Love My Chains (Mesmer's Eyes Mix) *

=== Death Session ===
- Memmaker – Death Comes (Rotersand Mix) *
- Ex.Es – Access To The Ex.Es (Pure Adrenaline Mix) *
- Shaun F – Drty Fckn Dsko (Hard Version) *
- Shaolyn – Face Down *
- Monolith – Attack Of The Ants *
- SHNARPH! – Eine Tolle Predigt
- C-Drone-Defect – Mundus Vult Decipi *
- Afterparty – Manbaby *
- Heimatærde – Vater (Aura Lussus Mixtura)
- Straftanz – Tanzt Kaputt, Was Euch Kaputt Macht! (Straftanz Original)
- Diffuzion – Fire (EFF DST Rmx) **
- Cylab – Dragonfly Dream *
- L'Âme Immortelle – Es Tut Mir Leid (Entschuldigung Mix By Grendel) **
- Leæther Strip – Cast Away 09 (Twenty Mix) *
- Neikka RPM feat. Leæther Strip – Warped (Terror Mix) *
- Retractor – Annihilation (Preemptive Strike 0.1 Remix) *
- Dym – Government Stomp! (Overplayed Remix) *

== Endzeit Bunkertracks: Act V ==
Endzeit Bunkertracks: Act V

Compilation album by VA
- Released: 2010
- Recorded: 2009
- Genres: aggrotech electro-industrial Industrial; Electrogoth
- Label: Alfa Matrix

=== Disc 1 [evil] ===
- Captive Six - Noizemaker (Edit) *
- Suicide Commando - Die Motherfucker Die (Modulate Mix) *
- Studio-X - To Hell *
- Shaolyn - More Bass in All Frequencies *
- Ex.Es - Orgasmofobia (Edit) *
- Freakangel - God’s Blind Game (Edit) *
- Mordacious - Unknown *
- Deadcibel - One of 47 *
- amGod - On the Hunt (Short Mix) *
- Industriegebiet - Erniedrigung *
- Alien Vampires - Evil Will Always Find U *
- SAM - Bull Fucking Shit *
- Xperiment - Inside the Flesh *
- Larva - Come with Me *
- Dolls of Pain - Addiction (Endzeit Version) *
- Stahlnebel vs. Black Selket - Sick *
- Centhron - Amok *

=== Disc 2 [torture] ===
- Virgins O.R Pigeons Gotta Get Mad *
- Armageddon Dildos House of Pain (Freakangel Mix) *
- Combichrist All Pain is Gone
- Nachtmahr War On The Dancefloor
- Menschdefekt Psycho Bitch *
- Terrorfrequenz Virus Wut (Endzeit Version) *
- De Tot Cor Mädchenliebe *
- iVardensphere Sentient Wave Form *
- Experiment Haywire Mean Enough Hot Enough (Studio-X Mix) *
- Diffuzion C.S. *
- Beati Mortui Soulreaper *
- Uberbyte Dein Himmel *
- Leæther Strip Compassion (Kant Kino Mix) *
- Siva Six vs. Iambia 299 Hits (Fucking Shite Mix) *
- Aiboforcen feat. Acylum Blood in Your Face *
- My Life with the Thrill Kill Kult Death Threat (Bahntier Mix) *
- The Ludovico Technique This Life *

=== Disc 3 [damage] ===
- R.I.P. (Roppongi Inc. Project) Temporary Evacuation 27.04.86 *
- Xykogen Mthrfkr *
- Sonic Introversion Please Yourself *
- Cervello Elettronico Player (Euromix) *
- [:SITD:] Rot (SAM Remix) *
- Unter Null I Can’t be the One (Ex.Es Mix) *
- Pouppee Fabrikk Symptom (Hard Cut Mix) *
- Ayria Bad List (Freakangel Mix) *
- Wynardtage Mask (Sleetgrout Endzeit Mix) *
- X-Fusion House of Mirrors
- C/A/T Live with Myself (Edit) *
- Acylum Raise Your Fist (Bunker Edit) *
- Schwarzblut Das Mandat *
- Das Ich Das Bunkerlied *
- Heimataerde Mutter **
- Suono Monster *
- Extize Hellektrostar (Reaper Mix) **

=== Disc 4 [death] ===
- Mesmer’s Eyes 1747 *
- The Chemical Sweet Kid Tears of Blood *
- Formalin Yuppiescum *
- Feindflug Ersatzteil **
- Dunkelwerk Croatoan (Very Short Cut) **
- Syndika:Zero Metaphor (Endzeit) *
- Haushetaere Sunshine is my Destroyer *
- Trimetrick Black Elektro *
- Noisuf-X White Noise (Bunker Edit) *
- Antythesys Suicide Music *
- Neikka RPM Warped (Endzeit Attack) *
- Katastroslavia Completely Normal *
- Plasmodivm Hypocrisy is Under Control (2.0) *
- Psy'Aviah Anger Management (Endzeit Edit) *
- Grendel Chemicals & Circuitry (Komor Kommando Mix)
- Kant Kino Stille! *
- Epinephrin Energie *
