= Modulate (band) =

English electronic dance music group

- Origin: Manchester, England
- Years active: 2003–present
- Labels: Metropolis Records, Infacted
- Members: Geoff Lee, Steve Wilkins (Live)
- Past members: Martin Fey (2006–2007), Marc Martinez (2007–2008), Gregor Beyerle, Rhys Hughes
- Website: www.modulateonline.com

Modulate is the studio project of Manchester-based DJ Geoff Lee. They are an Electronic dance music group from Manchester, England. Their sound blends elements of various styles including Electro, Rave, Industrial music, Trance music and Hard dance. The band is signed to Metropolis Records (North America) and Infacted Recordings (Europe/RoW). Modulate live shows also features Steve Wilkins

== History ==
Modulate released several tracks on compilations in 2006; New Input Noise, Endzeit Bunkertracks Act II, and Das Bunker: Fear of a Distorted Planet.

The band signed to Infacted Recordings, Germany for the European and World market (excluding North America), and the short lived Sistinas Records for the North American market, releasing the debut Skullfuck EP in March 2007.

The Skullfuck EP went into the German Alternative Chart (DAC) and peaked at #6, and #3 in the Greek Alternative Chart giving the band what was described as "the scene's club hit of the year" in ReGen Magazine (USA).

Their debut full-length release Detonation was released in September 2008, receiving positive reviews in the alternative media and finding its way into the scene's DJ boxes across the globe. The album spent nearly 2 months in both the Top 10 of the German Alternative Chart (DAC) and the Dutch Underground Chart (DUC) and was voted by DJ's into the DAC Top 50 albums of 2008.

After scoring dancefloor success with his own material, Modulate has become one of the most popular remixers in the alternative electro scene, producing mixes for bands such as Die Krupps, Suicide Commando, Grendel, Aesthetic Perfection, Faderhead, Reaper, Soman and Nachtmahr.

The band has supported Alec Empire (UK leg Past, Present, Future tour), VNV Nation (Judgement tour) and Combichrist (What the Fuck is Wrong with You? tour) sharing the stage with bands such as Front 242, Front Line Assembly, Covenant, Die Krupps, Suicide Commando, And One, playing nearly 100 shows in 11 countries since the release of their first EP.

== Live ==
Modulate played their first live show at the Black Celebration festival at Islington Academy, London, England, on 5 November 2006.

2007 – Toured in support of the Skullfuck EP, joining VNV Nation on the "Judgement Tour" and Combichrist on the "What The Fuck Is Wrong With You Tour".

2008 – The band played a four date headline tour in the UK as well as headlining the "I am Darkness" festival in Tilburg, Netherlands.

2009 – Modulate supported Alec Empire on the UK leg of the Past, Present, Future tour. As well, they played the Summer Darkness festival in Utrecht, Netherlands, before heading over to America to headline a night on the Gothic Cruise festival aboard the Carnival Legend.

2010 – Modulate delivered a co-headline set at the Wave-Gotik-Treffen festival in Leipzig, Germany. The band headlined the DV8 Festival in July in York, England and co-headlined the High Voltage Festival in Frankfurt, Germany, on 31 October, before a headline show at the legendary Slimelight club, London, on New Year's Eve.

In 2011, Modulate continued in the studio and hit the road again with well received sets at the Resistanz (England) and Kinetik Festival (Canada) festivals plus their own headline "Robots" tour throughout Europe.

== Discography ==
Albums

- Detonation (2008) Metropolis Records (North America), Infacted Recordings (Europe / R.O.W.), (2009) Gravitator Records (Russia)

EPs

- Skullfuck EP (2007) Sistinas (North America), Infacted Recordings (Europe/R.O.W)
- Skullfuck Limited Edition EP (2007) Sistinas (North America)
- Robots (2012) Metropolis Records (North America), Infacted Recordings (Europe/R.O.W)

== Remixes for Artists ==
- Neikka RPM – Sacrifice feat Claus Larsen (Leaether Strip) (2006)
- Reaper – Execution of your mind (2007)
- Schallfaktor – End of Love (2007)
- Faderhead – Dirty Grrrls, Dirty Bois (2007)
- XP8 – Download Me (2007)
- Soman – Divine (2008)
- Die Krupps – Du Lebst Nur Einmal (2008)
- SAM – Hardbeat Trauma (2008)
- Grendel – Chemicals and Circuitry (2009)
- Nachtmahr – Tanzdiktator (2010)
- Suicide Commando – Die Motherfucker Die (2010)
- Aesthetic Perfection – Devil in the Details (2011)
- God Module – Devil’s Night (2011)
- Surgyn – Hit the Nerve (2011)
- Grendel – Timewave Zero (2012)
- Alien Vampires - Harsh Drugs & BDSM (2014)

== Compilations ==
- Das Bunker: Fear Of A Distorted Planet (2xCD, Comp) Skullfuck (Beta Mix) Das Bunker 2006
- 'Endzeit Bunkertracks [Act II] (4xCD, Comp, Ltd, Car + Box, Ltd) Das Bunker Alfa Matrix 2006
- New [Input] Noise (CD) Biomorph Hellektroempire 2006
- Endzeit Bunkertracks [Act III] (4xCD, Comp, Car + Box) Skullfuck Alfa Matrix 2007
- Infactious Vol. Three (CD, Mixed, Ltd) Skullfuck (Combichrist Remix)(Infacted Recordings 2007)
- Materia Fria (CD, Comp) Haunted Faktory Sistinas, Crunch Pod 2007
- Nacht Der Maschinen Volume One (CD, Ltd) Kommune 1 Infacted Recordings 2007
- Orkus Compilation 28 (CD, Smplr) Skullfuck (ESA Mix) Orkus 2007
- Zillo Club Hits Vol. 12 (2xCD, Dig) Kommune 1 Zillo 2007
- Extreme Lustlieder 2 (CD, Comp) Hard And Dirty UpScene, Indigo (2) 2008
- Extreme Störfrequenz 2 (CD, Comp) Bass Alert UpScene, Indigo (2) 2008
- Infacted 4 (2xCD, Comp) Bass Alert Infacted Recordings 2008
- Nacht Der Maschinen VolumeTwo (CD, Comp, Ltd) Skullfuck (Combichrist Remix) Infacted Recordings 2008
- Endzeit Bunkertracks [Act – IV] (4xCD, Comp + Box, Ltd) Hard And Dirty (SAM Mix) Alfa Matrix 2009
