= Aesthetic Perfection =

American electronic musical project

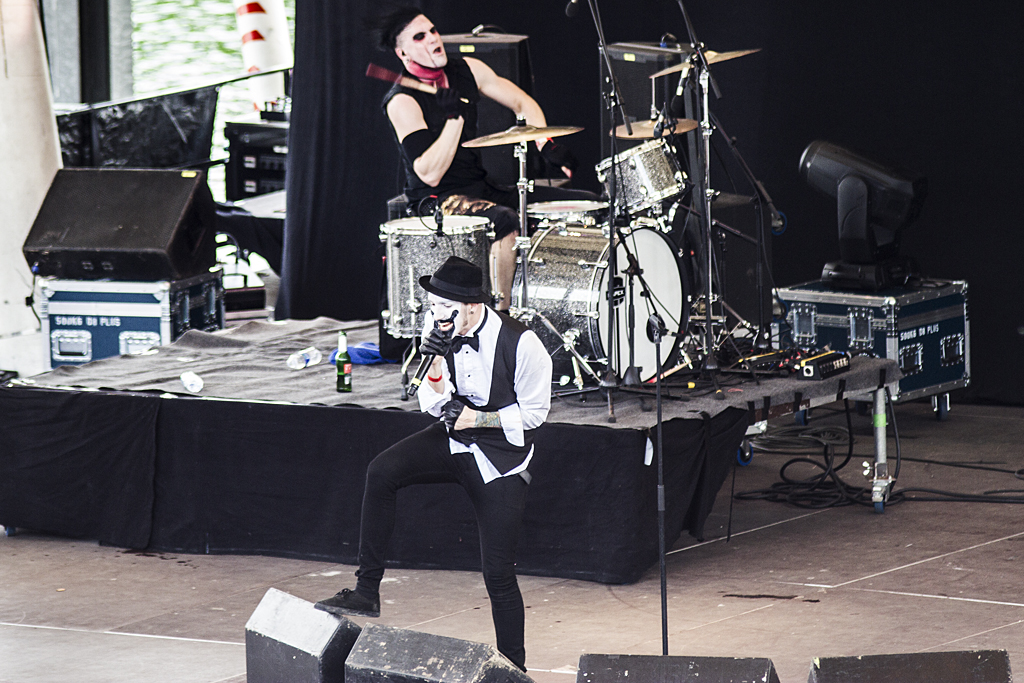
- Aesthetic Perfection - During Blackfield Festival 2013 in Gelsenkirchen, Germany

Background information
- Origin: Los Angeles, California
- Genres: Synthpop, EBM, aggrotech (early)
- Years active: 2000–present
- Labels: Metropolis; Out of Line; Close to Human Music
- Spinoffs: Necessary Response
- Members: Daniel Graves; Joe Letz; Constance Antoinette Day
- Past members: David Dutton; Tim Van Horn; Elliott Berlin
- Website: www.aesthetic-perfection.net

Aesthetic Perfection is an American-Austrian electronic musical project created by Daniel Graves in 2000. It was formed in Los Angeles, California before moving to Linz, Austria.

== Biography ==
Aesthetic Perfection was formerly signed directly to Metropolis Records in the United States and Out of Line Records in Europe, until Graves decided to run it on his independent label Close to Human Records. Additionally, the band was licensed to Gravitator Records in Russia and Death Watch Asia in Japan.

The band's third album, All Beauty Destroyed, was released on November 4, 2011, in Europe and November 8, 2011, in the United States.

On March 29, 2019, Aesthetic Perfection released its sixth album, Into the Black. Unlike previous albums which were released by labels, Into the Black was self-released. According to Graves, this was an intentional move towards running the band free of label intervention, due to a belief that the label industry model was "dying". He has talked about his experience with the difficulties of touring, including minimal revenue, logistical issues and contract arrangements that require the band to front many costs which are only recouped if the tour is successful.

== Band members ==
- Daniel Graves – vocals, keyboards, programming (2000–present)
- Joe Letz – live drums (2018–present)
- Constance Antoinette Day – live keyboards, guitars, bass (2021–present)

== Former members ==
- David Dutton – live keyboards (2008-2010, 2014–2017, 2025)
- Tim Van Horn – live drums (2009-2017, 2025)
- Elliott Berlin – live keyboards, synths (2010–2020), live keyboards, synths, guitars, bass, theremin (2019–2020)

== Discography ==
=== Studio albums ===
List of studio albums
Title	Album details
Close to Human	Released: February 22, 2005; Label: Bractune (BRAC002); Format: CD, digital download
A Violent Emotion	Released: September 26, 2008; Label: Bractune (brac006); Format: CD, digital download
All Beauty Destroyed	Released: November 8, 2011; Label: Metropolis (MET 764); Format: CD, 2×CDs, Box set, digital download
'Til Death	Released: February 11, 2014; Label: Metropolis (MET 927); Format: CD, LP, digital download
Imperfect	Released: May 12, 2015; Label: Metropolis (MET 973); Format: CD+DVD, digital download
Blood Spills Not Far from the Wound	Released: October 16, 2015; Label: Metropolis (MET 998); Format: CD, digital download
Into the Black	Released: March 29, 2019; Label: Close to Human Music; Format: CD, digital download, cassette, vinyl
MMXXI	Released: June 3, 2022; Label: Close to Human Music; Format: CD (limited copies), digital download

=== Extended plays ===
List of extended plays
Title	Album details
All Beauty Destroyed – The Remixes	Released: November 4, 2011; Label: Out of Line (OUT 519); Format: Digital download
A Nice Place to Destroy	Released: June 12, 2012; Label: Metropolis (MET 814D); Format: CD, digital download
Bad Vibes	Released: October 11, 2024; Label: Close To Human Music; Format: Digital download

=== Singles ===
List of singles
Title	Year	Album
"The Devil's in the Details"	2010	All Beauty Destroyed
"Inhuman"	2011	All Beauty Destroyed
"Smoke Trails"	2012	Non-album single
"Antibody"	2013	'Til Death
"The Dark Half"	2013	'Til Death
"Big Bad Wolf"	2013	'Til Death
"Never Enough"	2015	Blood Spills Not Far From The Wound
"LAX"	2016	Non-album singles
"Love Like Lies"	2016	Non-album singles
"Rhythm + Control"	2017	Non-album singles
"Ebb and Flow"	2018	Non-album singles
"No Boys Allowed"	2019	Into the Black
"Gods and Gold"	2019	Into the Black
"Lockdown" (with Chemical Sweet Kid)	2020	Non-album singles
"S E X"	2021	MMXXI
"Party Monster"	2021	MMXXI
"Automaton"	2021	MMXXI
"Dead Zone"	2021	MMXXI
"Gravity"	2021	MMXXI
"Happy Face"	2021	MMXXI
"A New Drug"	2021	MMXXI
"American Psycho"	2021	MMXXI
"BETRAYER"	2021	MMXXI
"Bark at the Moon"	2021	MMXXI
"Save Myself"	2021	MMXXI
"Lonesome Ghosts"	2021	MMXXI
"Blood Runs Cold"	2022	Non-album singles
"Summer Goth"	2023	Non-album singles
"Meat & Bones"	2023	Non-album singles
"Toxic"	2023	Non-album singles
"monochrome"	2024	Non-album singles
"Into the Void"	2024	Bad Vibes
"Self Inflicted"	2024	Bad Vibes

=== Music videos ===
List of music videos, showing year released and director
Title	Year	Director(s)
"The Great Depression"	2009	Hendrik S. Schmitt/Zeitschnitt
"Inhuman"	2011	Max Nadolny
"All Beauty Destroyed"	2012	Mitch Massie
"A Nice Place to Visit"	2012	Mitch Massie
"Antibody"	2013	Mitch Massie
"The Dark Half"	2013	Ronald Dembowksi
"Big Bad Wolf"	2013	Mitch Massie
"The New Black"	2014	—N/a
"Never Enough"	2015	—N/a
"LAX"	2016	—N/a
"Love Like Lies"	2017	Clint Carney
"Ebb and Flow"	2018	Everett Lee-Sung
"Bye Bye Bye"	2018	Nyxx
"No Boys Allowed"	2019	Chad Michael Ward
"Gods and Gold"	2019	Clint Carney
"Supernatural"	2020	Eulenherz Artwork
"Bark at The Moon"	2021	Chad Michael Ward
"Lonesome Ghosts"	2021	Daniel Graves

=== Other appearances ===
List of other appearances, showing year released and album
Title	Year	Album
"Sacrifice"	2002	Septic III
"I Belong to You"	2004	Machineries of Joy Vol. 3
"Surface" (Pneumatic Detach Remix)	2005	Awake the Machines Vol. 5
"Coward" (live video)	2006	Out of Line Festival Vol. 2
"Architect" (live video)	2006	Out of Line Festival Vol. 2
"Sacrifice" (live video)	2006	Out of Line Festival Vol. 2
"Living the Wasted Life" (Machineries Mix)	2007	Machineries of Joy Vol. 4
"Living the Wasted Life" (Deadbeat Remix)	2007	Extreme Sündenfall 6
"Pale" (Beta Edit)	2008	Awake the Machines Vol. 6
"Schadenfreude" (Beta Edit)	2008	Das Bunker 4: Brighter Than a Thousand Suns
"Schadenfreude" (Hexen Prozess Remix)	2009	Inquisition Process
"Want It" (XP8 featuring Daniel Graves)	2009	Want It (Single)
"The Ones" (genCAB Remix)	2010	Electronic Saviors: Industrial Music to Cure Cancer
"The Siren" (Faderhead Remix)	2010	Rock Oracle Compilation #5
"Under Your Skin" (Deadbeat Remix)	2012	Underworld: Awakening (Original Motion Picture Score)
"The Devil's in the Details" (Sthilmann Remix)	2012	Electronic Saviors: Industrial Music to Cure Cancer Volume II: Recurrence
"A Nice Place to Visit" (video)	2012	Visions of Machines
"A Nice Place to Visit" (Syndroid Remix)	2012	Electronic Saviors: Industrial Music to Cure Cancer Volume III: Remission
"Lifelight" (Rotersand featuring Aesthetic Perfection)	2012	Truth Is Fanatic Again
"Dead Tomorrow" (Bruderschaft featuring Aesthetic Perfection)	2013	Return
"Voodoo" (Nyxx featuring Aesthetic Perfection)	2018	Voodoo (Single)
"Amplify" (Avarice in Audio featuring Aesthetic Perfection)	2018	No Punishment – No Paradise
"Rhythm + Control" (Third Realm Remix)	2018	Electronic Saviors: Industrial Music to Cure Cancer Volume V: Remembrance
"This Modern World"	2019	Pieces – A Thousand Albums at the End of America: The Album Within an Album
"Shut Off" (Raygun Romance featuring Aesthetic Perfection)	2019	Get Wicked
"No Boys Allowed" (Empirion Remix)	2020	Electronic Saviors: Industrial Music to Cure Cancer Volume VI: Reflection
"Digital Deities" (X-RL7 featuring Aesthetic Perfection)	2020	Digital Deities

==== Remixes ====
List of remixes, showing year released and artist
Title	Year	Artist
"Sacrifice"	2005	Agonoize
"Sick Fuck"	2006	Unter Null
"Portrait of Homicide"	2007	Dawn of Ashes
"Still Alive"	2007	Solitary Experiments
"Our Game"	2008	Suicidal Romance
"Can't Change the Beat"	2009	Combichrist
"Crash of a Star"	2009	Wynardtage
"I Kissed a Girl"	2009	Katy Perry
"LoveGame"	2009	Lady Gaga
"Rot"	2009	[:SITD:]
"Body Flow"	2010	Interface
"Version 2"	2010	genCAB
"Art"	2010	God Module
"Kingdom of Welcome Addiction"	2010	IAMX
"Here's to You"	2010	System Syn
"Relax and Ride It"	2010	Alter Der Ruine
"Polarity"	2010	Cervello Elettronico
"Enjoy the Silence"	2010	Depeche Mode
"Dog Eat Dog"	2010	Hocico
"Paparazzi"	2010	Lady Gaga
"Gallows"	2010	Endless Sunder
"Death Cures All Pain"	2010	Suicide Commando
"Bass Down Low"	2011	Dev featuring The Cataracs
"Rise Above"	2011	00tz 00tz
"I Kill"	2011	Blackcentr
"Muv Your Dolly"	2011	XP8
"Tonight"	2011	Skold
"White Knuckle Head Fuck"	2011	Caustic
"Sharp as Stars"	2011	Surgyn
"This Is the Life"	2012	Inure
"The Iron Fist of Just Destruction" (Going Hard Remix)	2012	Everything Goes Cold
"Crash and Burn"	2012	Detroit Diesel
"Conflict Instigation"	2012	Grendel
"Wahre Liebe"	2012	Agonoize
"Robots"	2012	Modulate
"Motormouth"	2012	Mob Research
"Collider"	2012	Formalin
"Get Rid of This Life"	2013	Sleetgrout
"Engel"	2013	Rammstein
"Can You Feel My Heart?"	2013	Bring Me the Horizon
"Smell of Fear"	2013	Dead Hand Projekt
"Dead Inside"	2013	Ludovico Technique
"Goodbye"	2013	Bruderschaft
"Hotel Suicide"	2013	Rabia Sorda
"As Nations Decay"	2013	BlakOPz
"Master of Decay"	2013	3Teeth
"Use Once and Destroy" (Version : Aesthetic Perfection)	2014	Psyclon Nine
"Blitzlicht"	2014	Epinephrin
"Land of the Blind"	2014	Information Society
"Numb"	2014	CYFERDYNE
"Rise"	2014	Surveillance
"Heart On"	2014	Celldweller
"The Error Is You"	2014	Spider Lilies
"Eat You Alive"	2014	Emigrate
"Sinixtr"	2015	Mordacious
"Ice Crystal"	2015	Eisfabrik
"Parallel World"	2015	Alkemic Generator
"I Idolize You"	2015	Massive Ego
"Oh Cruel Darkness Embrace Me"	2015	IAMX
"Under Control	2015	Solar Fake
"Robots"	2015	Modulate
"Our Game"	2016	Suicidal Romance
"Bitchcraft" featuring KMFDM	2016	Victor Love
"My World"	2016	Binary Division
"Kill Your Darlings"	2016	Mesh
"Cheerful Hypocrisy"	2016	Snog
"Courtship II"	2016	HEALTH
"Journey to Storyville"	2016	Goteki
"Brother Death"	2017	[:SITD:]
"Moshpit"	2017	Attila
"Lowlife Novelties"	2017	Lovelesslust
"Hearts Against Minds"	2017	For All the Emptiness
"Gegenstrom"	2017	BodyHarvest
"Neon Dominion"	2018	Sirus
"Static"	2018	DV8R
"Functional" (Aesthetic Perfection '09 Mix)	2018	Imperative Reaction
"Romeos"	2018	Bloodhype
"Automat"	2018	Eisbrecher
"Join Us"	2019	SynthAttack
"Jigsaw"	2019	Murder Weapons
"Black Lambo"	2019	Lazerpunk
"Drums of the Machines"	2019	Jalex
"Bipolar Pop" featuring Chiasm	2019	Third Realm
"War" (Retro Orion Remix)	2019	Emigrate

== Awards and nominations ==
Award Ceremony	Year	Nominee/Work	Category	Result
Berlin Music Video Awards	2024	Summer Goth	Best Trashy	Nominated
