= Mind:state =

Swedish electronic music act

- Per Holmström of Mind:state

Background information
- Origin: Uppsala, Uppland, Sweden
- Genres: Futurepop, Synthpop, electro-industrial
- Years active: 1999-Present
- Labels: Alfa Matrix
- Members: Per Holmström
- Website: mind-state.com

Mind:state is an electronic music one man act from Sweden that popped up in the late 1990s. Influenced by electronic bands like Front 242, Assemblage 23, KMFDM and also a wide range of metal bands such as Tiamat and Darkseed, Per Holmström creates electronic music that crosses between the lines of futurepop and darker industrial.

== Biography ==
Founded in 1999, Per Holmström started working on his first demo entitled Forward. It was not until eight years later, when his first studio album DECAYED, REBUILT was released on Alfa Matrix, that the true voice of Per's work was heard. The album got both good and bad critique but became a big success in Germany and was featured on the DAC for a total of six weeks, peaking on position No. 4.

== Live line up ==
=== Current line up ===
With an ever changing line up for live play, the current line up consists of:

- Per Holmström - vocals
- Marcus Liverholm - keys
- Mathias Fogelström - drums

=== Previous live members ===
- Jonas Klåvus - keys (2004)
- Eric Klinga - keys (2004–2005)

== Discography ==
=== Albums ===
- Decayed, rebuilt (Alfa Matrix, 2007)

=== EPs ===
- BBBC2x (Alfa Matrix, 2006)

=== Compilation albums ===
- Cyberl@b 5.0 (Alfa Matrix, 2005)
- Cryonica Tanz 4.0 (Cryonica Music, 2005)
- Re:connected [2.0] (Alfa Matrix, 2006)
- Fxxk The Mainstream vol. 1 (Alfa Matrix, 2007)
