= Aetherfx =

Lucas
- Also known as: GeistFND; Sellafield; XungTekh
- Born: Nottingham, United Kingdom
- Origin: Bournemouth, United Kingdom
- Genres: Industrial; EBM; Electronic; IDM glitch
- Years active: 2005 - present
- Label: TriTech Records 2006 - 2008

Aetherfx (also Aetherfx, GeistFND, Sellafield and XungTekh) is the EBM alias of Jacob Tugby, an electronic musician based in the United Kingdom.

== Overview ==
Aetherfx was formed in 2005 alongside other lesser known project Sellafield, as an outlet for more aggressive forms of electronic music .

In 2006 Jacob signed to midlands based net-label, TriTech Records with the alias'; Sellafield and Aetherfx.

In 2008 Jacob left TriTech Records, the label disintegrated several months later ending in November 2008.

In 2009 Aetherfx track "Leaving Hope" appeared in Endzeit Bunkertracks by Belgian record label Alfa Matrix. Reaching number 1 in the DAC. This release remained in the DAC top 5 for two months. Aetherfx also produced a remix for Norwegian electro-rock/industrial band Essence of Mind, for the Watch Out E.P; which was released March 2009 on the Alfa Matrix label.

Aetherfx/Jake Tugby is also a member of Industrial Metal band - CeDigest; on Noitekk/Black Rain Records (for Europe) & Deathwatch Asia (for Japan).

== Personal life ==
Jacob was born in Nottingham, but has lived in several areas in the UK including Long Eaton, Leicester and Bournemouth; he attended Ferndown Upper School in Dorset during his high school years.
