= Sara Noxx =

German singer

- Origin: Berlin, Germany
- Genres: Electro-industrial, darkwave, electronic
- Years active: 1997–present
- Labels: Rough Trade, Prussia
- Member of: Essexx
- Website: saranoxx.com

Sara Noxx is a German musician and member of the alternative music scene. She is also a member of the band Essexx, who in 1997 were the winners of the Zillo band contest.

== Career ==
Noxx's debut solo release was the 1997 mini-album Society on Nightshade Productions.

Her 2001, the album Exxtasy reached No. 9 on the DAC. In 2003, Noxx released her instrumental album Nonvoxx. In late 2003, the album Equinoxx and the single "Colder & Colder" were released which reached the No. 1 position of all European alternative charts for several weeks.

In 2008, Noxx released a three-CD set XX-ray including numerous new interpretations, remixes and duets but also a collection of multi-lingual interpretations of her work. In 2009, her single "Superior Love" from her Intoxxication album reached No. 4 on the DAC.

To date, Noxx has released three full albums as well as numerous singles, LPs and special releases.

=== Related projects and collaborations ===
Noxx is a member of the band Essexx and is credited with remixing the song Navigator for Blutengel. She did vocals on the X-Fusion song Reap the Whirlwind, remixed by The Eternal Afflict. Her 2008 single, "Earth Song", featured guest vocals from Project Pitchfork, and reached No. 1 on the DAC. Noxx sang a duet with ASP on the song "Imbecile Anthem" for the duet/remix album Die Zusammenkunft. Her cover of "Where the Wild Roses Grow" featured world-renowned forensic biologist Mark Benecke.

== Discography ==
=== Albums, LPs and singles ===
Released on Nightshade Productions:

- Society (1997)
- Noxxious (1997)
- Paradoxx (1998)

Released on Scanner Records:

- Exxtasy (2001)
- Nonvoxx (2003)
- Colder and Colder (2003)
- Equinoxx (2003)

Released on Prussia Records (A label of Rough Trade Records):

- Earth Song (feat. Project Pitchfork) (2008)
- Superior Love (The Dark Side) (feat. 18 Summers) (2009)
- Superior Love (The Bright Side) (feat. Limahl) (2009)
- Intoxxication (2009)
- Where the Wild Roses Grow (feat. Mark Benecke) (2011)
- Weg zurück (feat. Goethes Erben) (2014)
- Entre Quatre Yeuxx (Standard & Limited Edition) (2015)
