= Dunkelwerk =

German band

- losttrooper of Dunkelwerk official pressfoto taken from www.alfa-matrix.com

Background information
- Origin: German flag
- Genres: Endzeit Electro, Dark Electro, Industrial
- Years active: 2003–present
- Label: Alfa Matrix
- Members: losttrooper
- Website: dunkelwerk.de

Dunkelwerk is the name of a German band which describes its sound as Endzeit Electro (dark electronic beats and sounds often combined with Nazism themes or horror apocalyptic scenarios and distorted vocals), referring to a genre which was originally established by bands like Wumpscut and Leæther Strip and is nowadays produced by bands like The Retrosic, Suicide Commando or Hocico. Dunkelwerk consists of only one person and is a pure studio project, not doing any live performances or any other public events. The name of the band is an old German idiom which can be translated as "dark work" or "dark factory". The producer behind Dunkelwerk has decided to work under the pseudonym "losttrooper", being restrained to offer pictures of himself.

== History ==
Dunkelwerk was signed in 2003 by the Belgian Label Alfa-Matrix. At this time the band was a first step towards a harsher direction for the label. Dunkelwerk was tipped to Alfa-Matrix by Cyrus of The Retrosic (another successful German Endzeit Electro band). Before releasing the first album, Dunkelwerk was part of several compilations worldwide and released its first single called “Die Sechste Armee” on the Square matrix 004 sampler released by Alfa-Matrix. The war theme of the single was a forerunner of the album Troops, which is often described as one of the darkest releases in the Endzeit Electro genre. Dealing with German wars, this album creates an intense atmosphere of defeat and loss while using danceable beats and marching melodies. The combination of dance music for clubs with such a difficult historical background was one reason why press for this album was banned by music magazines like Sonic Seducer in Germany (Dunkelwerk was defined as “bad entertainment” by the editing staff in 2005). In subsequent interviews, the producer explained the concept of his work and made clear statements about his intention and attitude. In the booklet attached to the cd release of Troops, he stated: “Dunkelwerk is about defeat, not about victory. We have no use for any fascist train of thought!”

Troops got positive reviews and gained some success in the worldwide industrial scene. It reached position 6 of the German DAC Charts and was also released as a limited edition with bonus remixes in a special carton box. All tracks on the album are linked to the world wars and focus on moments of defeat. The use of rare original broadcast recordings from the world wars on many songs distinguishes this band from many others. The album was mixed and mastered by Len Lemeire who worked with Anne Clark and many other electronic artists.

Besides the work on the album, the band has made several remixes for other bands and offered exclusive versions of its own songs on compilations.

The band released the second album called "Höllenbrut" in November 2009 - after the first new track was released on the sampler Re:connected Vol.2.

== Band members ==
- losttrooper - arrangement, programming, keys, vocals

== Discography ==
- Full-length albums:
  - Troops (normal one CD edition, 2005)
  - (the limited) Troops (limited two CD edition boxset with exclusive songs and remixes, poster and postcards, 2005)
  - Höllenbrut (normal one CD edition, 2009)
  - (the limited) Höllenbrut (limited two CD edition boxset with exclusive EP Nightbreeders, a sticker, poster and 12 tarot cards, 2009)
  - Waffengang (normal One-CD, 2019)
- Singles and EPs:
  - Die Sechste Armee (part of the Square Marix 004 normal CD edition, 2004)
  - Die Sechste Armee (part of the Square Marix 004 limited two CD edition boxset with bonus tracks, 2004)

== Remixes by Dunkelwerk for other bands and projects ==
- Virtual Embrace – Escape To Insane (2xcd, limited), Acquaintance (Remix by Dunkelwerk)
- Neikka RPM – Here's Your Revolution (ep CD), Here's Your Revolution (Deep Space Rescue Remix by Dunkelwerk)
- Plastic Noise Experience – Maschinenraum (ep CD), Maschinen (Remix by Dunkelwerk)
- Neikka RPM – The Gemini Prophecies (2xcd, limited), Here's Your Revolution (Remix Version 2 by Dunkelwerk)
- Crystalline Effect – Glass (2xcd), Another Rainy Day (Remix by Dunkelwerk)
- Patenbrigade:Wolff – Gefahrstoffe (single CD), Ostberliner Bauarbeiter (Remix by Dunkelwerk)
- Stereomotion – Resistance:2012 (CD), Holystigma (Remix by Dunkelwerk)
- XP8 – Endzeit Bunkertracks Act 1 (4xcd, limited boxset sampler), Straight Down (Remix by Dunkelwerk)

== Dunkelwerk tracks on compilations ==
- Endzeit Bunkertracks Act 1 (4xcd, limited boxset sampler), Hope's Haven (short cut)
- Endzeit Bunkertracks Act 2 (4xcd, limited boxset sampler), Dresden (reduced)
- Re:Connected 1 (2xcd, sampler), Bastard
- Re:Connected 2 (2xcd, sampler), Your Love (rough cut)
- Cyberlab 4 (2xcd, sampler), 2Hell (Ladykiller Mixx)
- Cryonica Tanz V.3 (2xcd, sampler), Die Sechste Armee (Club is a battlefield cut)
- deCODER 2 (CD, sampler), Die Sechste Armee (M.A.O. Mix)
- Interbreeding 3 Xenophobic (2xcd, sampler), Stahlgrab (Compact Mixx)
- Interbreeding 7 The Flash Harvest/Natural Enemies (2xcd, sampler), Bastard (Against The Beast Version)
- Sounds From The Matrix 001 (CD, promotion sampler), 2Hell (Hellbreaker Mixx)
- Sounds From The Matrix 002 (CD, promotion sampler), Bastard (short cut)
- Sounds From The Matrix 003 (CD, promotion sampler), Underfire (Album)
- Sounds From The Matrix 006 (CD, promotion sampler), Ungethuem (Edit)
- Synthphony REMIXed! 3 (CD, sampler), Bastard (African Frontline Mix by Implant)
- The Dark Entries…Into The Matrix (CD, promotion sampler), Die Sechste Armee (Club is a battlefield cut)

== Special collaborations ==
- The Retrosic - Nightcrawler (Collector's edition) (2xcd, DVD), Bastard (The Retrosic Version with vocals by Cyrus) and Bastard (Retrosic Remix)
