= Rotten to the Core =

Rotten to the Core may refer to:

- An English idiom, similar to the term bad apple
- Rotten to the Core (film), 1965 film starring Thorley Walters
- Rotten to the Core (album), 2007 album by X-Fusion
- "Rotten to the Core" (song), 2015 Disney song from the film Descendants
