= Headscan =

Canadian music duo

- Origin: Montreal, Quebec, Canada
- Genres: Post-industrial; EBM; Electronica; Industrial; Electro-industrial; Alternative dance
- Years active: 1986–present
- Labels: Artoffact Records
- Members: Claude Charnier; Christian Pomerleau

Headscan is a Canadian music duo, composed of electronic musician Claude Charnier and singer Christian Pomerleau, based in Montreal, Quebec. The pair combines dark trance and industrial dancefloor-oriented electronic and acoustic music.

== History ==
Charnier and Pomerleau have been active in Montreal's local alternative music scene, particularly within the techno industrial outfit Insurgent. Their first album, Shaper and Mechanist, was released in 2001, and was a theme album based on work of novelist Bruce Sterling.

In 2005, they released two singles, as well as an album, Pattern Recognition. Reviews were mixed. Their music was released on Artoffact Records and licensed in Europe to Alfa Matrix. In 2008, the band played at the Kinetik Festival, and their single "Lolife" was included on a compilation CD, KINETIK FESTIVAL VOLUME 2.

== Discography ==
=== Albums ===
- Shaper and Mechanist (2001)
- Uturn 2: An Exploration in Techno (2002, split album with Implant)
- Pattern Recognition (2005)

=== EPs ===
- High-Orbit Pioneers (2000) Limited CD release, approximately 100 copies
- Dead Silver Sky (2004)

=== Singles ===
- Lolife 1 (2005)
- Lolife 2 (2005)
