= Dolls of Pain =

Dark electro band of France

Dolls of Pain is a dark electro band from France founded in 2003. It performs primarily in English.

== Biography ==
The band was founded in 2003 by Olivier (songwriter) and Cédric (keyboards). (The band identifies its members only by their first name.) Several months later, Laurent (vocals) and Stéphane (guitar) joined the band. In July 2009 Stéphane left the band, and Nicolas (keyboards in live performance) joined. Olivier continued to play keyboards in the studio, but switched to the guitar on stage.

In early 2005, the band released its first album on Urgence Disk, a Swiss record label.

Dolls of Pain has performed throughout Europe since 2003 (France, Germany, England, Switzerland, Belgium, Luxembourg, the Netherlands).

The band released three albums on Urgence Disk and three remix compilations produced by Auto-Restriction Production (ARP) and released as free downloads. Subsequently, then signed with the Hungarian record label Advoxya Records.

The band has released remixes of other dark electro groups such as Miss Construction, HausHetaere and Bak XIII.

The band has performed at music festivals including Gothic Family Festival (Germany), Dungeon Open Air Festival (Germany) and Gothic Festival (Belgium), and on 30 May 2009 at Wave-Gotik-Treffen (WGT) in Leipzig. It is scheduled to perform at the Energy Open Air festival in Cherkasy, Ukraine on 14 July 2012.

== Discography ==
=== Albums ===
- Emprise (CDR), Auto-Restriction Production, 2003
- Dominer (CD, mini album), Auto-Restriction Production, 2004
- Dec[a]dance (2 versions), Urgence Disk Records, 2006
- Dominer Remixes (MP3), Mekkanikal Industries, 2006
- Slavehunter (CD, album), Urgence Disk Records, 2007
- Mixxxhunter (MP3, album), Auto-Restriction Production, 2008
- Cybermanipulations (MP3, album), Auto-Restriction Production, 2009
- Cybersex (CD, album), Auto-Restriction Production, Urgence Disk Records, 2009
- Strange Kiss (CD, EP), Advoxya Records, 2010
- The Last Conflict (CD, album), Advoxya Records, 2011
- Déréliction (2xCD, Album, Ltd), Advoxya Records, 2013

=== Compilations ===
- Inside : Nihilista (CD, compilation) Hydra, Nihilista, 2007
- Precious Tears (Down In Hell Mix By Cold Drive) : Ultra Dark Radio - Compilation Volume III (MP3, compilation), Ultra Dark Radio, 2008
- Cybersex (Leaether Strip Remix) : Extreme Lustlieder 3 (CD, album, compilation), UpScene, Indigo, 2009
- Addiction (Endzeit Version) : Endzeit Bunkertracks [Act V] (4xCD, compilation), Alfa Matrix, 2010
- Lobotomy (Exit Version) : Electronic Aid To Haiti (MP3, compilation), Sigsaly Transmissions, 2010

=== Remixes ===
- Short Circuit (DOPMix) : Transfer_ERROR - Short Circuit (Remixes) (MP3), Mekkanikal Industries, 2005
- Philippe F (Hot Ketchup Remix) : Philippe F featuring Gibet - Philippe F Remixes (MP3), Walnut + Locust, 2006
- Cold Massive Blue (Dolls Of Pain Remix) : Wynardtage - Praise The Fallen – The Remixes/Silver Edition, Rupal Records, 2007
- New-Wave : Hynnner Vs Hant1s3 - EgoVox (CD, Album), Urgence Disk Records, 2008
- Space Baby (Dolls Of Pain RMX) : Playmate On The Run - Playmates On Speed (2xCD, Comp), Artek Lab, 2008
- Popsong For The Alienated (DOPmixXx) : Blackula - Remixes By The Alienating (MP3), Abyssa, 2008
- Electro Beast (Remixed By Dolls Of Pain) : Miss Construction - Kunstprodukt (CD, Album), Fear Section, 2008
- Open The Borders (Dolls Of Pain Remix) : Bak XIII - We Are Alive (CD, Single), Urgence Disk Records, 2009
- Crawling In The Dark (Dolls Of Pain Remix) : Freakangel - The Faults Of Humanity (CD, Album + CD, Album, Ltd), Alfa Matrix, 2010
- Sky (Dolls Of Pain Version) : HausHetaere - Syndicate + Syndicus (2xCD, Album, Ltd), Alfa Matrix, 2010
- The Next Chapter (Dolls Of Pain Re_mixxx) : Alien Produkt - The Next Chapter (CD, EP), Advoxya, 2010
