= Unter Null =

American singer

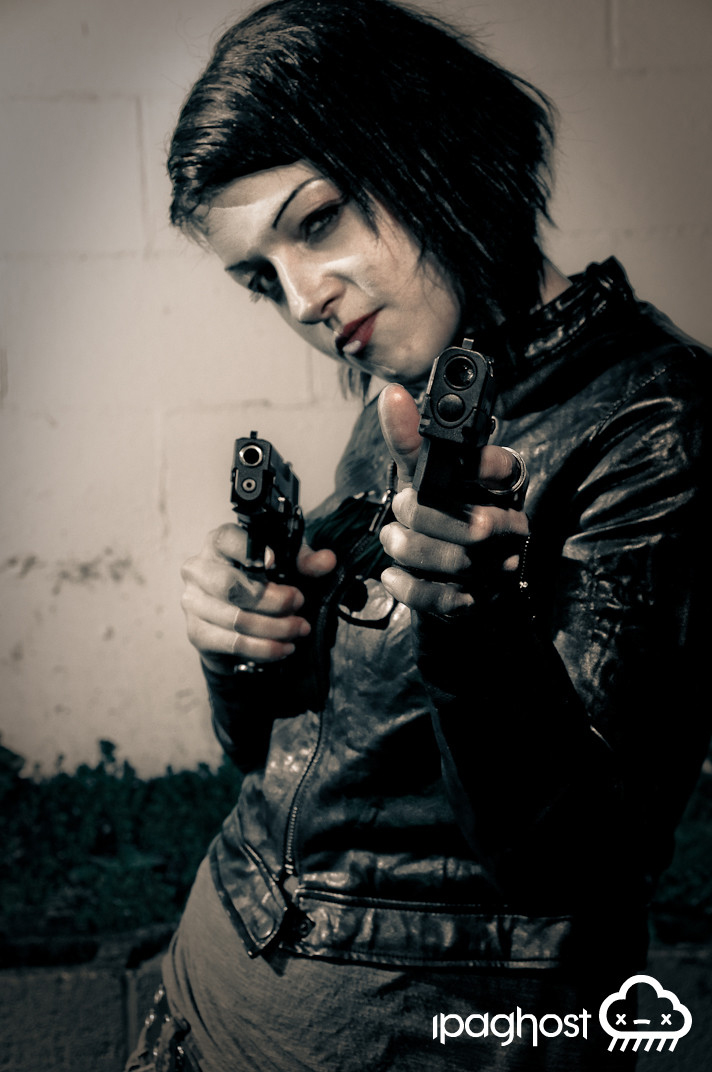

Background information
- Origin: Seattle, WA, United States
- Genres: Aggrotech; Trance music Power noise EBM; Industrial
- Instruments: Piano, Cello, Guitar
- Years active: 1998–present
- Label: Alfa Matrix
- Spinoffs: Stray
- Members: Erica Dunham

Unter Null (from German; Eng.: "Below Zero") is an American dark electro-industrial music act, founded in 1998 as a solo aggrotech project by Erica Dunham, when Dunham was age 17 and living in Seattle in the Northwestern United States. Dunham is trained in classical piano, cello and guitar. Live performances consist of Dunham on lead vocals. As of 2025, Unter Null is based in Los Angeles.

== History ==
Unter Null (German for 'below zero') initially began as a powernoise project influenced by a number of similar prominent artists, including Noisex, Converter and P.A.L. Her first, self-titled, album was released in 2001. In 2002, she was signed to Leech and NTT/Annihilvs Records to release her second, web-exclusive album Neocide. In 2005, she signed to label Alfa Matrix. She has since released a number of EPs and albums, remixed several artists, and appeared on compilation albums. Her album The Failure Epiphany peaked at #4 on the German Alternative Charts (DAC) and ranked #43 on the DAC Top Albums of 2006. The same year, the Sacrament EP reached #6 on the DAC Singles chart.

== Music ==
In early 2008, Dunham launched her side project Stray with the release of the self-titled a 2-CD album in cooperation with a number other bands including Mothboy, Detritus and Testube. In addition to regular live performances, Unter Null embarked on a short U.S. and European tour in 2005, then a longer European tour in 2006.

=== House fire ===
On December 25, 2008, Dunham's studio, containing her musical, recording and electronic equipment as well as other belongings, was destroyed in a fire. It was feared at first that her newest album, Moving On, had been lost in the fire, although tracks were able to be recovered from a damaged hard drive.

== Discography ==
Albums
Date of release	Title	Label
2001	Unter Null	
2002	Neocide	Annihilvs
2005	The Failure Epiphany	Alfa Matrix
2010	Moving On	Alfa Matrix
2010	Moved On	Alfa Matrix
2026	The Rise From Ruin (and the Ritual of Becoming)	Alfa Matrix
EPs
Date of release	Title	Label
2005	Sick Fuck EP	Alfa Matrix
2006	Absolution EP/Sacrament EP Note: Released together as a compilation.	Alfa Matrix
2025	Coming Up To Breathe	Alfa Matrix
2025	You Made A Monster	Alfa Matrix

=== Compilation albums ===
- The Information Apocalypse Compilation (2002, Annilvs), 1000 limited edition copies – Tender Mercies
- Re:connected [1.0] (2004, Alfa Matrix)
- Synthphony REMIXed! Vol. 3 (2005, Synthphony Records) – Your Nightmare (Da Deep Cut Mix)
- Endzeit Bunkertracks: Act I (2005, Alfa Matrix)
- Sounds From The Matrix 02 (2005), - Sick Fuck
- Endzeit Bunkertracks: Act II (2006, Alfa Matrix) – Sick Fuck (Aesthetic Perfection Mix)
- Re:connected [2.0] (2006, Alfa Matrix)
- Sounds From The Matrix 03 (2006), - Martyr
- Endzeit Bunkertracks: Act III (2007, Alfa Matrix) – Journey to Descent
- Sounds From The Matrix 04 (2007), - This Is Your End
- Songs in the Key of Death (2008, Sonic Mainline) – DEATHKEY
- Industrial Attack Vol.1 (2008), – Zombie Boy
- Rape This Industrial World Vol.1 (2008), – Sick Fuck (Album Mix)
- Synthetic Reign Volume One (2008), - Feed The Lie
- Sounds From The Matrix 07 (2008), - Moving On (Essence Of Mind Mix)
- Endzeit Bunkertracks: Act IV (2009), - Broken Heart Cliché
- Extreme Sündenfall 9 (2009), - The Fall (Wynardtage Remix)
- Kinetik Festival Volume Two (2009), - Prophecy (Blank Mix)
- Sounds from the Matrix 08 (2009), - Your Fall
- Sounds from the Matrix 09 (2009), - Visceral Venom
- Sounds from the Matrix 10 (2009), - I Can't Be The One (EX.ES Mix)
