= Heimatærde =

German electro-industrial band

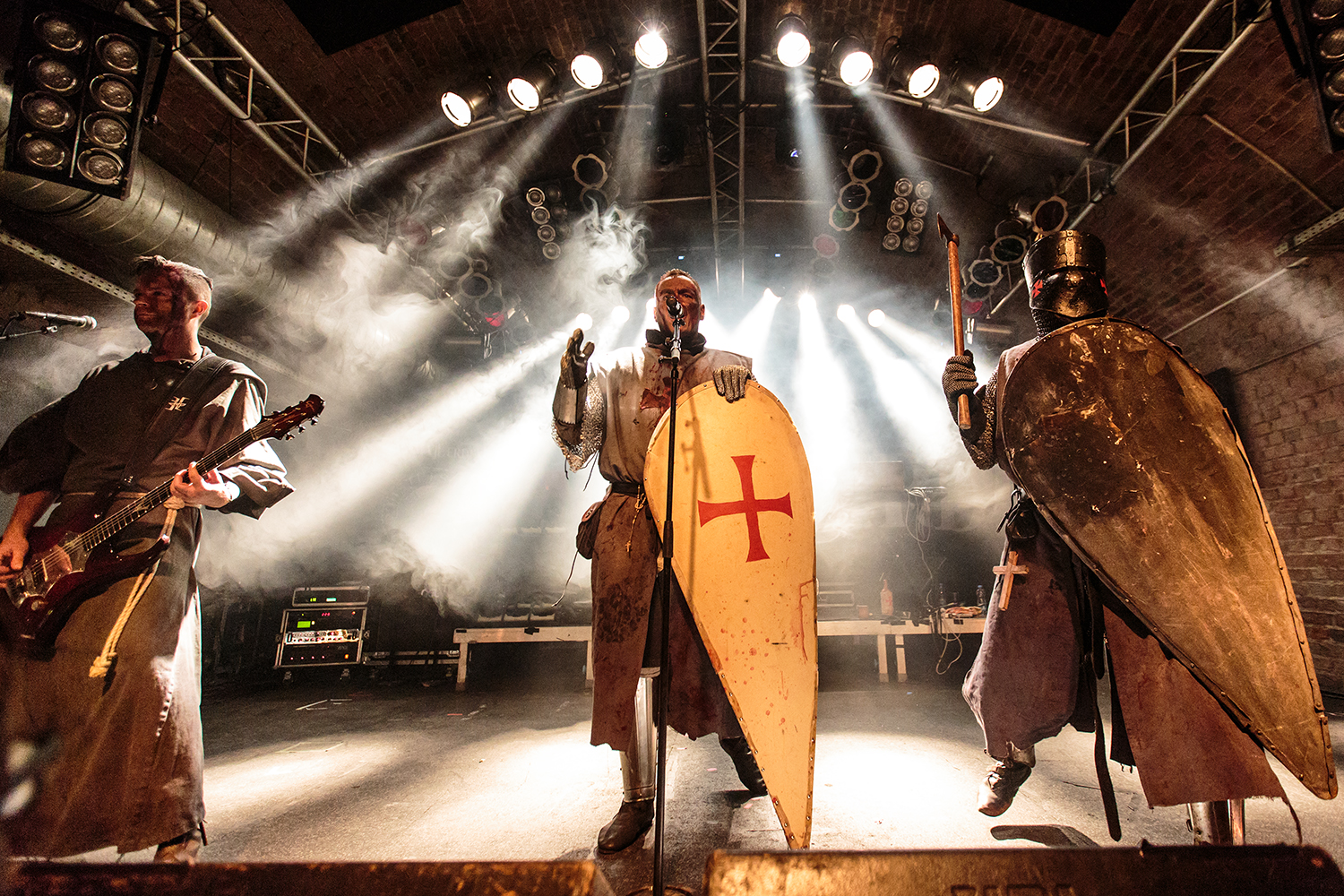
- Heimatærde in 2016

Background information
- Origin: Germany
- Genres: Industrial metal, aggrotech, folktronica, neo-medieval music
- Years active: 2004–present
- Labels: Metropolis Records (international); Infacted Records 2005–2010; Golden Core 2011–2013; Out of Line 2014–2016; Fully Packed Records 2016–present
- Members: Ashlar von Megalon; Andreas Aus Nienbrugge; Ansgar Von Hucretha; Jacques De Périgord
- Website: https://heimataerde.de

Heimatærde is a German electro-industrial band with a medieval motif. It was created as a studio project by Disc jockey Ashlar von Megalon (DJ Ash) in 2004.

== History ==
Heimatærde was founded in 2004, as a studio project by German DJ Ashlar von Megalon. After the first EP Ich hab die Nacht getræumet (tr. I Have Dreamed the Night), released in the same year by Infacted Recordings, the first album 'Gotteskrieger' was released in 2005. Outside Germany it is released from Metropolis Records. In the beginning, DJ Ash avoided acting on stage, because music should be in the fore. The first performance of Heimatærde was 2007 at Wave-Gotik-Treffen in Leipzig. In January 2018, the new drummer, Brother Henry of Kent, was introduced. He has supported the band live before.

== Discography ==
=== Albums ===
- Gotteskrieger (2005)
- Kadavergehorsam (2006)
- Unwesen (2007)
- Gottgleich (2012)
- Kaltwærts (2014)
- Ærdenbrand (2016)
- Eigengrab (2020)

=== Singles ===
- Ich Hab Die Nacht Geträumet (2004)
- Unter der Linden (2006)
- Vater (2008)
- Dark Dance (2009)
- Malitia Angelica (2010)
- Bruderschaft (2014)
- Hick Hack Hackebeil (2016)
- Tanz (2020)
- Bei Meiner Ehr' (2020)

== Gallery ==
Heimatærde, Line-up live at Nocturnal Culture Night 2018 in Deutzen

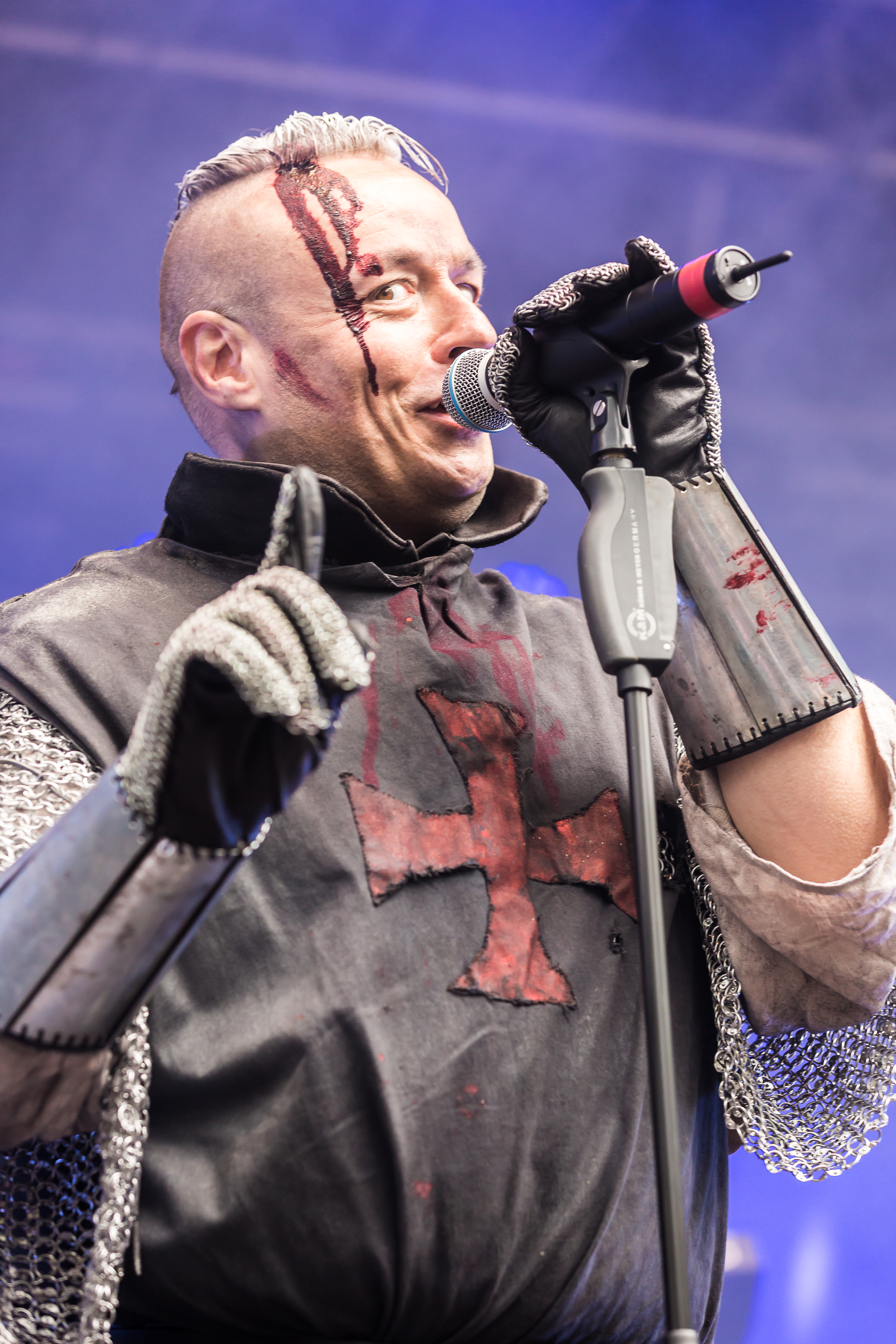
Singer Ashlar von Megalon

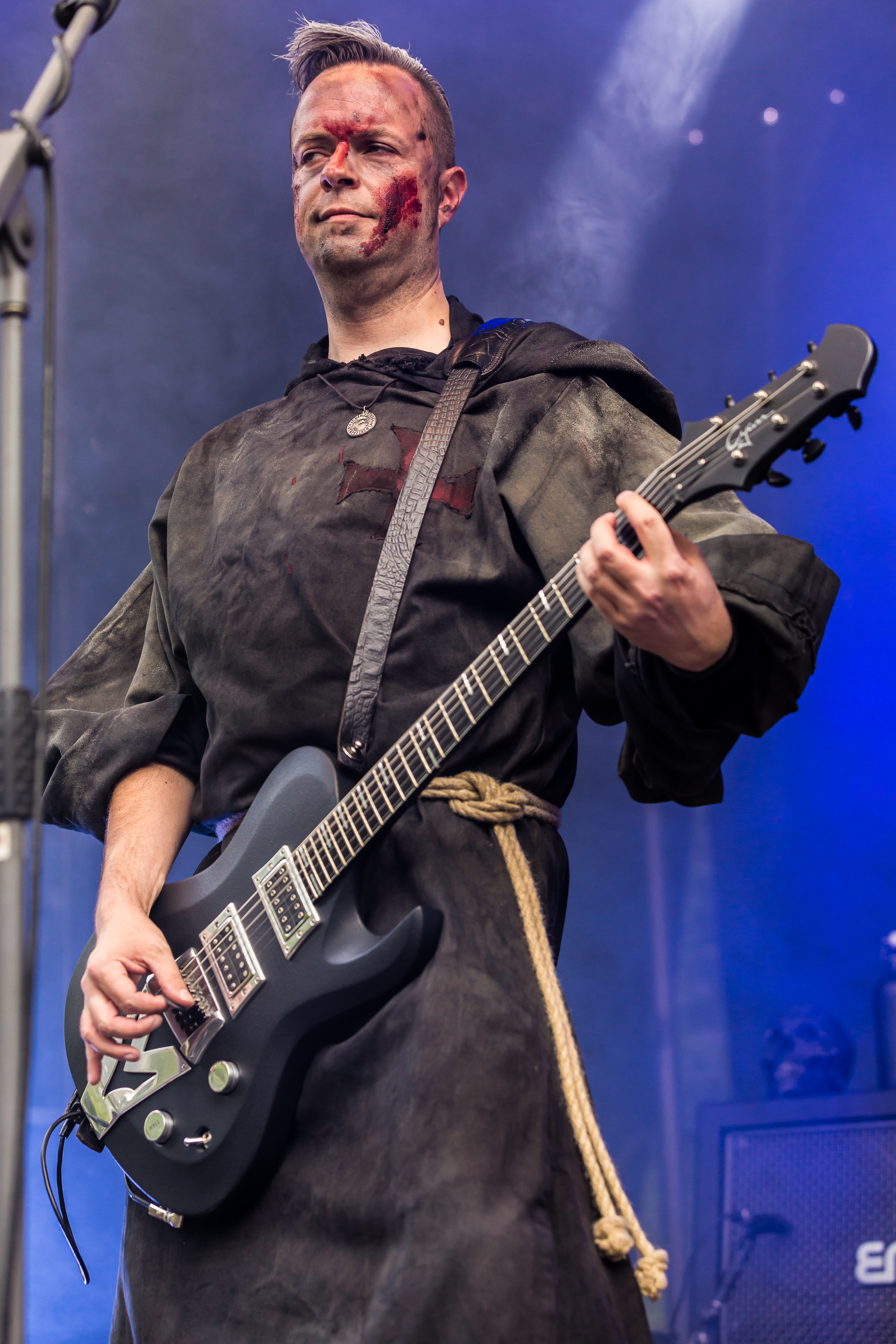
Guitarist Brother Jacques de Pèrigord

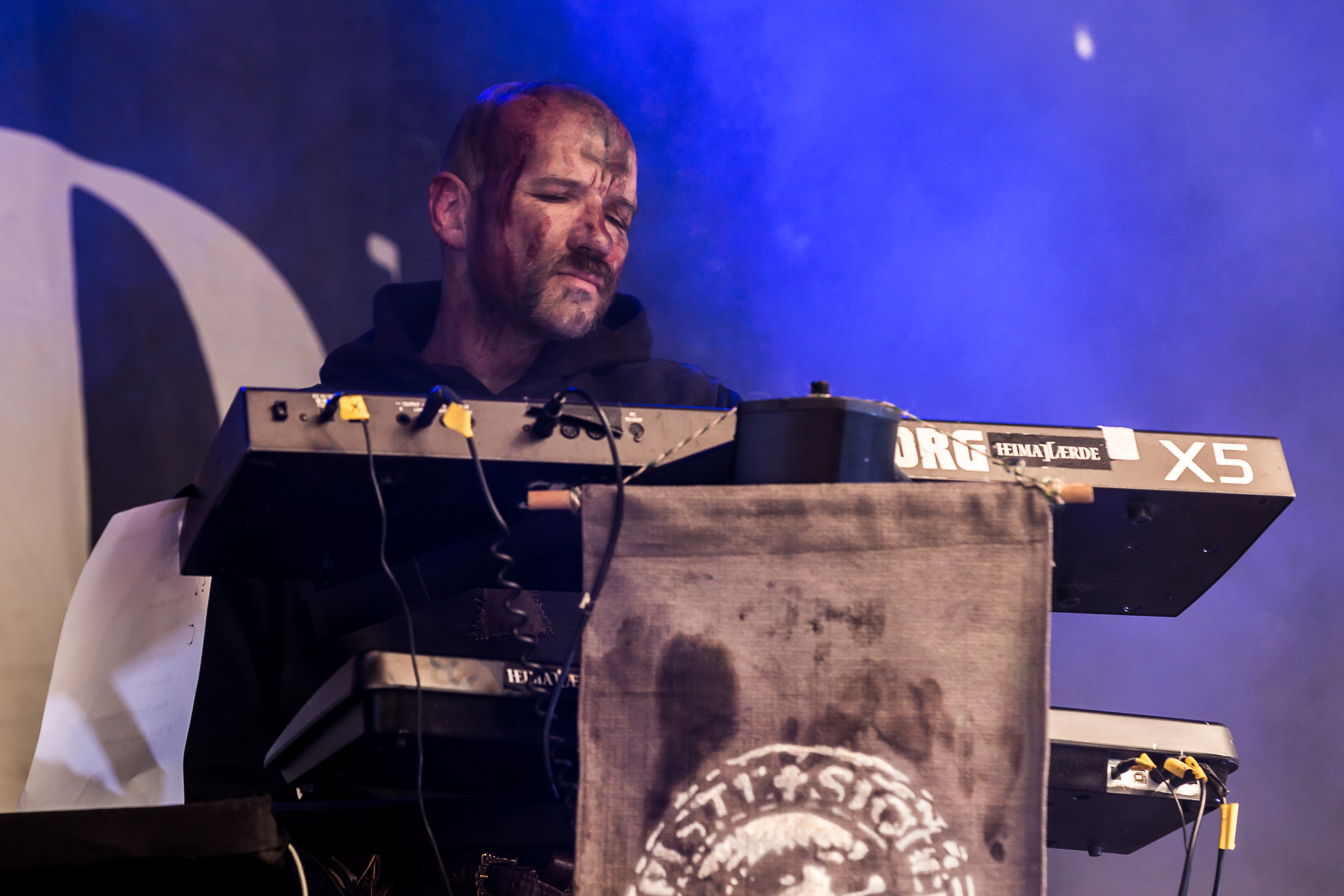
Keyboarder Brother In Hoc Signo

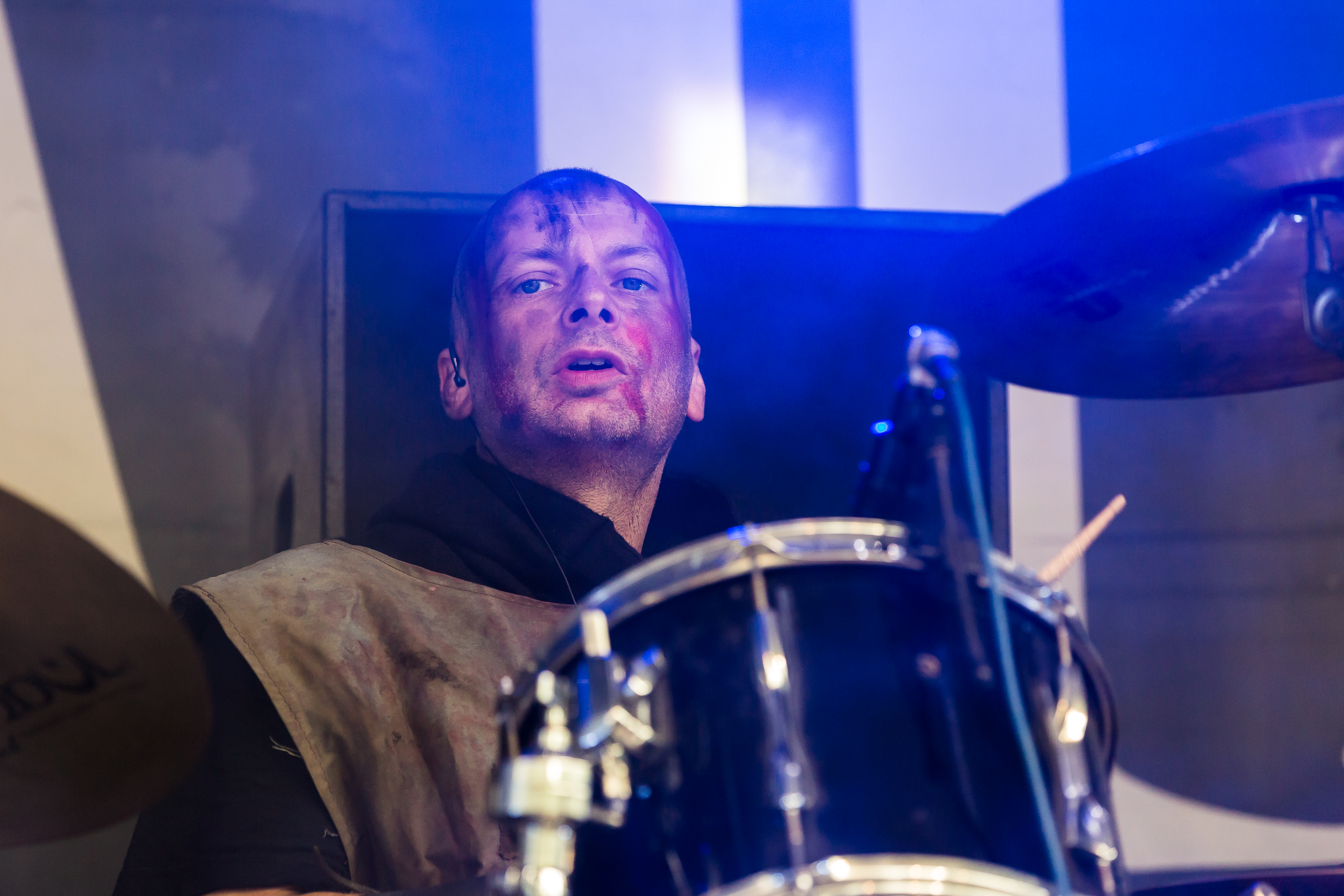
Drummer Brother Henry von Kent

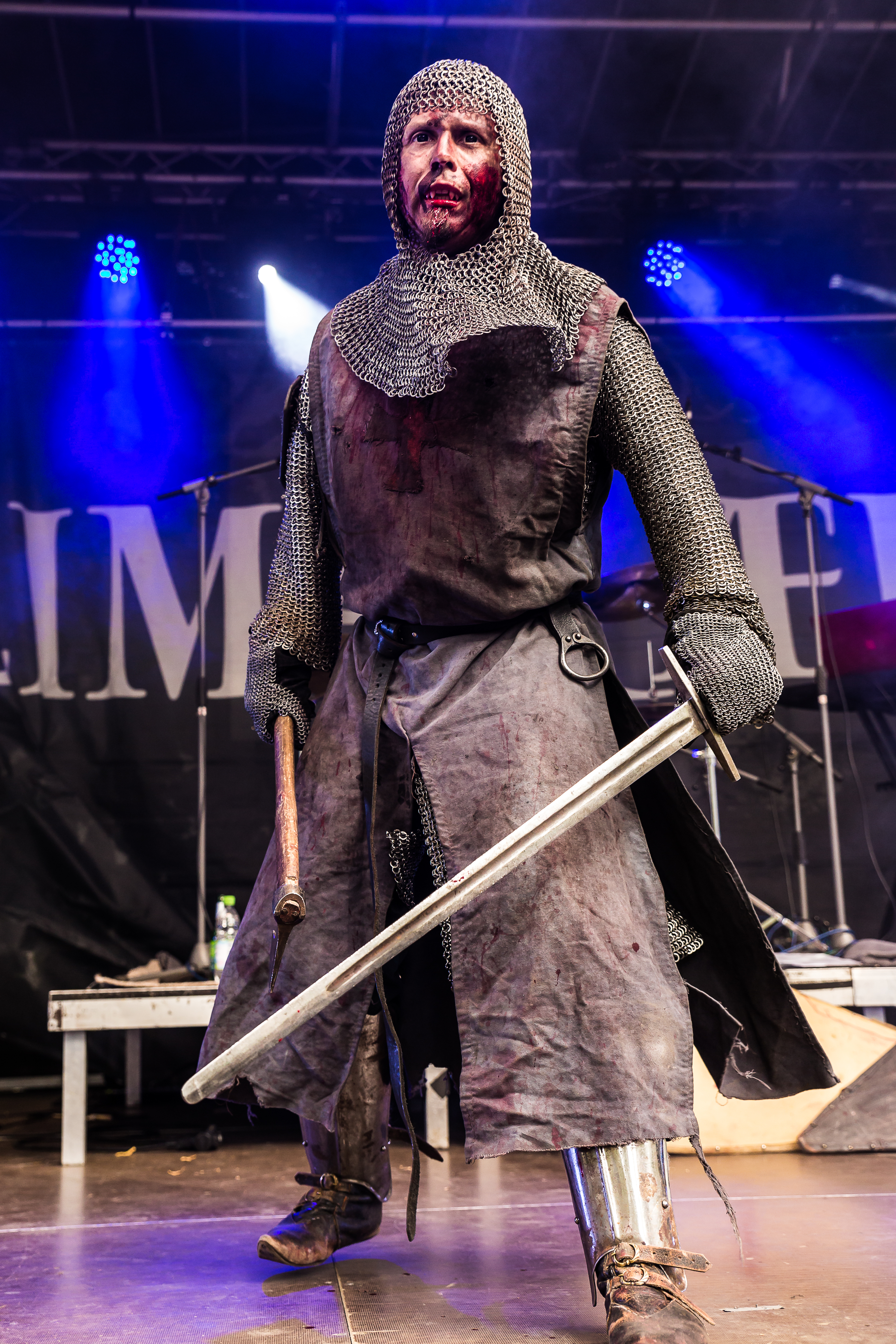
Brother in Armour Ignatius von Schneeberg
