= Virtual Embrace =

German electronic music group

- Origin: Berlin, Germany
- Genres: Aggrotech, electronic, electro-industrial, power noise
- Years active: 2004–present
- Labels: Alfa Matrix, NoiTekk, MAO-Music
- Members: Mike Johnson; DJ CyberChrist

Virtual Embrace is an aggrotech band from Berlin, Germany formed by Mike Johnson (a current member of Agonoize, Sero.Overdose, and Infekktion) and DJ CyberChrist. Their first release was Roots of Evil EP in 2004 and became successful. Influenced by the likes of Hocico, and Suicide Commando, but Mike Johnson denied it, Virtual Embrace is the flagship band for the Hellektro label MAO-Music and, as of 2005, is similar in style to bands on the label NoiTekk, such as Grendel, Psyclon Nine, Aslan Faction, and Tactical Sekt.

== Discography ==
=== Studio albums ===
- Escape To Insane (Alfa Matrix, 2004)
- Hellektro (Alfa Matrix, 2005)

=== EPs ===
- Roots of Evil (Alfa Matrix, 2004)
- Hollow And Pure (Alfa Matrix, 2005)

=== Remixes ===
- Disappear! at Disappear! (CDr, EP, Ltd) (Alfa Matrix, 2004)
- Nahtot at Nahtot (CDr) (Alfa Matrix, 2004)
- Not Unique at Psychosomatically Unique (CDr, Ltd, EP) (Alfa Matrix, 2004)
- Forever at Re:Connected [1.0] (2xCD, Ltd) (Alfa Matrix, 2004)
- Das Licht at RE_Productions (Das Licht + Wet Dream) (CD, EP, Ltd) (Black Flames Records, 2004)
- Border at Border (File, MP3) (dependent, 2005)
- Harm at Edge Of Incision (CD, EP) (Infacted Recordings, 2005)
- Stray at The Failure Epiphany (2xCD + Box) (Alfa Matrix, 2005)
- Stray at The Failure Epiphany / Sick Fuck (3xCD, Album + Box, Ltd) (Alfa Matrix, 2005)
- Existence at United Vol 1 (CD) (NoiTekk, 2005)
- Conspiracy With The Devil at Bind, Torture, Kill (CD, Album + CD, Maxi + Box, Ltd) (Terror Productions, Dependent Records, 2006)
- Border at Border (File, AAC) (Metropolis Records, 2006)
- GBA (VE Mix) at For Emergency Use Only (CD, Mini, Ltd) (Not On Label, 2007)
