= À;GRUMH... =

Belgian EBM/industrial band

à;GRUMH...
- Origin: Charleroi, Belgium
- Genres: Industrial; EBM
- Years active: 1981–1991
- Labels: Titicaca; Scarface; Play It Again Sam; Ironflame; Infacted
- Spinoffs: nEGAPADRES.3.3; POLAR PRAXIS; THEEE REBEARTH CORPORATION
- Members: Phillippe Genion (SΔ3 Evets); Jacques Meurrens (JΔ3 Seuqcaj); Stéphane Magnien (JΔ55 Ekoj)
- Past members: Pascal (PΔ3 Lacsap); Jean-Marc (JΔ7 Cram-Naej)
- Website: www.agrumh.com Official Website

à;GRUMH... (French pronunciation: [aɡʁym]) was a Belgian EBM/industrial band, founded in 1981 by SΔ3 Evets (also known as Steve Natrix, born Phillippe Genion) and JΔ3 Seuqcaj (Jacques Meurrens), both from Charleroi, Belgium. They were mainly active between 1981 and 1991.

== Band name ==
According to the band's official website, the somewhat cryptic band name originates from the time when SΔ3 and former member PΔ3 (real first name Pascal) first met in an intercity train in 1981, both of them returning from a rock concert. Just this night, they were about to create their first piece based on vegetables' and fruits' names, calling it Poireau ('leek'). Since the leek is a vegetable, the band was named à;GRUMH..., which is in fact a stylized form of the French word agrume ("citrus fruit"). The English pronunciation, however, is normally "ah-groom", because the French "u" sound in agrume does not exist in English. The band were described by the Washington Post as "a Belgian synth duo with a flair for punctuation and a sense of humor".

== Band history ==
The band's first release, "By the Phone", was recorded over the telephone, and early releases were on cassette. They made their vinyl debut in 1985 with the mini-LP Mix Yourself, produced by Daniel B of Front 242, who, along with Throbbing Gristle and SPK, were identified by the band as influences. This was followed in 1986 by two full-length albums, Rebearth and No Way Out.

The band's first few releases alternated between industrial and "rhythmic" EBM styles, and they initially considered themselves to be two different bands using the same name. This differentiation was only indicated on the albums by the font styles used to print the band name on the records - gothic font for the industrial/ambient styled releases, and bold Helvetica to indicate the EBM styled releases. Eventually, their label at the time, Scarface, received complaints from record stores of their see-sawing release styles and urged them to be more consistent in their approach.

In 1986 at the end of their first large European Tour, they teamed up with Skinny Puppy's Kevin Crompton and Nivek Ogre for the side project A Chud Convention and produced the ambient/noise mini-LP Sorrow. on their own label Circle Records (distributed by Play it Again Sam).

In 1987, they released another full album Black Vinyl Under Cover (differently titled in its CD version Silver Circle Under Plàstic), and several 12" and mini LP's : Underground, Too Many Cooks Spoil the Broth (alternatively titled Too Many Cocks Spoil the Breath on 33% of the releases), and in 1988 Bloody Side. à;GRUMH... went on a second large European tour in 1987 with support acts such as Click Click and Severed Heads, and in 1988 in Europe and Canada. The records were then distributed worldwide (Wax Trax in the US, SPV, New Rose, etc.) and world press coverage followed (two pages in the Melody Maker including the sentence "possibly the band of the decade" and several one-full-page articles in the New Musical Express (plus single of the week for "Bloody Side"). In 1989 they released The Price is Right featuring the song "Ayatollah Jackson" that became a big alternative dance hit in Canada, plus Germanic and Scandinavian countries.

In 1989 they released what many consider as their most accomplished album A Hard Day's Knight (CD version titled "A Hard Knight's Day) including best-known songs "C.B.B." and "Danger Zone" that later were remixed and issued as And Now for Something Completely Different But Not Too Much. The tour that was going to follow that release was 5 months over Europe and 2 months in America. But just before the start of the "It's a Wonderful Wonderful World Tour 89/90", Meurrens (JΔ3) left the group in 1989, and was replaced by JΔ7 Cram-Naej (Jean-Marc) that was their stage percussionist since 1987. The tour was an enormous success, and every show was recorded with plans of releasing a live album.

But after the tour, Play it Again Sam said that they rather wanted another studio album than a live album. The band was exhausted by such a speedy and full 5-years and decided to take time off. Some gigs took place in Germany in 1991, but SΔ3 started to get involved in many new businesses and creations, publishing, and not being able to work together with the very irregular and uncontrollable JΔ7, he semi-retired from the music world.

The band was dormant from 1991, until 2000 when leader SΔ3 EVETS reunited with the original singer JΔ3 Seuqcaj. They reunited as an industrial combo, nEGAPADRES.3.3. (who had already released an album on Circle Records in 1988) and released a comeback album on Hermetique Records in 2006 called Extrophy of Amphigouris. Two new albums were scheduled for release in 2009, one La Phobie du Cheval made of all new tracks plus an à;GRUMH... cover, and another called Binche featuring Peter Gabriel's and The Vibrators guitar player John Ellis on three tracks.

SΔ3 EVETS is also known for his solo career as POLAR PRAXIS (two albums on Scarface/PIAS and Circle Records, recently re-issued on Onderstroom records) and the side project THEEE REBEARTH CORPORATION with other T-Circle Members.

In December 2016, à;GRUMH... performed as headline of the BIMFEST festival in Sint-Niklaas. J3 and S3 came to the stage for a full concert for the first time since 1989 (back in 2014 they had done a "performance" for the Hotel Charleroi art festival at the Coliseum theater in Charleroi but that was just a short happening, not a real concert).

For this 2016 concert, S3 had invited Joke Magnussen to join the band on stage, and J55 eKOJ was born. Following this concert and having had much fun in the rehearsals, J3 and J55 have started making music together and their new project is called hà;PEOPLE.3.55.

== Discography ==
Year	Title	Format	Label
1982	"By the Phone"	7"	Titicaca
1985	Mix Yourself!	12"	Scarface
1986	No Way Out	LP	Scarface
1986	Rebearth	LP	Scarface
1986	Underground	12"	Play It Again Sam
1987	Black Vinyl Under Cover	LP	Play It Again Sam
1987	Mix Yourself + No Way Out	CD	Play It Again Sam
1987	Silver Circle Under Plastic	CD	Play It Again Sam
1987	Too Many Cocks Spoil the Breath	12"	Play It Again Sam
1987	Too Many Cooks Spoil the Broth (= Censored Version)	12"	
1988	Bloody Side	12"/CD	Play It Again Sam
1988	We are à;GRUMH... and you are not!	12"/CD/cassette	Play It Again Sam
1989	A Hard Day's Knight	LP/CD	Play It Again Sam
1989	And Now For Something Completely Different... But Not Too Much!	12"	Play It Again Sam
1989	And Now For Something More Completely Different... But Not Too Much!	CD	
1989	The Price is Light	CD	
1989	The Price is Right	12"	
2004	Unclean	7"	Ironflame
2011	We Were a;GRUMH... And You Were Not	CD	Infacted

They have also appeared on various EBM music compilation albums, including This Is Electronic Body Music (1988), EBM Club Classics Vol. 2 (1999) and Endzeit Bunkertracks [Act I] (2005).
