= Detroit Diesel (band) =

Canadian musical duo

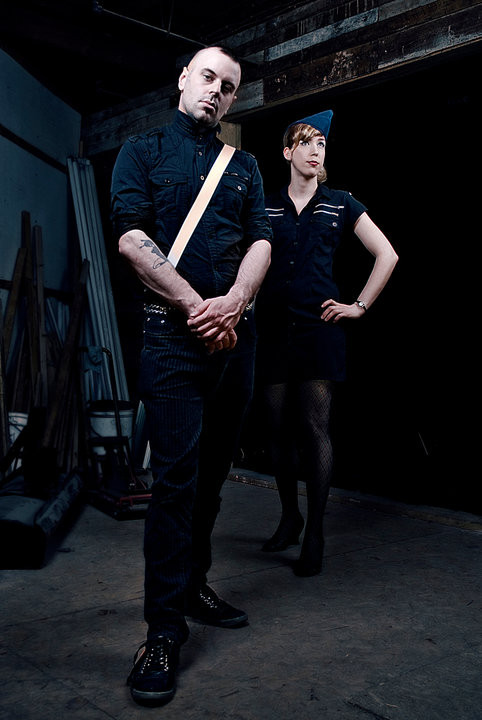

Background information
- Genre: Electronic body music
- Years active: 2006-2017, 2026 - present
- Labels: Deathwatch Asia, Infacted Recordings, Vendetta Music
- Members: Deadbilly; Greta Grey
- Past members: Vile; Clutch

Detroit Diesel is a French Canadian harsh EBM duo, founded in 2006, signed on Deathwatch Asia and Infacted-Recordings.

== History ==
Detroit Diesel released their first demo, Dancing with Terror, in 2008, with the song "When Darkness Falls" appearing on the Endzeit Bunkertracks IV compilation. Shortly after, Detroit Diesel underwent an internal restructuring.

In 2009, Detroit Diesel recorded the Terre Humaine demo, featuring ten songs, including the self-titled song "Terre Humaine" that would later appear on the 2010 Kinetik Festival compilation.

Detroit Diesel signed to Deathwatch Asia who decided to release the album Terre Humaine, consolidated from the previous demo, in 2010. The Lost Signals EP was released by Deathwatch Asia and Infacted Recordings in digital format.

The full-length debut album Terre Humaine was released on November 12, 2010, and was manufactured by Infacted Recordings for the European market, with Deathwatch Asia serving the rest of the world. Terre Humaine was reviewed favourably by the Side-Line webzine as "dark electro style" with "technoid tunes". The German Sonic Seducer review was also favourable, calling it a "notable debut". A staff reviewer of SputnikMusic also gave a positive review of the album.

A second full-length album Coup d'Etat was published on May 29, 2012. Manufactured by Infacted Recordings (EU), Vendetta Music (US) and with Deathwatch Asia serving the rest of the world. This was followed by their first European tour.

== Discography ==
=== Albums ===
Coup d'Etat (CD) Infacted Recordings (EU) / Deathwatch Asia 2012
No.	Title	Length
1.	"Crash And Burn"
2.	"Let's Pretend"
3.	"Just Like Falling"
4.	"Dance of the Dead (featuring Scott from iVardensphere)"
5.	"Black Flag"
6.	"Never Looking Back"
7.	"Speak No Evil"
8.	"Isolation"
9.	"Under Fire"
10.	"The Playground (featuring Dräcos from FGFC820)"
11.	"War Never Changes"
12.	"Let's Pretend (Preemptive Strike 0.1 remix)"
13.	"Speak No Evil (Extinction Front remix)"
14.	"War Never Changes (Nano Infect remix)"

Terre Inhumaine (remix album) (CD, Digital Download) DeathWatch Asia / Industry8 (America) 2011
No.	Title	Length
1.	"End Of Days"
2.	"Normandy (D-Day Mix)"
3.	"Serenade (More Evil Mix)"
4.	"Lost Signal (Freakangel Remix)"
5.	"Field Of The Dead (Blakopz Remix)"
6.	"Not Yet (Viagra Remix)"
7.	"All Lost Before Dawn (Tribal Mix By FGFC820)"
8.	"Terre Humaine (Inhumane Remix By SIN DNA)"
9.	"Bring Me Noise (Aalsmer Remix By Seb Komor)"
10.	"The Game (Terrorkode Remix)"
11.	"Zwanziger (Unleaded DYMX Remix)"
12.	"Ruins (Distorted Memory Remix)"
13.	"Red Rebels (Lexincrypt Remix)"
14.	"Deadly Sins"
15.	"In The City"

Terre Humaine (CD, Digital Download) Infacted Recordings (EU) / DeathWatch Asia 2010
No.	Title	Length
1.	"Normandy"
2.	"Serenade"
3.	"Lost Signal"
4.	"Field Of The Dead"
5.	"Not Yet"
6.	"All Lost Before Dawn"
7.	"Terre Humine"
8.	"Bring Me Noise"
9.	"The Game"
10.	"Zwanziger"
11.	"Ruins"
12.	"Red Rebels"
13.	"Serenade (C-LEKKTOR Remix)"
14.	"All Lost Before Dawn (FGFC820 Remix)"
15.	"Lost Signal (SOMAN Remix)"
16.	"All Lost Before Dawn (DIE SEKTOR Remix)"
17.	"All Lost Before Dawn (Katastroslavia Remix) If Bought Via iTunes Track #16 Is #15 And Track #16 Is"

=== EPs ===
Lost Signals (Digital Download) Infacted Recordings(EU) / DeathWatch Asia 2010
No.	Title	Length
1.	"Lost Signal"
2.	"Lost Signal (Soman Remix)"
3.	"Lost Signal (Freakangel Remix)"
4.	"In The City"

=== Demo ===
- Dancing With Terror (CDr, EP) Not On Label 2008

== Compilations ==
"Let It Be My End" Direct World Action For Japan 2011
"Normandy (D-Day Mix)" World Wide Electronics Volume One 2011
"The Game" Zillo CD 04/2011 2011
"Serenade" Gothic Compilation Part L 2011
"Lost Signal (Freakangel Remix)" Advanced Electronics Vol. 8 2010
"Normandy (D-Day Mix)" Bleed by Example 2010,/br> "Lost Signal (Freakangel Remix)" Infacted Vol. 5 2010
"All Lost Before Dawn" Mecha[nized] 2010
"Terre Humaine " Kinetik Festival Vol. 3 2010
"When Darkness Falls " Endzeit Bunkertracks [Act - IV] 2009

=== Compilations Appearances ===
- Infactious Vol Four 2014
- DWA XxX (100 Remixes) 2013
- Schwarze Nacht Tanz 6 2012
- Aderlass Vol. 8 2012
- Nachtaktiv Magazin-CD 1 // 08 - 2012
- Zillo CD-04/2012
- Gothic Spirits (EBM Edition 4) 2012
- Electronic Saviors Volume 2: Recurrence - Metropolis Records 2012
- Schwarze Nacht Tanz 6 2012
- Deathwatch Asia - 2012 Festival Tour Europe 2012
- World Wide Electronics Vol. 1 - Out Of line 2011
- Direct World Action For Japan - Deathwatch Asia 2011
- Zillo CD 04/2011 (CD, Comp) Zillo 2011
- Gothic Compilation Part L - Batbeliever Releases 2011
- Advanced Electronics Vol. 8 - SPV GmbH 2010
- Rock Oracle Compilation #5- Rock Oracle Magazine 2010
- Gothic Compilation Part XLIX - Batbeliever Releases 2010
- Infacted Vol. 5 - Infacted Recordings 2010
- Kinetik Festival Vol. 3 - Artoffact 2010
- Endzeit Bunkertracks [Act - IV] - Alfa-Matrix 2009
