= Neikka RPM =

American electronic band

- Origin: United States
- Genres: futurepop, aggrotech, electro-industrial
- Years active: 2001-Present
- Labels: Alfa Matrix
- Members: Dominique; Richard

Neikka RPM is an electronic band from the United States, launched in 2001. Their work has been released under the Alfa Matrix label.

== Releases ==
In 2002 Neikka RPM’s first single, “I Am Your Girl” appeared on the Cyberlab 3 compilation alongside acts such as The Young Gods and Juno Reactor.

Neikka RPM maintained a steady stream of remixes and compilation appearances (more than 20 releases) over the next few years but it was in 2004 when their single, “Here’s Your Revolution” brought the band international notoriety. The “Here’s Your Revolution” EP entered the Top 10 German Alternative Singles Charts in May 2004 and was named to the German Alternative Charts Top 100 Singles List (DAC, 2004).

“The Gemini Prophecies”, Neikka RPM's debut full-length, was released in 2004 by the Brussels based label Alfa-Matrix. The album revealed that the band was strongly influenced by many different genres, including electro-industrial, gothic, drum and bass and hard trance. Neikka RPM's unusual blend of genres and somewhat unorthodox musical arrangements termed the band's style as, Industrial N’ Beats by the editors of Side-Line Magazine.

After the debut album, Neikka RPM remained active with more than 30 remixes and compilations between 2004 and 2006. In the fall of 2006 Neikka RPM's second full-length album, “Rise of the 13th Serpent” was released by Alfa-Matrix. The album entered the top 10 German Alternative Album Charts in December 2006.

Both “The Gemini Prophecies” and “Rise of the 13th Serpent” featured guest performances by artists in the Industrial, EBM music genres. Guests have included, Leaether Strip, à;GRUMH..., Plastic Noise Experience, DJ Rexx Arkana, Kenji Siratori, Implant and Deranged Psyche from Nebula-H.

Articles, reviews, interviews have appeared in magazines such as, Side-Line, STUFF, Orkus, Sonic Seducer, Musicwerks and others. The music of Neikka RPM has been used in Indie films, TV programming and video.

== Discography ==
  - Battle Scars EP (2017)
  - Chain Letters (2010)
  - Deceive and Destroy Limited Edition Box Set (2010)
  - Rise of the 13th Serpent (2006)
  - Rise of the 13th Serpent Limited Edition Box Set (2006)
  - The Gemini Prophecies (2004)
  - The Gemini Prophecies Limited Edition Box Set (2004)
  - Here's Your Revolution EP (2004)
