= Agonoize =

German band

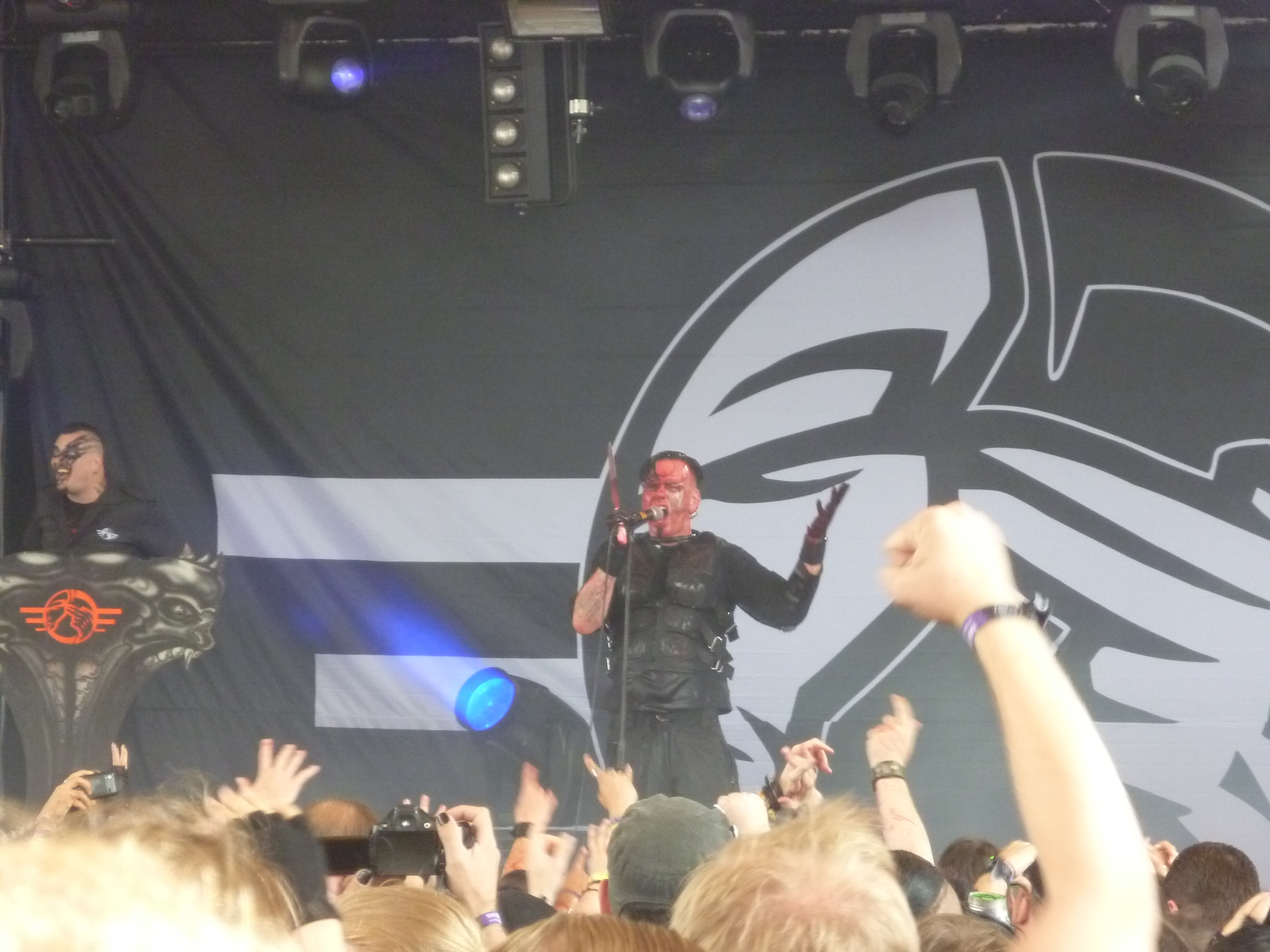
- Agonoize live at 2011 Amphi Festival

Background information
- Origin: Berlin, Germany
- Genres: Aggrotech
- Years active: 2002–present
- Labels: BLC Productions; Out of Line Music; Gravitator Records
- Members: Chris L. Mike Johnson; Oliver Senger

Agonoize is a German aggrotech band consisting of Mike Johnson (composition, programming, production and mastering), Oliver Senger (composition and programming) and Chris L (lyrics and vocals).

== History ==
Established in late 2002, their first concert was on April 11, 2004.

== Discography ==
- Paranoid Destruction EP (BLC Productions, 2003)
- Assimilation: Chapter One CD (BLC Productions, 2004)
- Open The Gate To Paradise EP (BLC Productions, 2004)
- 999 2CD (Out of Line Music, 2005)
- Evil Gets an Upgrade EP (Out of Line Music, 2005)
- Assimilation: Chapter Two (Out of Line Music, 2006) - reissue of 'Assimilation' with bonus CD
- Ultraviolent Six EP (Out of Line Music, 2006)
- Sieben 2CD (Out Of Line Music, 2007) (a 3CD edition was issued titled 'Sieben (Maximum Permissible Dose)
- For The Sick And Disturbed EP (Out of Line Music, 2008)
- Bis Das Blut Gefriert EP (Out of Line Music, 2009)
- Hexakosioihexekontahexa (Out of Line Music, 2009)
- Wahre Liebe (2012)
- Apokalypse EP (2014)
- Apokalypse (2014)
- Midget Vampire Porn (2019)
- Revelation Six Six Sick (2021)

== Remixing appearances ==
- 2003
  - Infekktion - Try To Believe
- 2004
  - Schattenschlag - Nekromantik
  - Beta - Darkness (Agonoize Remix)
  - Dunkelwerk - Die Sechste Armee
- 2005
  - Suicide Commando - Menschenfresser
  - Grendel - Soilbleed
- 2006
  - Distorted Reality - Never Change
  - Dioxyde - Invasive Therapy
- 2007
  - Suicide Commando - Hellraiser
- 2009
  - Oomph! - Labyrinth (Agonize Remix)
- 2010
  - Megaherz - Loblieder - Dein Herz Schlagt (Agonize Remix)
  - Ashbury Heights - Die By Numbers (Agonoize Remix)
