= Faderhead =

German record producer

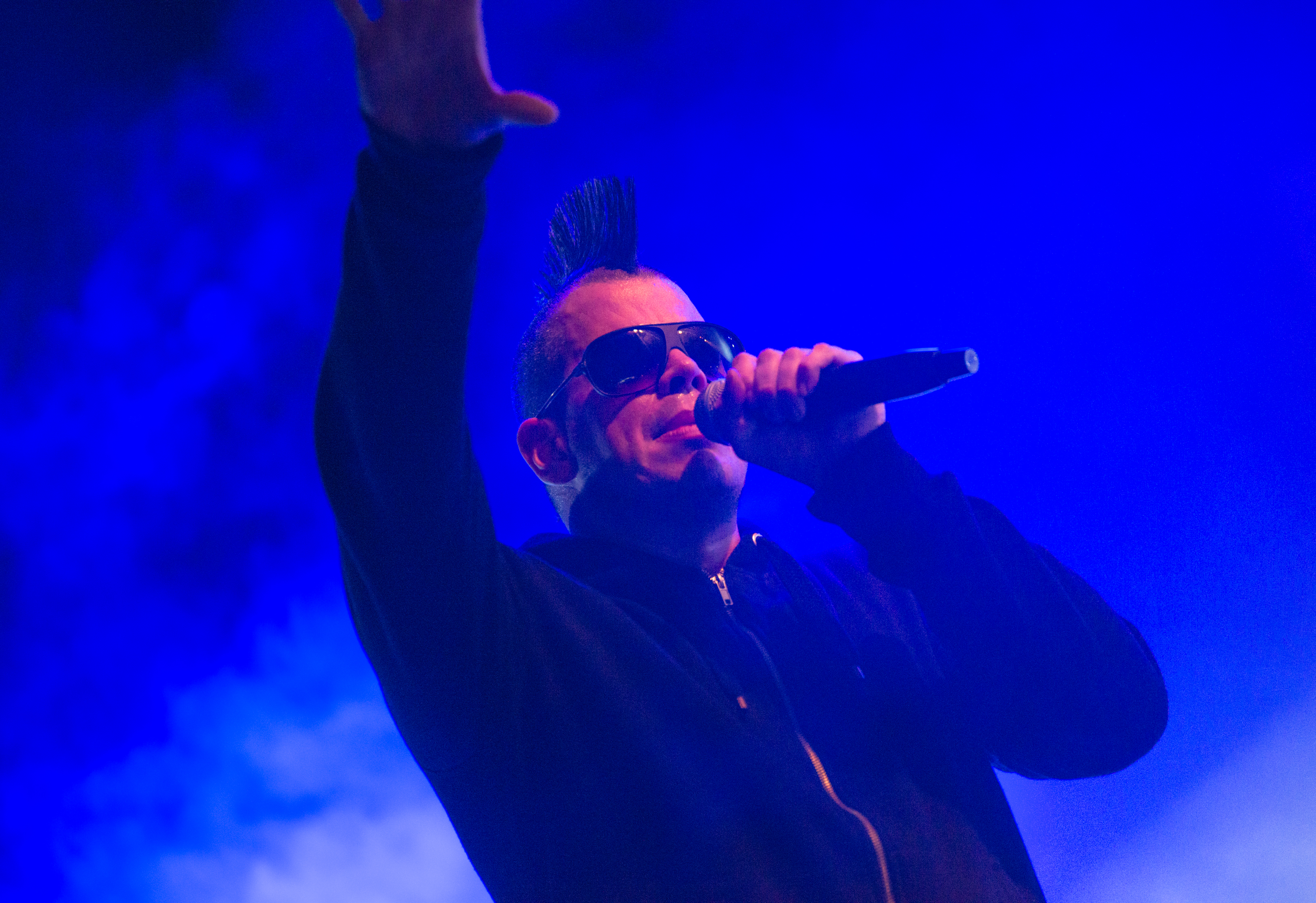

Background information
- Origin: Hamburg, Germany
- Genres: EBM; Industrial
- Years active: 2004—present
- Labels: Accession; L-Tracks; Not A Robot
- Members: Faderhead
- Website: www.faderhead.com

Sami Mark Yahya, professionally known by his stage name Faderhead or also under the pseudonym Sam Nordmann, is a German electronic music producer and vocalist from Hamburg, Germany.

== History ==
After releasing the track "The Protagonist" as a one-off compilation entry on the Advanced Electronics Vol. 3, Faderhead received a deal with Accession Records/Indigo to release his debut album FH1 in 2006. Positive reviews made FH1 an instant debut-success with standout tracks like "The Protagonist", "Vanish" and "O/H Scavenger". The year progressed and saw Faderhead play shows alongside bands like Diary Of Dreams, SITD, Painbastard and others.

2007 saw the release of the FH2 CD which featured the club hit "Dirtygrrrls/Dirtybois". Faderhead released a music video for the track "Girly Show" and played festivals like Wave-Gotik-Treffen (Germany) and Infest (UK) among other shows.

2008 started with the departure from Accession Records and the signing to L-Tracks Recordings. This decision led to serious speculation regarding the future of Faderhead by press and fans, but the free song/video release of the piano ballad "Exit Ghost" revealed that the project would continue. Only a few months later the club anthem "TZDV" was released, and on October 10, the FH3 album was released and again gathered top reviews.

In 2009, Faderhead played the M'era Luna Festival (Germany), the Exit Festival (Serbia) as well as shows in the Netherlands, Italy, Greece, Great Britain, Belgium and Mexico. In October 2009, Faderhead released the "Horizon Born" EP, which was well received.

2010 saw the release of Trilogy. Since FH1, FH2 and FH3 had been sold out and were not reprinted, Faderhead decided to compile the most popular 18 tracks from that release onto one CD.

In October 2010, the fourth full-length album, Black Friday, was released. The concept album tells the story of a night gone wrong. It was accompanied by a 15-minute short movie and quickly garnered reviews as Faderhead's most mature album. Faderhead played a European club tour as well as the Christmas Ball Festival tour with Laibach, Project Pitchfork, Fields Of The Nephilim and Agonoize.

2011 began with a 15-show tour in the US with Aesthetic Perfection and Everything Goes Cold and ended with a download-only EP release called “The Way To Fuck Clubs”, which showcased remixes of “The Way To Fuck God” as well as an acoustic version of “Hot Bath And A Cold Razor” and “The Moth And The Fire”. The biggest show of 2011 happened at Wave-Gotik-Treffen in Leipzig when the festival organizers had to close the venue to prevent overcrowding.

In 2012, the fifth album, The World of Faderhead, was released alongside three 360° panoramic images and 3 music videos. The video to “Fistful Of Fuck You” became popular, due to its original style and content. Faderhead headlined a 14-show US tour and played all over Europe including a set at the M'era Luna Festival hangar stage. The European pressing of “The World of Faderhead” was already almost sold out before the end of the year and Faderhead reached the no. 7 spot of MusicNonStop's best-selling releases of 2012 in the UK, tying And One and coming in ahead of legacy-acts like Fields Of The Nephilim, De/Vision, Suicide Commando and Hocico. Because "The World of Faderhead" sold out so quickly, Faderhead also released the double-CD-compilation "Two Sides To Every Story" which features Faderhead's most popular clubtracks on CD 1 and the most popular pop-songs/ballads on CD 2.

2013 saw Faderhead releasing the "FH4" album, which spawned the single and video to "Dancers", a collaboration with Techno MC Shawn Mierez ("I Like It Loud") and Shaolyn ("Face Down"). Worldwide touring (including 14 shows in the US) followed and Faderhead returned to the Amphi Festival in Köln, Germany.

In 2014 the “Atoms & Emptiness”-album was released in February. Faderhead went on a 4-week European co-headlining tour with Aesthetic Perfection and music videos to “Stand Up” and “When The Freaks Come Out” were released. After that Faderhead took a 1.5 year break from producing and performing.

2016 Faderhead released “FH-X” on February 12 and toured the UK and Germany. In October he also released the 10 song EP “Anima In Machina” which featured 8 reworked old songs and 2 new tracks. Then Faderhead supported Covenant on a 10-show-tour in Germany which sold-out venues in Hamburg, Hannover, Erfurt, Stuttgart, Krefeld and Frankfurt.

2017 opened with the release of the single “Know Your Darkness”.

The ninth studio album "Night Physics" (including the single "Know Your Darkness") was released in late 2017, followed by a 10-show-tour of Germany and a concert at the sold out Agra-Halle at Wave-Gotik-Treffen 2018. Faderhead then went on another tour of Germany with Project Pitchfork.

In 2019 Faderhead played the main stage at Amphi Festival in Cologne/Germany as well as NCN Festival in Deutzen briefly before the release of the tenth studio album "Asteria", which included the single "From His Broken Bones" The band played an album release show at Kulttempel in Oberhausen, Germany.

In spring of 2020 Faderhead played only one show of the "Asteria"-Germany tour (on March 7, 2020 in Mannheim) before the tour was cancelled due to the worldwide Coronavirus/COVID-19 pandemic. Faderhead released the single "I Did Not Know" with guest vocalist Sven Friedrich of Solar Fake and the Halloween-single "Halloween Spooky Queens". In December Faderhead released the "2077"-EP, which was music meant for playing the Cyberpunk 2077 game that was released shortly after. Faderhead also created an electronic remix for "Gesegnet & Verflucht" a song by German singer Nino DeAngelo.

In 2021 Faderhead released the single "Better" with guest vocalist Chris Harms (Lord Of The Lost). Despite the on-going pandemic, the "15 Years Of Faderhead"-anniversary show took place at Circus Probst in Gelsenkirchen/Germany.

In 2021 success also came as songwriter for other bands: the band Eisbrecher entered the official German album charts at #1 with their album "Liebe. Macht. Monster." for which Faderhead co-wrote the song "Nein Danke" and the band Lord Of The Lost entered the official German album charts at #2 with their album "Judas" for which Faderhead co-wrote the song "2000 Years A Pyre".

Faderhead also remixed "Halloween Spooky Queens" and released a 2021 version along with an official lyric video.

In December 2021 Faderhead released the full-length album "Years Of The Serpent" with the singles "All Black Everything" and "Too Dead For Life", both of which were released with music videos.

2022 at saw Faderhead return to the live stage at solo gigs and festivals like Unter Schwarzer Flagge 2022, M'era Luna 2022, E-Tropolis 2022 and Dark Storm 2022.

He also released the single "Dark Water" from the "Years Of The Serpent" album.

For Halloween 2022, Faderhead did another remix of "Halloween Spooky Queens", this time 48bpm faster than the original version.

Before Christmas 2022, Faderhead released an EP of acoustic versions of 4 of his songs. This EP was called "Therapy For One".

In April 2023, Faderhead released a 5 song EP called "The Ascender". The EP comes with a 60 page graphic novel, available for free download. Faderhead released "Noise Night" from that EP as the single, along with a music video.

In 2024, Faderhead released 11 singles, which were released on the first day of each new month from January to November. The band also played the main stage of Amphi Festival in Köln, Germany.

A hallmark of Faderhead's performances is the rotating lineup of live musicians. Faderhead's live shows are currently supported by either Danny "The Delta Mode" Bernath or Yannick Waldner and Raphael Fischer (Dancefloor Gladiatorz) or Elliott Berlin (Combichrist, Nidbild). He has also previously been supported live by Joel & Daniel Meyer (Project SAM) or Jörg Lütkemeier (Straftanz). The Hamburg producer/vocalist uses different musicians for live performances and has collaborated on stage with musicians like Daniel Myer (Haujobb), Shawn "Ultimate MC" Mierez or with Marco Visconti (formerly XP8) - nicknamed “The Lord” - who stood out as the longest-running member, supporting Faderhead from 2008 to 2018.

== Fistful of Fuck You video game ==
In 2014 an arcade beat 'em up based on the "Fistful of Fuck You" music video was released. Built on OpenBOR, an open-source variant of the Beats of Rage game engine, it includes official pixel-art sprites used in the video. It was re-released as "Faderhead 2.0" in 2018 including bugfixes and a two-player mode, tournament mode, and a "reverse mode". Added playable characters include members of industrial bands such as Andy LaPlegua of Combichrist, Steve Naghavi of And One, Chris Pohl of Blutengel, Daniel Graves of Aesthetic Perfection and Brian Graupner of The Gothsicles.

== Discography ==
=== Studio albums ===
- 2006: FH1 (Accession Records)
- 2007: FH2 (Accession Records)
- 2008: FH3 (L-Tracks Recordings)
- 2010: Black Friday (L-Tracks Recordings)
- 2012: The World of Faderhead (L-Tracks Recordings)
- 2013: FH4 (L-Tracks Recordings)
- 2014: Atoms & Emptiness (L-Tracks Recordings)
- 2016: FH-X (Not A Robot Records)
- 2017: Night Physics (Not A Robot Records)
- 2019: Asteria (Not A Robot Records)
- 2021: Years Of The Serpent (Not A Robot Records)

=== Compilation albums ===
- 2010: Trilogy (L-Tracks Recordings)
- 2012: Two Sides To Every Story (2CD) (L-Tracks Recordings)

=== EPs ===
- 2009: Horizon Born (L-Tracks Recordings)
- 2011: The Way to Fuck Clubs (L-Tracks Recordings)
- 2013: Empires of the Northern Lights v2.42 (Bandcamp)
- 2015: The Tokyo Tapes (Bandcamp)
- 2016: Anima In Machina (Not A Robot Records)
- 2016: The Universe Has Spoken (Not A Robot Records)
- 2017: No Signal (Not A Robot Records)
- 2018: Time Physics (Not A Robot Records)
- 2019: Starchaser (Not A Robot Records)
- 2020: 2077 (Not A Robot Records)
- 2022: Therapy For One (Not A Robot Records)
- 2023: The Ascender (Not A Robot Records)

=== Singles ===
- 2004: "The Protagonist"
- 2006: "OH Scavenger vs. the Protagonist"
- 2006: "Bassgod"
- 2008: "Exit Ghost"
- 2010: "69 Freaks Per Minute"
- 2013: "Artificial Bullshit (Demo)"
- 2017: "Know Your Darkness"
- 2020: "I Did Not Know" (feat. Solar Fake)
- 2020: "Halloween Spooky Queens"
- 2021: "Better" (feat. Chris Harms)
- 2021: "Halloween Spooky Queens v2021"
- 2022: "Dark Water"
- 2022: "Halloween Spooky Queens v2022"
- 2023: "Noise Night"
- 2024: "Burn All Night" (feat. Electra Black)
- 2024: "The Hell We Need"
- 2024: "Bring The Pain"
- 2024: "Breathe Again"
- 2024: "Die For This" (feat. Neuroticfish)
- 2024: "Souls Burned Black"
- 2024: "Emotional Baggage"
- 2024: "The Endless Descent"
- 2024: "Summer Rain"
- 2024: "Everything's Fucked Up" (feat. Chrome Dawg)
- 2024: "Goth Rave"

=== Music videos ===
- "Girly Show"
- "Exit Ghost"
- "Tanz Zwo Drei Vier"
- "Dirtygrrrls/Dirtybois" (ft. Ultimate MC)
- "Horizon Born" (Electric Paradise Club Edit)
- "Black Friday" (Short Movie)
- "Destroy Improve Rebuild"
- "The Way to Fuck God"
- "Fistful of Fuck You"
- "Older Now"
- "Inside of Me'
- "Dancers" (ft.Shawn Mierez & Shaolyn)
- "When the Freaks Come Out"
- "No Gods, No Flags, No Bullshit"
- "Escape Gravity"
- "From His Broken Bones"
- "I Did Not Know" (feat. Solar Fake)
- "Halloween Spooky Queens"
- "Better" (feat. Chris Harms)
- "Vanish (Acoustic Version)"
- "Too Dead For Life"
- "The Hell We Need"
- "Die For This" (feat. Neuroticfish)
- "The Endless Descent"
- "Noise Night"
- "All Black Everything"
- "Goth Rave"

=== Free download MP3 releases ===
- "Dirtygrrrls/Dirtybois" (N64 remix)
- "Going Home Alone" (DDT version)
- "In Bloom" (Remix of the Nirvana song)
- "SexyBack" (Justin Timberlake cover)
- "The Protagonist" (Doctor Retroid's B-Movie Ride of Doom remix)
- "White Wedding" (Billy Idol cover)
- "White Room" (Cream cover)
- "Living With Lions" (demo)
- "Death By Sushi"

=== Compilation releases ===
- 2006: Accession Records Volume Three (Bassgod)
- 2006: Bestie:Mensch (Dirtygrrrls Dirtybois (remix by [:SITD:]))
- 2007: Extreme Sündenfall 6 (Dirtygrrrls/Dirtybois (modulate remix))
- 2007: Fxxk the Mainstream Vol. 1 (Dirtygrrrls/Dirtybois (electro for the masses remix))
- 2009: Extreme Sündenfall 8 (TZDV (club version))
- 2009: Extreme Sündenfall 9 (Horizon Born (electric paradise club edit))
- 2010: Kinetik Festival Volume Three (69 Freaks Per Minute)
