= X-Fusion =

Solo electronic music project

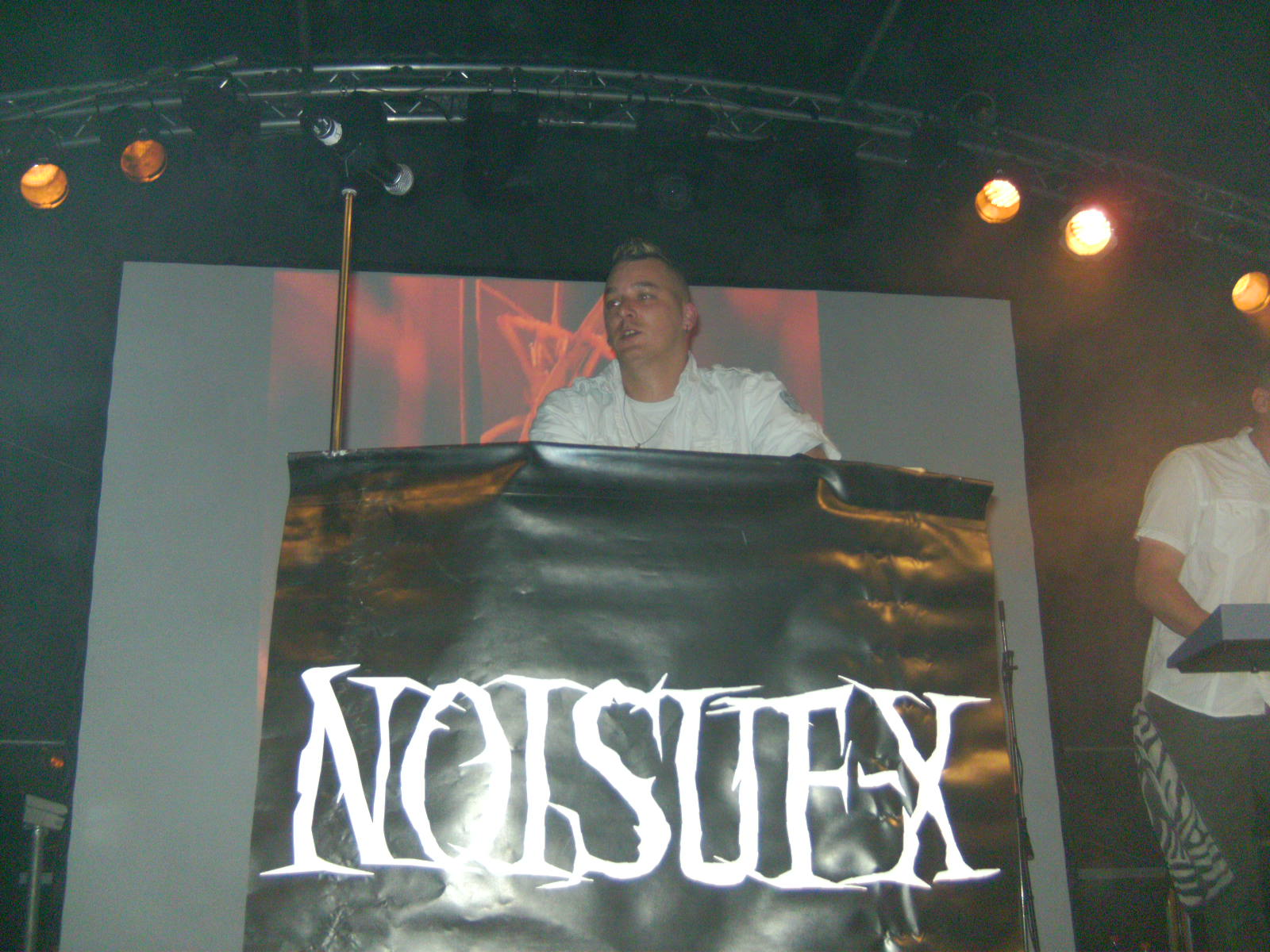
- Live performance as Noisuf-X at Essen Originell 2011

Background information
- Also known as: Noisuf-X
- Origin: Germany
- Genres: Industrial, dark electro, aggrotech, EBM, Neoclassical dark wave, Gothic Electro
- Years active: 1988–present
- Labels: Scanner, Dark Dimensions, Gravitator
- Members: Jan Loamfield (Jan L.)

X-Fusion is a solo electronic music project by German musician, producer and DJ, Jan Loamfield known as Jan L.. Loamfield began releasing acid house tracks in 1988, and by 2000, had moved to harsh industrial/aggrotech. Loamfield has also released several albums under a side project, Noisuf-X.

== Career ==
In 1988, Loamfield began producing music on a Commodore 64, in combination with organ sequences, before upgrading to better equipment. In 1991 his first demo tape, "Syndromic Noise", was released. This and its subsequent release are usually classified as hard trance. Loamfield soon began performing live at techno parties. His music after this point became darker, and evolved to aggrotech/dark electro. In 2003, he was signed by independent label Dark Dimensions/SCANNER, which marked the beginning of the X-Fusion project.

Loamfield used several neo-classical/orchestral goth elements in later releases, mixing industrial, Aggrotech/Hellektro and Gothic, Darkwave.

The 2004 album Beyond the Pale reached number 6 on the Deutsche Alternative Charts, and the 2007 album Rotten to the Core reached #16 for the year. In 2008, Vast Abysm went to #2, as did Ultima Ratio in 2009.

== Noisuf-X ==
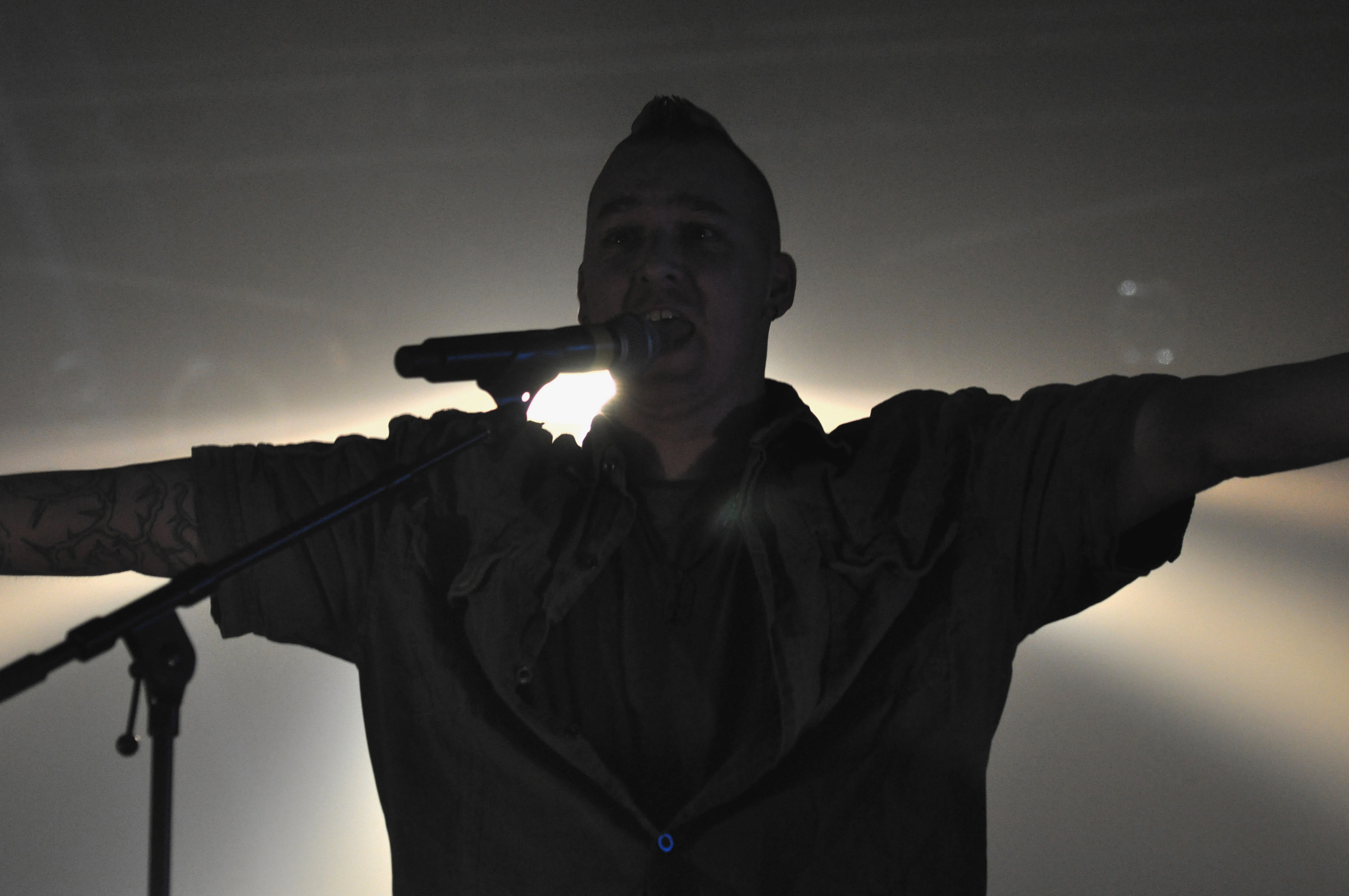
Jan L with Noisuf-X at the E-tropolis Festival 2013, Berlin

Noisuf-X is X-Fusion's side project launched in 2005, identified as power noise, with some techno-industrial and TBM influences. Noisuf-X has released 12 albums to date. The album Tinnitus peaked at #3 on the German Alternative Charts (DAC) and ranked #36 on the DAC Top Albums of 2006.

== Discography ==
=== Albums ===
- Evillive (2001)
- Blackout (2002)
- Dial D for Demons (2003)
- Beyond the Pale (2004)
- Demons of Hate (2005)
- Rotten to the Core (2007)
- Bloody Pictures (2007)
- Choir of Damnation (2007)
- Vast Abysm (2008)
- Inner Exile MCD (2008)
- Ultima Ratio (2009)
- Thorn in My Flesh (2011)
- What Remains is Black (2013)

=== Compilation albums ===
- deCODEr v2.0
- Endzeit Bunkertracks (3 acts)
- Cryonica Tanz V.4

=== As Noisuf-X ===
- Antipode (2005)
- Tinnitus EP (2006)
- The Beauty of Destruction (2007)
- Voodoo Ritual (2009)
- Excessive Exposure (2010)
- Dead End District (2011)
- Warning (2013)
- Invasion (2014)
- 10 Years of Riot (2015)
- Kicksome(b)ass (2016)
- Banzai (2017)
- Invader (2018)
