= Soman (band) =

Soman is a power noise/techno act from Germany. They have had several hits in the Deutsche Alternative Charts.

== Biography ==
Originally, Kolja Trelle worked as sound engineer with Absurd Minds, Hocico, and Terminal Choice, and remixed songs by VNV Nation, Rotersand, and Tom Wax. Trelle signed a record deal with Out of Line for his musical project Soman. Soman's debut album, Sound Pressure, was released in 2003.

In 2005, he released the single "Unleashed", which charted at number one on the Deutsche Alternative Charts (DAC).

His second album, Mask, was released in 2007 by Infacted Recordings in Europe and was licensed to COP International for a North American release. The following year saw the release of his third album, Re:Up, on Infacted and COP International.

Soman's debut album was reissued, with bonus tracks, via Infacted Recording for Europe in 2008 and Metropolis Records for America in 2009, under the title of Sound Pressure 2.0.

For live appearances, Soman supported VNV Nation on their Matter + Form tour in 2005, as played at WGT and M'era Luna Festival in 2006. In August 2007, he appeared at the Infest Festival in Bradford, England. He has worked with alternative artist Lahannya.

== Discography ==
- Sound Pressure (2003)
- Revenge (EP, 2004)
- Unleash (Single, 2005)
- Mask (2007)
- Re:Up (2008)
- Noistyle (2010)
- Nox (2019)
- Global (2020)
- Vision (2022)
