= Alfa Matrix =

Belgian record label

- Founded: 2001
- Genre: Electronic, industrial, EBM, dark electro, synthpop
- Country of origin: Belgium
- Location: Brussels
- Official website: www.alfa-matrix.com

Alfa Matrix is a Belgian record label. Founded in 2001, the label releases musical styles including aggrotech, industrial music, dark elektro, synthpop, and electronica.

Based in Brussels, the label consists of label and artists manager Séba Dolimont, promo manager Bernard Van Isacker, and head of design Benoît Blanchart. The label celebrated its 20th anniversary with a compilation release matriXX – 20 Years of Alfa Matrix in December 2021.

== Artists ==
- 32CRASH
- Acylum
- Adam X
- Agonised by Love
- !AïBoFoRcEn<-
- amGod
- Alien Vampires
- Armageddon Dildos
- Aesthetische
- Avarice In Audio
- Ayria (formerly)
- Bruderschaft
- Cosmic Armchair
- Crisk
- Cynical Existence
- Diffuzion
- Digital Factor
- Diskonnekted
- Dream Recall
- DR. Kövald
- Dunkelwerk
- Einheit Meister 08.11.81
- Entrzelle
- Epsilon Minus
- Essence of Mind
- Freakangel
- Front 242
- Glis
- Halo In Reverse
- HausHetaere
- Headscan
- Helalyn Flowers
- Hungry Lucy
- Implant
- Inure
- I:Scintilla
- Junksista
- Klutæ
- Kant Kino
- Komor Kommando
- Krystal System
- Leæther Strip
- Lovelorn Dolls
- Malakwa
- Male or Female
- Mari Chrome
- Mentallo and the Fixer
- Metroland
- Mind:state
- Miseria Ultima
- Mnemonic
- Mondträume
- Monolith
- Nebula-H
- Neikka RPM
- Nitzer Ebb
- Növö
- O.V.N.I.
- Plastic Noise Experience
- Prozium
- Psy'Aviah
- Razorfade
- Regenerator
- Reichsfeind
- Schwarzblut
- SD-KRTR (Simon Carter)
- Seize
- Sero.Overdose
- Simon Carter (SD-KRTR)
- Star Industry
- Stray
- Studio-X
- Suicidal Romance
- Suicide Inside
- Tamtrum
- Technoir
- Trisomie 21
- Unter Null
- Venal Flesh
- Virgins O.R. Pigeons
- Virtual><Embrace
- XMH
- Zombie Girl

== Compilation albums ==
- Square Matrix 003 (2003; featuring Plastic Noise Experience, Glis, Neikka RPM and Regenerator)
- Square Matrix 004 (2004; featuring Glis, Seize, Ayria and Dunkelwerk)
