= Electro-industrial =

Industrial music subgenre

- Stylistic origins: EBM; post-industrial
- Cultural origins: Early 1980s; Belgium, Canada, United States, France, and Germany
- Derivative forms: Dark electro; aggrotech

Other topics
- Industrial metal; IDM; rivethead; post-industrial music developments

Electro-industrial is a subgenre of post-industrial music that emerged in the early 1980s. It was originally pioneered by acts such as Front 242, Cabaret Voltaire, Front Line Assembly, Klinik, Numb, as well as groups from Canada, the United States and the Benelux.

Other influential acts included Canadian band Skinny Puppy, who signed to label Nettwerk, which served as a central hub that helped proliferate the style. By the early 1990s, electro-industrial spawned the dark electro genre, and later the aggrotech offshoot. The fan base for the style is linked to the rivethead subculture.

== Characteristics ==
After the EBM (electronic body music) movement faded in the early 1990s, electro-industrial increasingly attained popularity in the international club scene. In contrast to the straight EBM style, electro-industrial groups use harsher beats and raspy, distorted, or digitized vocals. In contrast to industrial rock, electro-industrial groups mostly avoided guitars, other than Skinny Puppy, who used electric guitar elements since the mid-'80s in songs like "Testure" or "Dig It", and Numb on songs like "God Is Dead". While EBM has a minimal structure and clean production, electro-industrial tends to have a grittier, complex and layered sound with a more experimental approach.

Electro-industrial was anticipated by 1980s groups such as SPK, Die Form, Test Dept, Borghesia, Klinik, Cabaret Voltaire, Front 242, Skinny Puppy, Numb, and Front Line Assembly.

Prominent electro-industrial groups of the 1990s include Mentallo and the Fixer, Nine Inch Nails, Yeht Mae, Velvet Acid Christ, and Pulse Legion (U.S.); Numb and Decoded Feedback (Canada); X Marks the Pedwalk, Plastic Noise Experience, Wumpscut, Haujobb, Forma Tadre, KMFDM, Putrefy Factor 7, and Abortive Gasp (Germany); Leæther Strip (Denmark); and early Hocico, Cenobita, and Amduscia (Mexico).

Since the mid-1990s, some electro-industrial groups added guitars and became associated with industrial metal; other groups, e. g. Skinny Puppy, Download, Gridlock, and Haujobb, have incorporated elements of experimental electronic music styles like drum and bass, IDM, glitch, and other electronica genres.

== Conceptual elements ==
Electro-industrial groups tend to feature themes of control, dystopia, and science fiction. Electro-industrial groups sometimes take aesthetic inspiration from horror films, including The Exorcist and the work of Roman Polanski, and the science fiction films Blade Runner and Alien.

== Derivatives ==
=== Dark electro ===
Dark electro is a subgenre of electro-industrial, developed in the early 1990s in central Europe. The term describes groups such as yelworC and Placebo Effect, and was first used in December 1992 with the album announcement of Brainstorming, yelworC's debut. The style was inspired by the music of The Klinik and Skinny Puppy. Compositions included gothic horror soundscapes, occult themes, and grunts or distorted vocals. yelworC were a music group from Munich, formed in 1988. They laid the foundations of the dark electro movement in the early 1990s, and were the first artist on the German label Celtic Circle Productions. In subsequent years, dark electro was displaced by techno-influenced styles such as aggrotech and futurepop. Other groups to practice the style included amGod, Trial, early Evil's Toy, Mortal Constraint, Arcana Obscura, Splatter Squall, Seven Trees, Tri-State, and Ice Ages.

=== Aggrotech ===
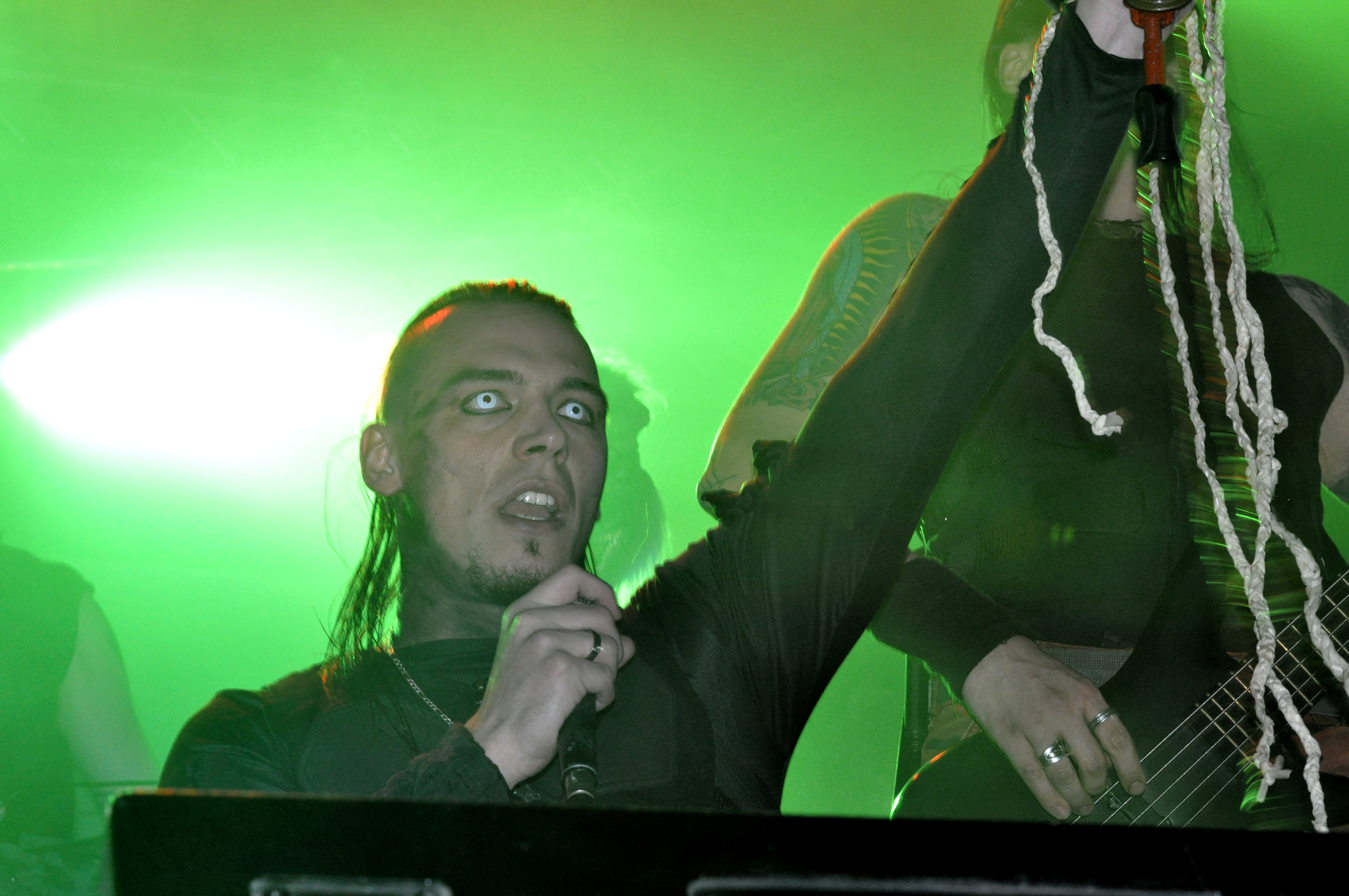
German aggrotech band Centhron at e-tropolis 2013, Berlin

Aggrotech (also known as hellektro and aggrotek) is a derivative form of dark-electro with a strong influence from industrial hardcore (straight techno bassdrum from Roland TR-909 and oscillator sounds, especially Supersaw leads from Roland JP-8000) that first surfaced in the mid- to late-1990s.

Aggrotech typically employs aggressive beats, prominent lead synth lines, and lyrics of a dark nature. Often, vocals are distorted and pitch-shifted to sound harsh and synthetic; static and glitching effects are also added. Aggrotech musicians include Agonoize, Amduscia, Bestias De Asalto, Combichrist, Dawn of Ashes, Detroit Diesel, Feindflug, God Module, Grendel, Hocico, iVardensphere, Nachtmahr, Panic Lift, Psyclon Nine, Reaper, Suicide Commando, The Retrosic, Ritual Aesthetic, Unter Null, Virtual Embrace, and X-Fusion, among many.

== See also ==
- List of industrial music festivals
- List of electro-industrial bands
