= Combichrist discography =

- Studio albums: 9
- Extended plays: 10
- Compilation albums: 1

The discography of Combichrist, an American aggrotech and EBM band based in Atlanta, Georgia, consists of nine studio albums, one retrospective album, ten extended plays, and many compilation and remixes.

== Albums ==
=== Studio albums ===
Year	Album
2003	The Joy of Gunz
2005	Everybody Hates You
2007	What the Fuck Is Wrong with You People?
2009	Today We Are All Demons
2010	Making Monsters
2013	No Redemption (Official DmC: Devil May Cry Soundtrack)
2014	We Love You
2016	This Is Where Death Begins
2019	One Fire
2024	CMBCRST
2026	The Venom In The Mouth Of God

=== Compilations ===
Year	Album
2010	Noise Collection Vol. 1

== EPs ==
Year	EPs	Label
2003	Kiss the Blade	Out of Line
2004	Blut Royale	Bractune Records
2004	Sex, Drogen und Industrial	Out of Line
2006	Get Your Body Beat	Out of Line / Metropolis Records
2008	Gothic Cruise	Out of Line / Metropolis Records
2008	Frost EP: Sent to Destroy	Out of Line / Metropolis Records
2009	Heat EP: All Pain is Beat	Out of Line / Metropolis Records
2010	Scarred	Out of Line / Metropolis Records
2010	Never Surrender	Out of Line / Metropolis Records
2011	Throat Full of Glass	Out of Line / Metropolis Records
2014	From My Cold Dead Hands	Out of Line / Metropolis Records
2022	Heads Off	Out of Line
2024	Planet Doom	Out of Line
2024	Violence Solves Everything Pt II (The End of a Dream)	Out of Line

== Music videos ==
Year	Video	Director
2005	"Blut Royale"	Sandra Jensen
2006	"Get Your Body Beat"	Agata Alexander
2007	"Electrohead"	Andy LaPlegua & Agata Alexander
2007	"Deathbed"	Andy LaPlegua & Agata Alexander
2007	"Fuck That Shit"	Brandon Duncan
2008	"Sent to Destroy"	Robyn Von Swank
2011	"Throat Full of Glass"	Chad Michael Ward
2014	"Maggots at the Party"	Jason Alacrity
2016	"Skullcrusher"	Andy LaPlegua
2016	"My Life My Rules"	Jason Alacrity
2019	"Hate Like Me"	Nils Freiwald
2019	"Understand"	Jason Alacrity
2021	"Not My Enemy"	Pavel Trebukhin
2021	"Compliance"	Pavel Trebukhin
2022	"Modern Demon"	Ingo Spörl
2022	"Heads Off"	Pavel Trebukhin
2024	"Planet Doom"	Ben Winston and Andy LaPlegua
2025	"RISE"	Victoria Anders

== Other compilations ==
Soundtracks
Year	Soundtrack	Song
2006	The Gene Generation	"Get Your Body Beat"
2006	The Gene Generation	"This Shit Will Fuck You Up"
2006	The Gene Generation	"What the Fuck Is Wrong with You?"
2006	The Gene Generation	"Electrohead"
2009	The Collector	"Shut Up and Bleed" (featuring W.A.S.T.E)
2009	Underworld: Rise of the Lycans	"Today We Are All Demons" (Beneath the World Mix)
2011	DmC: Devil May Cry gameplay trailer	"Never Surrender"
2012	Underworld: Awakening	"Bottle of Pain" (exclusive track)

Compilations
Year	Compilation	Song
2003	Extreme Jenseitshymnen Vol. 4	"Line to the Dead"
2003	Dark Awakening Vol. 4	"God Wrapped in Plastic"
2003	Awake the Machines Vol. 4	"Vater Unser"
2004	Intensivstation	"Vater Unser"
2004	Machineries of Joy 3	"Lying Sack of Shit"
2004	Industrial for the Masses Vol. 2	"Strike" and "Without Emotions"
2004	15 Minutes into the Future	"Das Der Bunker"
2004	Per:Version: Vol 14	"Blut Royale"
2005	Aderlass Vol. 3	"Sex, Drogen & Industri" (Soman Mix)
2005	Electrixmas	"This Shit Will Fuck You Up"
2005	Endzeit Bunkertracks: Act I	"Tractor"
2005	This Is... Techno Body Music	"This Is TBM"
2005	Extreme Club Hits X	"Enjoy the Abuse"
2005	Zillo Club Hits 10	"This Shit Will Fuck You Up"
2005	Synth & Wave Essential Vol. 2	"Sex, Drogen Und Industrial" (Low Tech Mix)
2005	Cyberl@b Volume [5.0]	"This Shit Will Fuck You Up"
2005	Metropolis 2005	"Blut Royale"
2005	M'er Luna Festival 2005	"This Shit Will Fuck You Up"
2005	Extreme Sunderfall2	"This Is My Rifle"
2006	Das Bunker: Fear of a Distorted Planet	"Christus Commando"
2006	Industrial for the Masses Vol. 3	"Electrohead"
2006	13th Street - The Sound of Mystery 2	"Today I Woke to the Rain of Blood"
2006	Metropolis 2006	"Get Your Body Beat"
2006	ElektroStat 2006	"Blut Royale"
2006	Extended Electronics	"This Is My Rifle" (Extended Remix by Sergio Mesa)
2006	Dark Flowers Vol. II	"Blut Royale"
2006	Aderlass Vol. 4	"Without Emotions"
2007	Aderlass Vol. 5	"Electrohead"
2007	Machineries of Joy Volume 4	"Hate and Booze" (featuring Helltrash)
2007	13th Street the Sound of Mystery 3	"Get Your Body Beat"
2007	Zillo Club Hits Vol. 12	"Electrohead"
2007	When Angels Die	"This Is My Rifle" (Faderhead Remix)
2008	Industrial Attack Vol.2	"Electrohead"
2008	Awake the Machines Vol. 6	"Prince of E-Ville" (Chicago Club Mix by Accessory)
2008	EOD Vol. 2	"What the Fuck is Wrong with You People?"
2008	Sonic Seducer Cold Hands Seduction Vol. 89	"Sent to Destroy"
2008	Das Bunker 4: Brighter Than a Thousand Suns	"A New Form of Silence"
2008	Extreme Lustlieder 1	"Shut Up and Swallow"
2009	Metropolis Rebirth 2.0	"All Pain Is Gone" (Rapid Ascent Mix)
2009	Gothic Spirits - EBM Edition	"All Pain Is Gone"
2009	Electrostorm	"Scarred"
2010	Sthilmann - Tunning Blaster	"Never Surrender" (Sthilmann Club Mix)
2010	Electronic Saviors: Industrial Music to Cure Cancer	"Nosepad"
2010	Zillo CD-09/2010	"Slave to the Machine"
2010	Amphi Festival 2010	"Get Out of My Head"
2010	Zillo-Festival-CD 07-08/10	"Kickstart the Fight"
2010	Electrostorm Volume 2	"Can't Change the Beat"
2010	Industrial for the Masses Vol. 4	"Penalty Shot"
2010	Endzeit Bunkertracks [Act V]	"All Pain Is Gone"
2011	Awake the Machines Vol. 7	"Slave to Machine"
2011	Electronic Body Matrix 1	"Never Surrender" (Terrence Fixmer Remix)

=== Remixes by Combichrist/Andy LaPlegua/DJ Scandy ===
Artist	Song information
Ad Inferna	Vertige (Combichrist Remix)
Aesthetic Perfection	Inhuman (Combichrist Remix)
Agonoize	Chains of Love (Destruction Remix)
Angelspit	100% (99% Rawmix)
Angelspit	100% (110% Fucked Mix)
Assemblage 23	Spark (Combichrist Mix)
The Azoic	Conflict (Combichrist Mix)
The Birthday Massacre	Shallow Grave (Combichrist)
C + C Music Factory	Gonna Make You Sweat (Everybody Dance Now) (as Combichrist)
Cylab	Kundalini (Lucky 13 Mix)
Dive vs. Diskonnekted	Do You Believe It (Combichrist Mix)
Down Below	Private Soul Security (Electronix Remix By Scandy)
Eisbrecher	Verrückt (Combichrist Remix)
FGFC820	Existence (Combichrist Remix)
Front Line Assembly	Beneath the Rubble (Combichrist Remix)
Hocico	Ruptura (Motherfucker 667 Remix)
I:Scintilla	Havestar (Combichrist Mix)
IAMX	You Can Be Happy (Combichrist Remix)
Icon of Coil	Perfect Sex (Scandy Remix)
Icon of Coil	Transfer Complete (Pitch Black Mix By D.r.i.v.E.)
Icon of Coil	Android (Mix by Combichrist)
Icon of Coil	Dying Breed (digital remix by Scandy)
Icon of Coil	Regret (Combichrist Remix)
Icon of Coil	Shelter (According to Combichrist)
Interface	Faith in Nothing (Combichrist No Faith Mix)
Imperative Reaction	Surface (Under the Surface Remix by Scandy)
Julien-K	Systeme de Sexe (Combichrist Remix)
KMFDM	Tohuvabohu (MS 20 Mix)
KMFDM	Bait & Switch (All 4 One Mix)
The Left Rights	White ("Starfucks" Remix by Combichrist)
Left Spine Down	Last Daze from the 2009 album Voltage 2.3: Remixed and Revisited
Manufactura	Sex and Suicide (This is What You Need Mix by Combichrist)
Mindless Self Indulgence	(It's 3AM) Issues (Scandy Remix)
Mindless Self Indulgence	Never Wanted to Dance (Electro Hurtz Mix)
Mindless Self Indulgence	Straight to Video (Mix According to Combichrist)
Mindless Self Indulgence	Fuck Machine (Scandinavian Cock Mix)
Mindless Self Indulgence	Fuck Machine (Combichrist Remix)
Modulate	Skullfuck (Combichrist Remix)
Motionless in White	Sinematic (Combichrist Remix)
Morbid Angel	Destructos Vs. the Earth (remixed by Combichrist)
Porn	A Lovely Day (Combichrist Remix)
Sevendaysofnight	Free Your Mind [Rock the Dancefloor Mix by Combichrist]
Snakeskin	I Am the Dark (Electronoir Mix)
Suicide Commando	Fuck You, Bitch (Combichrist Remix)
Surgery	L'erba Cattiva (Combichrist Remix)
Tamtrum	Abort the Pope (Combichrist Remix)
The Birthday Massacre	Shallow Grave (Combichrist 'Good For Her' Mix)
Trick & Kubick	Can't Stop (Scandy Remix)
Tristesse De La Lune	Time Is Moving (Remix By Panzer AG)
Tristesse De La Lune	Queen Of The Damned (Laplegua Mix)
Warren Suicide	Butcher Boy (Combichrist Remix)

=== Remixes of Combichrist ===
Song	Remix information
"Kiss the Blade"	Motherfucker 667 Mix
"Kiss the Blade"	Frequency Cabrone 667 Mix
"Kiss the Blade"	Remixed by Soman
"Sex, Drogen und Industrial"	Addicted Remix by SolaceRED (download track only)
"Sex, Drogen und Industrial"	Soman
"Sex, Drogen und Industrial"	Lowtech
"Sex, Drogen und Industrial"	(are missing) (Cross mix) feat. E.R.R.A.
"Sex, Drogen und Industrial"	Unknown Mix
"Vater Unser"	Combicritters Remix
"This Is My Rifle"	(Happy Fucking Rifle Remix) (Lo-Fi Legion)
"This Is My Rifle"	BioMechAnimal Mix by XP8
"This Is My Rifle"	AK47 Mix by Controlled Collapse
"This Is My Rifle"	BFG Remix by Servo.Hatred
"This Is My Rifle"	Pussy Pounding Mix by Encoder
"This Is My Rifle"	Spoils of War Remix by Kandelectra
"This Is My Rifle"	UCNX Mix
"This Is My Rifle"	Killswitch Remix
"This Is My Rifle"	Zyst3m 3rror Re.mix by ZyVar +2
"This Is My Rifle"	CL-Macromix by Caustic Light
"This Is My Rifle"	Gravemachine Mix
"This Is My Rifle"	TU-160 Remix
"This Is My Rifle"	5ilent Narcotic Remix
"This Is My Rifle"	Flesh Eating Foundation Remix
"This Is My Rifle"	Adipocere Remix
"This Is My Rifle"	Bang, You're Dead Mix by Catharsis
"This Is My Rifle"	B'christ Mix by Afront
"This Is My Rifle"	Exit-Wound Mix by Fatal Rupture
"This Is My Rifle"	Lasergun Remix by T3CHN0PH0B1A
"This Is My Rifle"	Reverie Remix
"This Is My Rifle"	Fuck Off RMX by Amd
"This Is My Rifle"	Sthilmann Remix
"This Is My Rifle"	Vietcong Remix by Attack
"This Is My Rifle"	sOuNd_oF-cHaOs Remix
"This Is My Rifle"	PukesPantiesPussy Remix by AntI-EstaticA
"This Is My Rifle"	Remix by Anthony Chapman
"This Is My Rifle"	Sothis216 "Riffle Pussy" Remix
"This Is My Rifle"	Faderhead Remix
"This Is My Rifle"	Oni Remix
"This Is My Rifle"	Infernal Droid Remix
"This Is My Rifle"	Masoschizm Remix
"Blut Royale"	Instru-Mental Version
"Get Your Body Beat"	(Käpt'n K Mix by Sascha Konietzko of KMFDM)
"Get Your Body Beat"	Rotten Blood Remix by Amduscia
"Get Your Body Beat"	Shooting Up Remix by Point45
"Get Your Body Beat"	Tortured Remix by Manufactura
"Get Your Body Beat"	Remixed by Spetsnaz
"Get Your Body Beat"	Remixed by Sergio Mesa
"Get Your Body Beat"	Beat By Beat Remix by Controlled Collapse
"Get Your Body Beat"	(NOS remix) featuring Amduscia
"Like to Thank My Buddies"	(Re]-Verp) mix by [Syn]thetic-Null
"Get Outta My Head"	Combichrist VS Ashlee Simpson (She's a Psycho Bitch Remix by Deader)
"Today We Are All Demons"	(Beneath the World Mix) on Underworld: Rise of the Lycans Soundtrack
"Sent to Destroy"	(Reworked by Rotersand)
"Sent to Destroy"	Northborne Remix
"Sent to Destroy"	Sacrifice Remix by Suicide Commando
"Prince of E-Ville"	(Princess Mix by Babyland)
"Prince of E-Ville"	Chicago Club Mix by Accessory
"Prince of E-Ville"	Caustic Remix
"All Pain Is Gone"	Rapid Ascent Mix by VNV Nation
"All Pain Is Gone"	Matthew Grim Deathmix
"Can't Change the Beat"	(Designer Drugs Remix)
"Can't Change the Beat"	Aesthetic Perfection Remix
"Can't Change the Beat"	Remixed By Vaughn_e
"Can't Change the Beat"	Assemblage 23 Remix
"Scarred"	(Single Version Feat. Wes Borland)
"Scarred"	(Club Mix)
"Scarred"	Pull Out Kings Remix
"Scarred"	Shok's Zeitmahl Remix
"Scarred"	Imperative Reaction Remix
"Never Surrender"	IAMX Rework
"Never Surrender"	Remix by MELT
"Never Surrender"	Terrence Fixmer Remix
"Throat Full of Glass"	Tough Guy Mix by S.A.M.
"Throat Full of Glass"	Vocal Mix by Computer Club
"Throat Full of Glass"	Dub Mix by Computer Club
"Throat Full of Glass"	Renegade of Noise Mix by Daniel Myer
"Intruder Alert"	Remix by The Alambrix
