= Andy LaPlegua =

Norwegian singer

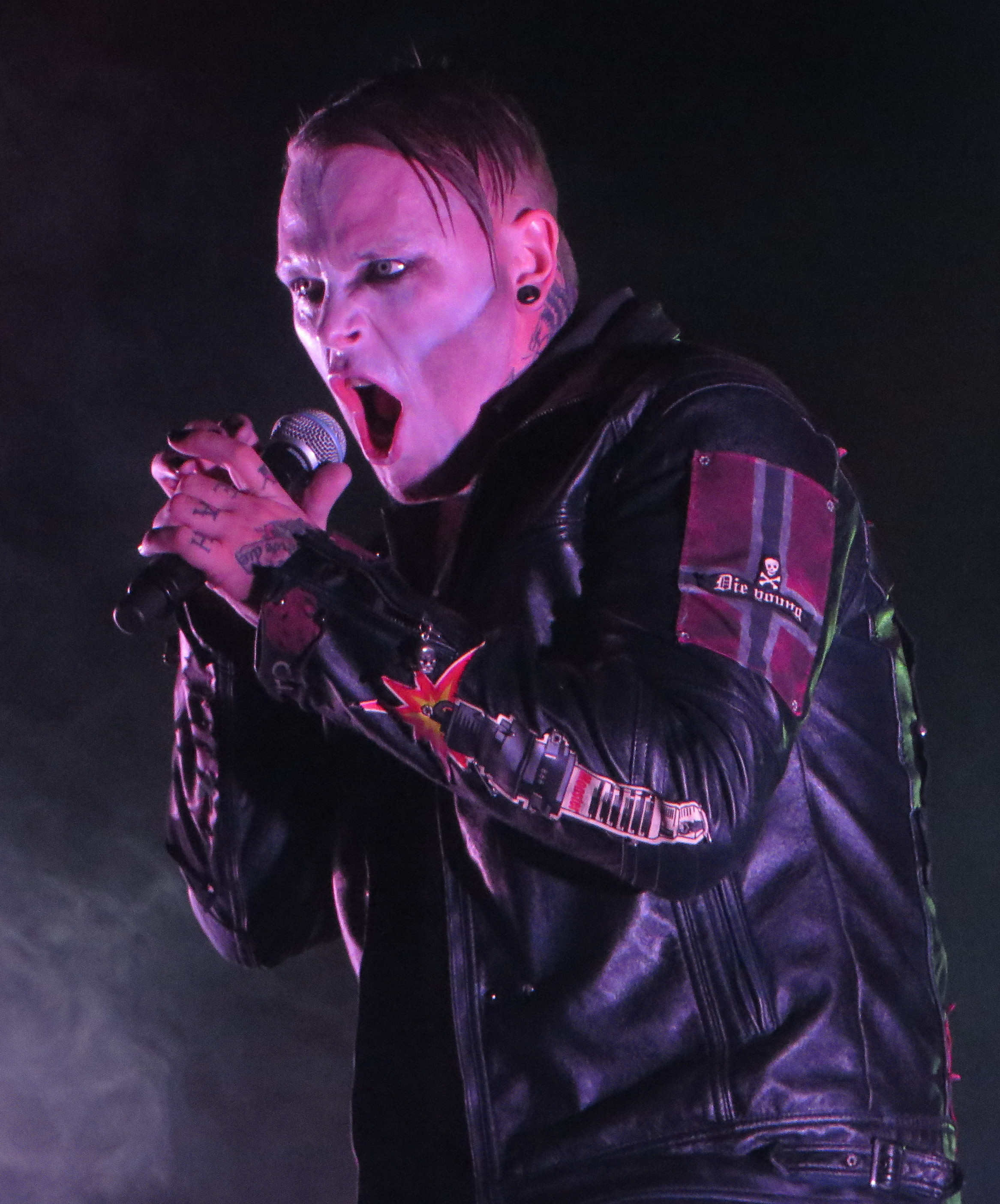
- LaPlegua performing with Combichrist in 2014

Background information
- Born: Ole Anders Olsen; 15 September 1975 (age 51); Fredrikstad, Norway
- Genres: Aggrotech, electro-industrial, heavy metal, industrial metal, industrial rock, futurepop
- Occupations: Singer, songwriter
- Spouse: Sophia Thomalla (m. 2016; div. 2017)

Ole Anders Olsen (born 15 September 1975), known professionally as Andy LaPlegua, is a Norwegian singer, originally known for being founder and lead vocalist of futurepop band Icon of Coil. He also gained fame in the aggrotech and electro-industrial scenes as founder and lead vocalist of Combichrist and Panzer AG.

== Biography ==
Following the death of Prince, LaPlegua revealed that the biggest musical influences in his life growing up in the early '80s were David Bowie, Motörhead, Prince, The Cure, and Dead Kennedys.

Originally a part of several scenes in Norway, LaPlegua experimented with hip-hop in the Detroit techno/Old School band LAW, industrial in Devils into Crime, punk in My Right Choice/Fleshfire and metal in Lash Out. He also found interest in trance and club music making his mark on the scene with his involvement in the bands Plastic Life and Sector9.

Early on, he was the vocalist in Fredrikstad based hardcore/metal band My Right Choice - who released an EP under the project name Fleshfire, as well as stand-in (and later permanent) vocalist for Lash Out. Icon of Coil was formed as a solo project in 1997. After becoming very enthusiastic about the music and its possibilities, LaPlegua invited a former bandmate of his, Sebastian Komor to join Icon of Coil to perform live. After several public performances and the release of "Shallow Nation", IoC's first album, Komor joined the band full-time.

Combichrist was officially launched in 2003. It was created as a more aggressive alternative to Icon of Coil. Panzer AG was officially launched in 2004. LaPlegua combined the danceability of Icon of Coil and the hard-hitting beats of Combichrist when he created Panzer AG. His fourth, most techno-oriented project, is (DJ) Scandy. His new project, Scandinavian Cock, is a rockabilly/psychobilly act.

== Personal life ==
LaPlegua and Kellie Olsen divorced in 2008. He then was married to German model and actress Sophia Thomalla in March 2016, and they announced their divorce a year later in May 2017. In December 2018 he was engaged to Liv Blankenship; they married in 2020. As of March 2024, he is engaged to Maegan McKenney.

== Discography ==
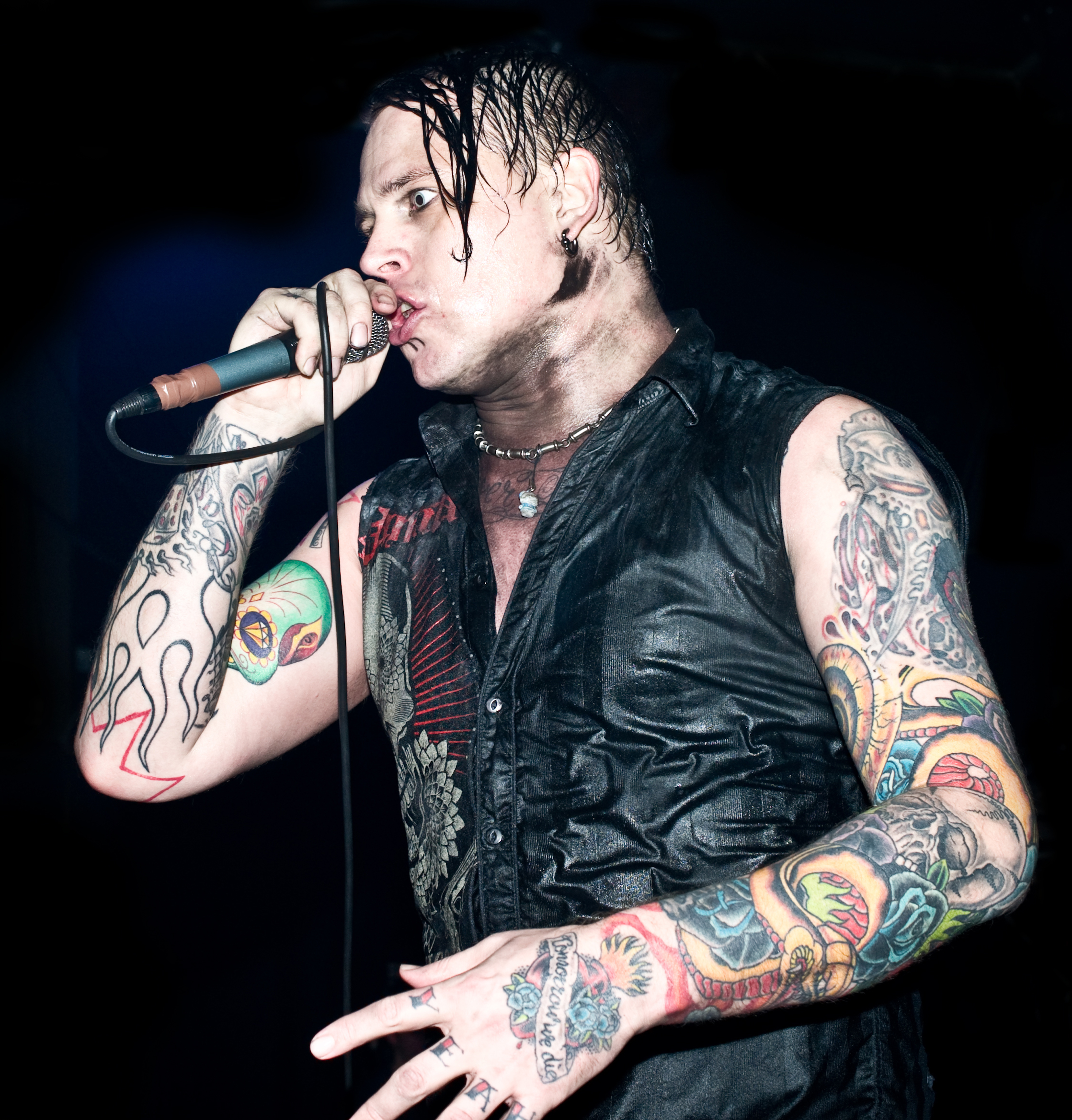
LaPlegua performing in 2010

=== EP ===
- One Nation Under Beat (Icon of Coil) Tatra Records 2000
- Shallow Nation (Icon of Coil) Tatra Records 2000
- Serene (Icon of Coil) Tatra Records 2001
- Access and Amplify (Icon of Coil) Tatra Records 2002
- Kiss the Blade (as Combichrist) Out of Line Music 2003
- Android (Icon of Coil) Out of Line Music 2003
- Blut Royale, 12" vinyl (Combichrist) Bractune Records 2004
- Sex, Drogen und Industrial (as Combichrist) Out of Line Music 2004
- Split (as DJ Scandy) Great Stuff Recordings 2004
- Rock Me / Split / So Do Eye (as Scandy) Maelstrom Records 2005
- So Do Eye (as Scandy) Craft Music 2005
- Get Your Body Beat (as Combichrist) Out of Line Music / Metropolis Records 2006
- Frost EP: Sent to Destroy (as Combichrist) Out of Line Music / Metropolis Records 2008
- Heat EP: All Pain Is Beat (as Combichrist) Out of Line Music / Metropolis Records 2009
- Scarred EP (as Combichrist) Out of Line Music / Metropolis Records 2010
- Never Surrender EP (as Combichrist) Out of Line Music / Metropolis Records 2010
- Uncut EP (as Scandinavian Cock) Metropolis Records 2011
- Throat Full of Glass (as Combichrist) Out of Line Music / Metropolis Records 2011
- "Heads Off" (as Combichrist) Out of Line Music 2022
- "Planet Doom" (as Combichrist) Out of Line Music 2024
- "Violence Solves Everything Part II (The End of a dream)" (as Combichrist) Out of Line Music 2024

=== LP ===
- Serenity Is the Devil (as Icon of Coil) Tatra Records / Out of Line Music / Metropolis Records 2000
- The Soul Is in the Software (as Icon of Coil) Tatra Records / Out of Line Music / Metropolis Records 2002
- The Joy of Gunz (as Combichrist) Out of Line Music 2003
- This is My Battlefield (as Panzer AG) Accession Records / Metropolis Records 2004
- Machines Are Us (as Icon of Coil) Out of Line / Metropolis Records 2004
- UploadedAndRemixed (as Icon of Coil) Out of Line / Metropolis Records 2004
- Everybody Hates You (as Combichrist) Out of Line / Metropolis Records 2005
- Your World Is Burning (as Panzer AG) Accession Records / Metropolis Records 2006
- 13 Ways to Masturbate (as Scandy) Masterhit Recordings 2006
- What the Fuck Is Wrong with You People? (as Combichrist) Out of Line / Metropolis Records 2007
- Today We Are All Demons (as Combichrist) Out of Line / Metropolis Records 2009
- Noise Collection Vol. 1 (as Combichrist) Metropolis Records 2010
- Making Monsters (as Combichrist) Out of Line / Metropolis Records 2010
- No Redemption (Official DmC: Devil May Cry Soundtrack) (as Combichrist) 2013
- We Love You (as Combichrist) 2014
- This Is Where Death Begins (as Combichrist) 2016
- One Fire (as Combichrist) 2019
- CMBCRST (as Combichrist) 2024
