= Music of the Devil May Cry series =

The Devil May Cry series has seen the release of seven separate soundtracks. Initially, Capcom was very reluctant to release an officially sanctioned soundtrack for the Devil May Cry series, due to worries that the products would sell poorly. As a means of testing the market, Capcom decided to ask for pre-release sales.

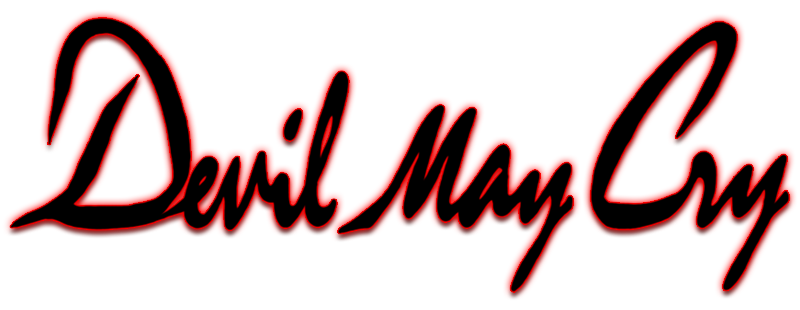
Devil May Cry Logo

After the pre-release sales were met, the Devil May Cry and Devil May Cry 2 soundtracks were released to the public on October 15, 2004. Both were released as separate 2-disc sets, with Masami Ueda, Misao Senbongi, and Masato Koda credited as producers for the Devil May Cry soundtrack and Masato Koda, Tetsuya Shibata and Satoshi Ise credited as producers for the Devil May Cry 2 soundtrack.

== Original soundtrack ==
=== Devil May Cry ===
Devil May Cry Original Soundtrack

Soundtrack album by Capcom
- Released: October 15, 2004
- Genre: Video Game Soundtrack
- Length: 133:40
- Producer: Masami Ueda, Misao Senbongi, Masato Koda

Professional ratings
Review scores
Source	Rating
Square Enix Music	9/10

Track listing

#	Title	Length
1.	"Let's Rock! (Title)"	0:19
2.	"The Theme of Sparda - Devil Sunday (Sparda's Theme)"	0:42
3.	"EV-01 (Opening)"	3:15
4.	"GM-01 (Mission Start)"	1:42
5.	"ST-01 (Old Castle Stage)"	3:52
6.	"PUBLIC ENEMY (Regular Battle 1)"	2:50
7.	"GM-02 (Continue)"	1:30
8.	"EV-02 (Alastor Acquired)"	1:25
9.	"GM-03 (Image of the God of Space-Time)"	2:57
10.	"ST-02 (Cathedral)"	3:56
11.	"EV-03 (Sin Scissors Appears)"	0:39
12.	"ST-03 (Ocean Floor Stage)"	1:13
13.	"Red-hot Juice (Phantom Appears)"	2:17
14.	"Psycho Siren (Mid-Boss Battle)"	1:40
15.	"EV-04 (Nelo Angelo Appears)"	1:09
16.	"Ultra Violet (Nelo Angelo Battle)"	3:21
17.	"EV-05 (Dante Cornered)"	0:43
18.	"ST-04 (Beneath Old Castle Stage)"	3:41
19.	"EV-06 (Beelzebub Appears)"	0:27
20.	"EV-07 (Phantom Appears)"	0:50
21.	"EV-08 (Traces of Sparda)"	1:23
22.	"Lock & Load (Blade Appears - Regular Battle 2)"	2:43
23.	"EV-09 (Ifrit Acquired)"	0:27
24.	"Flock Off! (Griffon Appears - Battle)"	2:44
25.	"EV-10 (Fetish Appears)"	0:43
26.	"ST-05 (Green Garden)"	2:41
27.	"EV-11 (Nelo Angelo Appears - Battle Ver. 2)"	0:35
28.	"EV-12 (Ghost Ship - Setting Sail)"	0:27
29.	"EV-13 (Griffon Appears - Battle Ver. 2)"	1:18
30.	"EV-14 (Ghost Ship - Sinking)"	0:33
31.	"ST-06 (Underwater Stage)"	2:18
32.	"ST-07 (Colosseum)"	4:05
33.	"EV-15 (Griffon Appears - Battle Ver. 3)"	0:29
34.	"EV-16 (Swearing On My Father's Name)"	2:02
35.	"GM-04 (Mission Clear)"	1:21

#	Title	Length
1.	"GM-05 (Mission Start)"	1:36
2.	"Karnival (Nighttime Old Castle Stage - Plasma Appears)"	3:26
3.	"Mental Machine (Nightmare Battle)"	3:07
4.	"ST-08 (Nightmare Space)"	2:01
5.	"Anarchy in the U.W. (Battle in Hell)"	2:32
6.	"Super Ultra Violet (Nelo Angelo Appears - Battle Ver. 3)"	3:45
7.	"EV-17 (The Truth)"	0:50
8.	"EV-18 (Magic Sword Sparda Acquired)"	0:34
9.	"Evil Vacuum (Hell)"	4:18
10.	"EV-19 (Nobody Appears)"	0:21
11.	"EV-20 (Magic Nightmare Barrier - Battle)"	0:53
12.	"EV-21 (Betrayal)"	0:35
13.	"The Theme of Eva (Eva's Theme)"	1:20
14.	"Final Penetration (Hell Stage)"	3:40
15.	"ST-09 (Hell's Great Temple)"	1:59
16.	"EV-22 (A Scheme)"	1:30
17.	"EV-23 (Demon Emperor Mundus Appears)"	0:40
18.	"EV-24 (A Mother's Revenge)"	0:42
19.	"EV-25 (Awakening)"	0:18
20.	"Legendary Battle (Demon Emperor Mundus Battle 1: In the Sky)"	4:41
21.	"EV-26 (Dante Falls to the Earth)"	0:12
22.	"Legendary Battle Ver. 2 (Demon Emperor Mundus Battle 2: On the Ground)"	3:05
23.	"EV-27 (Collapse of the Demon Emperor Mundus)"	0:19
24.	"The Theme of Trish (Trish's Theme)"	1:34
25.	"Bloody Bladder (Escape from Hell)"	2:07
26.	"EV-28 (Demon Emperor Mundus Again)"	0:37
27.	"ST-10 (Demon Emperor Mundus Battle 3: Underground)"	2:47
28.	"EV-29 (Mother's Voice - Trish Appears)"	1:10
29.	"EV-30 (Reunion - A Moment Before Death)"	1:25
30.	"I'm Coming! (Escape)"	0:44
31.	"Blue Orgasm (Blue Heavens)"	1:12
32.	"Dante & Trish ~ Seeds of Love (Staff Roll)"	4:03
33.	"Pillow Talk (Ranking Ver. 1)"	2:14
34.	"Pillow Talk Again (Ranking Ver. 2)"	2:14
35.	"GM-06 (Game Over)"	0:46
36.	"Super Public Enemy (Sparda Battle 1)"	2:32
37.	"S (Sparda Battle 2)"	2:09
38.	"Lock & Load Original"	2:51

=== Devil May Cry 2 ===
Devil May Cry 2 Original Soundtrack

Soundtrack album by Capcom
- Released: October 15, 2004
- Genre: Video Game Soundtrack
- Length: 101:02
- Label: Suleputer
- Producer: Masato Koda, Tetsuya Shibata, Satoshi Ise

Professional ratings
Review scores
Source	Rating
VGMdb	4.07/5
Discogs	4/5 stars

Track listing

#	Title	Length
1.	"Dance with Devils"	1:34
2.	"Overture"	1:49
3.	"Mission Start"	1:31
4.	"Eye of the Wind (Lower Town)"	2:08
5.	"Fire Away (Dante Battle 1)"	1:16
6.	"Wings of the Guardian (Lucia Battle 1)"	2:17
7.	"A Prayer for Goddess (Lucia Battle 2)"	1:39
8.	"Mission Clear"	0:51
9.	"Old Lady"	1:07
10.	"Underground (Catacomb)"	2:09
11.	"Eternal (Clock Tower)"	2:00
12.	"Cursed Giant (Orangguerra/Tartarussian Battle"	3:02
13.	"Continue"	1:07
14.	"Game Over"	0:19
15.	"Bust the Beast (Goatling/Phantom Battle)"	2:50
16.	"New Factor"	0:20
17.	"Parasitic Evil (Jokatgulm Battle)"	2:38
18.	"Eye of the Wind (Uppertown)"	3:23
19.	"Assault (Infested Chopper Battle)"	2:20
20.	"Evil Tower (Nefasturris Battle)"	3:57
21.	"Mad Factory (Factory)"	1:54
22.	"Faithful Servant (Furiataurus Battle)"	3:02
23.	"Realize, Regret...Resolution"	1:53
24.	"Defective Truth"	1:43
25.	"Blast Off!"	1:19

#	Title	Length
1.	"Mysterious Ruins (Dante Ruins)"	2:25
2.	"Unholy Relics (Lucia Ruins)"	2:36
3.	"Shoot the Works (Dante Battle 2)"	2:55
4.	"Demon's Paradise (Lucia Battle 2)"	1:40
5.	"Uncanny Noise (Noctpteran/Trismagia Battle)"	3:13
6.	"Encounter"	0:57
7.	"Power of Will"	0:39
8.	"Destructive Step (Lower Town, Hell Version)"	1:39
9.	"Blasphemy (Uroboros Building)"	2:12
10.	"A Praise of Evil"	0:39
11.	"Cry for the Moon (Arius Battle)"	3:46
12.	"Please Kill Me"	1:01
13.	"Chaotic Gloria"	0:37
14.	"Sacred Tears"	1:32
15.	"Against the Fate"	2:43
16.	"Darkness Instinct (Argosax the Chaos Battle)"	4:30
17.	"Ragnarok (The Despair Embodied Battle)"	4:02
18.	"Jackpot!"	0:44
19.	"All the Way to Hell"	0:15
20.	"Telling Sweet Lies"	0:58
21.	"Heads or Tails (Staffroll)"	3:51
22.	"~Epilogue~"	0:49
23.	"Total Result"	2:35
24.	"Mode Select"	1:20
25.	"Show Time! (Trish Battle 1)"	2:17
26.	"Spark it Up! (Trish Battle 2)"	2:38

=== Devil May Cry 3 ===
Devil May Cry 3 Original Soundtrack

Soundtrack album by Capcom
- Released: March 31, 2005
- Genre: Video Game Soundtrack, industrial, rock
- Length: 196:38
- Label: Suleputer
- Producer: Tetsuya Shibata, Kento Hasegawa

Professional ratings
Review scores
Source	Rating
Square Enix Music	7/10
Amazon	3.7/5 stars
VGMdb	4/5 stars

After the success of the Devil May Cry Original Soundtrack and Devil May Cry 2 Original Soundtrack, Capcom decided to release the Devil May Cry 3 Original Soundtrack on March 31, 2005, shortly after the release of Devil May Cry 3: Dante's Awakening, with Tetsuya Shibata and Kento Hasegawa credited as the producers. This was released as a 3-disc set.

The vocal songs from Devil May Cry 3 were written and the rough vocals performed by Shawn "Shootie HG" McPherson of heavy metal band Hostile Groove, with David Baker performing the more melodic vocals.

Track listing

#	Title	Length
1.	"Prologue"	1:48
2.	"Opening"	1:24
3.	"Dante's Office 7 Hells Battle"	2:11
4.	"M-1 End (To Vergil!)"	0:37
5.	"Mission Start"	2:42
6.	"M-2 Start (Dante's Office 7 Hells Appearance)"	0:25
7.	"Battle-1 (Battle Music 1)"	3:57
8.	"M-2 End (Tower (Temen-Ni-Gru) Appearance)"	0:22
9.	"Mission Clear"	1:20
10.	"M-3 Start (Vergil and Arkham Seen at the Top of the Tower)"	1:35
11.	"Stage Music 1 (Mission 3 Stage)"	2:50
12.	"Cerberus Appearance"	0:31
13.	"Cerberus Battle"	4:02
14.	"Continue"	1:19
15.	"Cerberus Defeated ~ Three-Rod Ice Weapon Cerberus"	0:20
16.	"M-3 End (Lady's Appearance)"	0:56
17.	"M-4 Start (Arkham Faces Lady's Rejection)"	0:53
18.	"Stage Music 2 (Temen-Ni-Gru 1F ~ 2F)"	2:52
19.	"Enigma Appearance - Battle"	0:42
20.	"Gigapede Appearance"	0:13
21.	"Gigapede Battle"	2:47
22.	"M-4 End (Jester's Appearance)"	1:11
23.	"M-5 Start (Blood-Goyle Appearance ~ Battle)"	1:13
24.	"Agni & Rudra Appearance"	0:18
25.	"Agni & Rudra Battle"	3:46
26.	"M-5 End (Agni & Rudra Defeated - Flame & Tornado Blades Agni & Rudra)"	0:22
27.	"M-6 Start (Lady v.s. 7 Hells)"	1:34
28.	"Stage Music 3 (Inside Temen-Ni-Gru Upper Levels)"	1:58
29.	"M-6 End (Lady Falls)"	0:57
30.	"M-7 Start (Catch Lady)"	0:33
31.	"Vergil Appearance"	1:11
32.	"Vergil Battle 1"	2:37
33.	"M-7 End (Demon Awakening)"	3:21
34.	"M-8 Start (Temen-Ni-Gru Dive)"	2:25
35.	"Stage Music 4 (Within Leviathan)"	2:43
36.	"Gigapede Appearance Inside Leviathan"	1:43
37.	"Heart of Leviathan"	3:04
38.	"M-8 End (Suspicious Behavior)"	1:12

#	Title	Length
1.	"M-9 Start (Leviathan Falls)"	1:46
2.	"Stage Music 5 (Subterranean Lake)"	2:27
3.	"Nevan Appearance"	0:49
4.	"Nevan Battle"	3:28
5.	"Nevan Defeated - Thunder Blade Nevan"	0:47
6.	"M-9 End (Lady Surrounded by the 7 Hells"	0:36
7.	"M-10 Start (Betrayal)"	2:07
8.	"Eternal Mechanism Set (Dante Lifting)"	0:22
9.	"M-10 End (Lady's Past)"	2:00
10.	"M-11 Start (Arkham's Death)"	2:31
11.	"Stage Music 6 (Gears Room - Underground Arena)"	2:13
12.	"Beowulf Appearance"	0:38
13.	"Beowulf Battle"	2:58
14.	"Beowulf Defeated"	0:37
15.	"M-11 End (Vanished Arkham)"	0:11
16.	"M-12 Start (Jester Reveals the Mystery of Temen-Ni-Gru)"	1:10
17.	"Geryon Appearance"	0:24
18.	"Geryon Battle 1"	3:39
19.	"Bridge Lowered ~ Geryon Battle 2"	0:48
20.	"Geryon Defeated ~ Get Quicksilver Style!"	0:25
21.	"M-12 End (Vergil Defeats Beowulf)"	0:49
22.	"M-13 Start (Ritual)"	0:41
23.	"Reunion"	0:48
24.	"Vergil Battle 2"	5:30
25.	"M-13 End (Conspiracy)"	2:48
26.	"M-14 Start (Arkham Standing at the Top of Temen-Ni-Gru)"	1:16
27.	"The Two Who Chase Arkham"	1:04
28.	"Mission Start 2 (Mission Start 2)"	2:40
29.	"Stage Music 7 (Temen-Ni-Gru After the Ritual)"	4:02
30.	"Battle-2 (Battle Music 2)"	3:05
31.	"M-14 End (Bike Action)"	1:17
32.	"The Fallen Appearance - Battle"	0:32
33.	"Divinity Statue"	3:50
34.	"M-15 End (Arkham Goes to the Demon World)"	2:04
35.	"M-16 Start (The Path to the Demon World)"	0:16
36.	"Stage Music 8 (Temen-Ni-Gru United With the Demon World)"	2:08
37.	"Confrontation With Lady"	0:53
38.	"Lady Battle"	4:00
39.	"M-16 End (Confiding Lady)"	1:59

#	Title	Length
1.	"M-17 Start (Arkham Pulls Out Demon Sword Sparda)"	1:20
2.	"Doppelganger Appearance"	0:46
3.	"Doppelganger Battle"	2:00
4.	"Get Doppelganger Style!"	0:20
5.	"Stage Music 9 (Demon World)"	4:56
6.	"Damned Chess Battle"	3:36
7.	"M-18 End (Arkham's Awakening)"	0:54
8.	"Stage Music 10 (Neverending Void of Hades)"	2:29
9.	"Arkham Running Amok"	1:26
10.	"Arkham Battle"	3:07
11.	"Intrusion"	0:34
12.	"Arkham Battle 2"	4:46
13.	"M-19 End (Jackpot!)"	1:23
14.	"M-20 Start (Father-Daughter Conclusion)"	2:58
15.	"Sibling Showdown"	0:58
16.	"Vergil Battle 3"	6:52
17.	"M-20 End (Conclusion)"	2:27
18.	""Devils Never Cry" (Staff Roll)"	5:19
19.	"Epilogue"	1:10
20.	"Vergil Afterwards"	0:53
21.	"Total Result"	2:48
22.	"Game Over"	0:14
23.	"Super Play (Super Play Movie) [bonus track]"	1:24
24.	"Loop Demo Movie [bonus track]"	3:34
25.	"Motion Capture Movie [bonus track]"	3:22
26.	"Video Continuity [bonus track]"	3:05
27.	"Promotion Movie [bonus track]"	1:05

=== Devil May Cry: The Animated series ===
Devil May Cry: The Animated series Original soundtrack

Soundtrack album by Capcom
- Released: August 18, 2007
- Genre: Anime Soundtrack
- Length: 61:13
- Label: Miya Records
- Producer: Rungran

Professional ratings
Review scores
Source	Rating
Square Enix Music Online	8/10
CDJapan	5/5 stars

Released on August 18, 2007, in Japan by Rungran, which is a collective for all the composers who wrote for the anime, Devil May Cry. The composers consist of Aimee B, Gabriele Roberto, Giacomo Puccini, Hiroaki Tsutsumi, JETBIKINI, Kenji Fujii, Rin Oikawa, Shigekazu Aida, Suble and Takeshi Hama.

Track listing

#	Title	Performer/Composer	Length
1.	"D.M.C."	Takeshi Hama	1:43
2.	"Lynch's Mood"	Suble	2:10
3.	"Fight!"	Gabriele Roberto	2:09
4.	"Faint"	Suble	2:21
5.	"Room DESPAIR"	Aimee B	3:09
6.	"Life is on You"	Kenji Fujii & Suble	3:02
7.	"Dance"	Takeshi Hama & Hiroaki Tsutsumi	2:15
8.	"F.O.E."	Takeshi Hama	2:17
9.	"The Reaper"	JETBIKINI	2:58
10.	"Bullet"	Hiroaki Tsutsumi	1:25
11.	"Under the Sun"	Takeshi Hama	2:00
12.	"Fate Line"	Takeshi Hama	2:21
13.	"D.M.C. (Band Ver.)"	Takeshi Hama	1:37
14.	"Last Rag"	Takeshi Hama	1:32
15.	"Seidaku"	Suble	2:48
16.	"Blue Rose"	JETBIKINI	3:59
17.	"Future In My Hands"	Aimee B	3:59
18.	"Netherworld"	Gabriele Roberto	4:28
19.	"Pain"	Takeshi Hama	2:38
20.	"Evil Spirit"	Gabriele Roberto & Shigekazu Aida	1:43
21.	"Dante's Might"	Gabriele Roberto	1:45
22.	"Steep Slope"	Shigekazu Aida & Suble	2:00
23.	"D.M.C. (Gut Guitar Ver.)"	Takeshi Hama & Hiroaki Tsutsumi	1:44
24.	"Victory"	Gabriele Roberto & Giacomo Puccini	2:36
25.	"I'll Be Your Home"	Rin Oikawa	4:12

=== Devil May Cry 4 ===
Devil May Cry 4 Original Soundtrack

Soundtrack album by Capcom
- Released: February 27, 2008; USA on November 25, 2008
- Genre: Video Game Soundtrack
- Length: 221:56
- Label: Suleputer, Sumthing Else (25 Nov 2008)
- Producer: Tetsuya Shibata

Professional ratings
Review scores
Source	Rating
Square Enix Music	8/10
Amazon	5/5 stars

Devil May Cry 4 Original Soundtrack is a 3-disc, 104 track soundtrack to the video game Devil May Cry 4. It was released in Japan on February 27, 2008. Female vocals are handled by Aubrey Ashburn (1-02) while male vocals are handled by Shawn "Shootie HG" McPherson of Hostile Groove (1-20 and 3-03) and Jason "ShyBoy" Arnold of Hypnogaja (1-13 and 3-38). Tetsuya Shibata is credited as the primary composer, with tracks composed by Shusaku Uchiyama, Kota Suzuki, Akihiko Narita, Rei Kondoh, Chamy Ishikawa and Shinichiro Satoh. The soundtrack was released in the USA on 25 Nov 2008 with a new artwork.

Track listing

#	Japanese title	English translation	Length
1.	"タイトル画面"	"Devil May Cry 4 Title"	0:58
2.	"Out of Darkness (プロローグ)"	"Out Of Darkness (Prologue)"	3:13
3.	"Genocide (オープニング)"	"Genocide (Opening)"	4:53
4.	"ミッションスタート1"	"Mission Start 1"	1:59
5.	"赤の男 -銃と剣とで-"	"The Man in Red -Guns and Swords-"	0:38
6.	"Blackened Angel (ダンテ戦闘1)"	"Blackened Angel (Dante Battle 1)"	4:59
7.	"赤の男 -悪魔の右腕-"	"The Man in Red -The Devil's Right Arm-"	1:16
8.	"赤の男 -似た者同士-"	"The Man in Red -Birds of a Feather-"	1:09
9.	"赤の男 -“謎を残して-"	"The Man in Red -Remaining Mysteries-"	1:56
10.	"ミッションクリア"	"Mission Clear"	1:08
11.	"The Hell Gate -悪魔襲来-"	"The Hell Gate -Demon Invasion-"	3:12
12.	"StageI (オペラハウス前)"	"Stage I (In front of the Opera House)"	1:45
13.	"The Time Has Come (ネロ汎用戦闘)"	"The Time Has Come (Nero's Battle Theme)"	3:51
14.	"StageII (屋内～倉庫)"	"Stage II (Warehouse)"	1:36
15.	"StageIII (屋外～市街1)"	"Stage III (Town 1)"	2:14
16.	"StageIV (教会)"	"Stage IV (Church)"	3:01
17.	"The idol of the "Time and Space" (時空神像)"	"The idol of the "Time and Space""	3:47
18.	"StageV (洞窟)"	"Stage V (Caves)"	2:27
19.	"ベリアル登場"	"Berial Appearance"	1:41
20.	"Sworn Through Swords (ベリアル戦闘)"	"Sworn Through Swords (Berial Battle)"	3:16
21.	"ゲームオーバー"	"Game Over"	1:10
22.	"ベリアル撤退"	"Berial's Retreat"	0:26
23.	"StageVI (雪山)"	"Stage VI (Snowy Mountains)"	1:26
24.	"妖艶のグロリア"	"The Voluptuous Gloria"	2:50
25.	"StageVII (フォルトゥナ城)"	"Stage VII (Fortuna Castle)"	3:03
26.	"Baroque and Beats (ビアンコアンジェロ戦闘)"	"Baroque And Beats (Bianco Angelo Battle)"	5:20
27.	"ビアンコアンジェロ崩壊"	"Bianco Angelo Disassembled"	0:30
28.	"シークレットミッション"	"Secret Mission"	1:25
29.	"吹雪のダンス"	"Dance in the Blizzard"	0:39
30.	"Temptation (バエル触手戦闘)"	"Temptation (Bael Tentacle Battle)"	4:34
31.	"バエル登場"	"Bael Appearance"	0:30
32.	"Frozen Frog (バエル戦闘)"	"Frozen Frog (Bael Battle)"	3:19
33.	"バエル倒す"	"Bael Defeated"	1:05

#	Japanese title	English translation	Length
1.	"王の帰還"	"The Return of the King"	2:19
2.	"StageVIII (地下研究施設)"	"Stage VIII (Underground Research Facility)"	2:04
3.	"閻魔刀1"	"Sword of the Devil 1"	2:00
4.	"Irregularity Attacks (アグナス戦闘)"	"Irregularity Attacks (Agnus Battle)"	3:57
5.	"閻魔刀2 -awaken-"	"Sword of the Devil 2 -Awaken-"	5:41
6.	"To The Forest (森へ)"	"To The Forest"	0:47
7.	"陰謀"	"Conspiracy"	2:27
8.	"StageIX (ミティスの森)"	"Stage IX (Mitis Forest)"	2:12
9.	"キメラシード登場～戦闘"	"Chimera Seed Appearance ~ Battle"	0:35
10.	"Imminence (樹海の龍)"	"Imminence (Serpent of the Forest)"	1:13
11.	"エキドナ登場"	"Echidna Appearance"	1:10
12.	"The Viper (エキドナ戦闘)"	"The Viper (Echidna Battle)"	5:07
13.	"エキドナ撤退"	"Echidna's Retreat"	0:35
14.	"アサルト登場～戦闘"	"Assault Appearance ~ Battle"	0:30
15.	"StageX (迷いの森)"	"Stage X (Lost Forest)"	4:06
16.	"忠節のクレド"	"The Loyal Credo"	1:29
17.	"Swipe of Sword (クレド戦闘)"	"Swipe of Sword (Credo Battle)"	4:01
18.	"クレド倒す～受難のキリエ"	"Credo Defeated ~ Kyrie's Suffering"	2:43
19.	"アルトアンジェロ登場～戦闘"	"Alto Angelo Appearance ~ Battle"	1:10
20.	"StageXI (教団本部)"	"Stage XI (Order of the Sword Headquarters)"	2:29
21.	"アグナス再び"	"Agnus Revisited"	0:30
22.	"Science will never die (アンジェロアグナス戦闘)"	"Science Will Never Die (Angelo Agnus Battle)"	4:19
23.	"届かぬその手"	"Just Out Of Reach"	2:00
24.	"ファウスト登場～戦闘"	"Faust Appearance ~ Battle"	0:53
25.	"ダンテ推参"	"Dante's Party Crashing"	1:10
26.	"Forza del Destino (ダンテ戦闘2)"	"Forza del Destino (Dante Battle 2)"	3:59
27.	"The Dying Wish (家族の遺志を)"	"The Dying Wish (Family Legacy)"	2:33
28.	"StageXII (神建造現場)"	"Stage XII (Savior Construction Site)"	2:03
29.	"教皇との対峙1"	"Confrontation with His Holiness"	1:39
30.	"Chorus in the Darkness (教皇戦闘1)"	"Chorus In The Darkness (Sanctus Battle 1)"	3:57
31.	"終幕"	"The Final Act"	3:22

#	Japanese title	English translation	Length
1.	"Nero and Kyrie (胎内)"	"Nero And Kyrie (In The Womb)"	1:22
2.	"神起動～誇り高き死"	"God Rises ~ Death with High Pride"	3:01
3.	"Lock and Load -Blackened Angel mix- (ダンテ汎用戦闘)"	"Lock and Load -Blackened Angel mix- (Dante's Battle Theme)"	4:34
4.	"開闢"	"The Gate Is Opened"	2:46
5.	"ミッションスタート2"	"Mission Start 2"	1:30
6.	"メガ・スケアクロウ登場～戦闘"	"Mega Scarecrows Appearance ~ Battle"	0:36
7.	"Time Attack (教団本部脱出)"	"Time Attack (Escape Headquarters)"	1:42
8.	"教団本部破壊"	"The Collapse of Headquarters"	0:22
9.	"The Beginning -レディの依頼-"	"The Beginning -Lady's Request-"	1:41
10.	"エキドナ再び～戦闘"	"Echidna, Again ~ Battle"	1:33
11.	"エキドナ倒す～衝撃鋼ギルガメス"	"Echidna Defeated ~ Shocking Steel, Gilgamesh"	1:03
12.	"ダゴン登場～戦闘"	"Dagon Appearance ~ Battle"	1:29
13.	"ダゴン倒す～災厄兵器パンドラ"	"Dagon Defeated ~ Calamitous Ordinance, Pandora"	1:47
14.	"バジリスク登場～戦闘"	"Basilisk Appearance ~ Battle"	0:39
15.	"ベリアル再び～戦闘"	"Berial, Again ~ Battle"	0:59
16.	"ベリアル倒す～無尽剣ルシフェル"	"Berial Defeated ~ Inexhaustible Swords, Lucifer"	1:43
17.	"StageXIII (屋外～市街2)"	"Stage XIII (Town 2)"	2:09
18.	"アグナス三度1～戦闘"	"Agnus Redux 1 ~ Battle"	2:26
19.	"アグナス三度2 -And the rest is silence-"	"Agnus Redux 2 -And the rest is silence-"	1:23
20.	"閻魔刀奪回"	"The Return of Yamato"	0:34
21.	"地獄門破壊"	"Destruction of the Hell Gate"	0:44
22.	"神を見下ろす者"	"The One Looking Down on God"	1:37
23.	"Power of Destroyer (神戦闘1)"	"Power Of Destroyer (Savior Battle 1)"	4:27
24.	"神の力"	"Divine Power"	0:25
25.	"Power of Destroyer -Limit Break mix- (神戦闘2)"	"Power Of Destroyer -Limit Break Mix- (Savior Battle 2)"	4:25
26.	"この声よ届け"	"The Penetrating Voice"	1:49
27.	"Send in the New Star (主役交代)"	"Send In The New Star (Alternating Protagonists)"	0:54
28.	"試練の階段へ"	"To the Stairs of Trial"	0:20
29.	"StageXIV (神内部)"	"Stage XIV (Savior Internal)"	2:45
30.	"The Recital (競演)"	"The Recital (Play Opposite)"	0:30
31.	"教皇との対峙2"	"Confrontation with Sanctus"	1:35
32.	"The Vicious Flames (教皇戦闘2)"	"The Vicious Flames (Sanctus Battle 2)"	4:06
33.	"スパーダの遺志～キリエ救出"	"Sparda's Will ~ Kyrie's Deliverance"	1:43
34.	"最後の戦いへ"	"To the Last Battle"	1:30
35.	"The Last Blow (神最終戦闘)"	"The Last Blow (False Savior Battle)"	2:14
36.	"The Real Reason -この右腕はそのために-"	"The Real Reason -What This Right Arm is For-"	0:57
37.	"La Vita Nuova -新生-"	"La Vita Nuova -A New Life-"	2:47
38.	"Shall Never Surrender (スタッフロール)"	"Shall Never Surrender (Staff Roll)"	4:58
39.	"Standard Daytime -日常-"	"Standard Daytime -Just Another Day-"	1:52
40.	"トータルリザルト"	"Total Result"	1:20

=== DmC: Devil May Cry ===
DmC: Devil May Cry soundtrack

Soundtrack album by Noisia and Combichrist
- Released: January 15, 2013
- Genre: Electronic, drum and bass, industrial metal, EBM
- Length: 55:43
- Label: Capcom
- Producer: Noisia and Andy LaPlegua

DmC: Devil May Cry Soundtrack Selection is the soundtrack to the game DmC: Devil May Cry. It was released on 15 January 2013, coinciding with the game's release date. The soundtrack selection is not available for commercial sale, it was instead a European bonus that came with pre-ordered Premium/Special editions. The tracks are composed by Noisia and Andy LaPlegua and performed by Noisia (1-7) and Combichrist (8-15).

Both bands have released their own editions: No Redemption by Combichrist and DmC: Devil May Cry Soundtrack by Noisia.

Track listing

#	Title	Performer/Composer	Length
1.	"Bob Barbas Fight"	Noisia	5:41
2.	"Devil's Dalliance"	Noisia	5:37
3.	"Hunter"	Noisia	4:45
4.	"Lilith Fight"	Noisia	2:41
5.	"Mundus Fight"	Noisia	4:37
6.	"Succubus Fight"	Noisia	2:25
7.	"The Trade"	Noisia	1:34
8.	"Sequential One"	Combichrist	4:54
9.	"Clouds of War	Combichrist	4:09
10.	"No Redemption	Combichrist	3:00
11.	"Media Riot"	Combichrist	2:40
12.	"Pull the Pin	Combichrist	3:21
13.	"How Old Is Your Soul?"	Combichrist	3:21
14.	"Zombie Fistfight"	Combichrist	3:31
15.	"Buried Alive"	Combichrist	3:38
16.	"Empty"	Combichrist	4:32

== Special soundtrack ==
=== Devil May Cry: Dangerous hits ===
Devil May Cry: Dangerous hits

Soundtrack album by Capcom
- Released: September 27, 2006
- Genre: Video Game Soundtrack
- Label: Suleputer

Professional ratings
Review scores
Source	Rating
VGMdb	4/5 stars

Track listing

#	Title	Length
1.	The Theme Of Sparda - Devil Sunday (Sparda's Theme)	1:00
2.	Pubic Enemy (Generic Battle 1)	2:51
3.	Statue of Time	2:58
4.	Red-Hot Juice (Phantom Battle)	2:09
5.	Flock Off! (Griffon Battle)	2:44
6.	Lock & Load Original (Generic Battle 2)	2:54
7.	The Theme Of Eva (Eva's Theme)	1:20
8.	Legendary Battle (Demon Emperor Moundou Battle 1 Sky)	4:43
9.	Dante & Trish Seeds Of Love	4:03
10.	Dance With Devils	1:35
11.	Shoot The Works (Dante Battle 2)	2:47
12.	Wings Of The Guardian (Lucia Battle 1)	2:17
13.	Realize, Regret ... Resolution	1:54
14.	Sacred Tears	1:32
15.	Ragnarok (The Despair Embodied Battle)	3:50
16.	Heads Or Tails (Staffroll)	3:51
17.	Dante's Office 7 Hells Battle	2:11
18.	Battle2 (Generic Battle 2)	3:06
19.	Beowulf Battle	3:37
20.	Vergil Appearance Vergil Battle 1	3:49
21.	Reunion Vergil Battle 2	6:19
22.	Sibling Showdown Vergil Battle 3	7:51
23.	Conclusion	2:28
24.	Devils Never Cry	5:20

#	Title	Length
1.	Vergil Generic Battle 1	3:54
2.	Jester Battle	3:49
3.	Devils Never Cry Remix	5:02

=== Devil May Cry 4: Special ===
Devil May Cry 4 Special Soundtrack

Soundtrack album by Capcom
- Released: December 19, 2007
- Genre: Video Game Soundtrack
- Length: 54:59
- Label: Avex Trax
- Producer: Tetsuya Shibata

Professional ratings
Review scores
Source	Rating
Square Enix Music	7/10

Released on December 19, 2007, in Japan, it comes with a CD with selected tracks from the game as well as a DVD with promotional videos. Female vocals are handled by Aubrey Ashburn ("Out of Darkness (Prologue)") while male vocals are handled by Shawn "Shootie HG" McPherson of Hostile Groove ("Sworn Through Swords" and "Lock and Load (Blackened Angel mix)") and Jason "ShyBoy" Arnold of Hypnogaja ("The Time Has Come" and "Shall Never Surrender (End Roll)").

Track listing

#	Title	Length
1.	"Out of Darkness (Prologue)"	3:12
2.	"The Time Has Come"	3:51
3.	"The Hell Gate"	3:51
4.	"Stage I"	3:00
5.	"Sworn Through Swords"	3:16
6.	"Stage II"	3:01
7.	"Temptation"	3:13
8.	"Awaken"	5:35
9.	"The Viper"	4:06
10.	"The Idol of the "Time and Space""	3:45
11.	"Swipe of Sword"	4:17
12.	"Stage III"	2:27
13.	"Lock and Load (Blackened Angel mix)"	5:06
14.	"The Gate is Opened"	2:45
15.	"Shall Never Surrender (End Roll)"	4:52
