= Get Out of My Head =

Get Out of My Head may refer to:

== Entertainment ==
- "Get Out of My Head!", a 2001 episode of The Grim Adventures of Billy & Mandy

=== Songs ===
- "Get Out of My Head", by Combichrist from their 2009 album Today We Are All Demons
- "Get Out of My Head", by Cypress Hill from their 2000 album Skull & Bones
- "Get Out of My Head", by Firewater from their 2001 album Psychopharmacology
- "Get Out of My Head", by Four Year Strong from their 2020 album Brain Pain
- "Get Out of My Head", by Heavens to Betsy
- "Get Out of My Head", by Lil Wayne from his 2020 album Funeral
- "Get Out of My Head", by MDFMK from their 2000 album MDFMK
- "Get Out of My Head", by Status Quo from their 2019 album Backbone
- "Get Out of My Head", by Bonnie Tyler from her 1981 album Goodbye to the Island

== See also ==
- Get Out My Head (disambiguation)
