= What the Fuck Is Wrong with You People? =

2007 album by Combichrist

Studio album by Combichrist
- Released: March 6, 2007
- Genre: Aggrotech
- Length: 72:43
- Label: Out of Line/Metropolis

Combichrist chronology
Everybody Hates You (2005)	What the Fuck Is Wrong with You People? (2007)	Today We Are All Demons (2009)

Singles from What the Fuck is Wrong With You People?
- 1. "Get Your Body Beat" Released: June 2, 2006; 2. "Electrohead" Released: June 10, 2007; 3. "Deathbed" Released: May 7, 2007; 4. "Fuck That Shit" Released: 2007

What the Fuck Is Wrong with You People? is an album by the American aggrotech band Combichrist, which includes the single "Get Your Body Beat." The 2-CD digipack edition includes a bonus disc with specific loop tracks in a similar pattern, going one by one without breaks. LaPlegua promoted the release of this album with a three-legged world tour. The album was announced in January 2007 and was meant to showcase the band's self-created style of "Techno Body Music." The main single from the album, Get Your Body Beat, appeared on the Billboard charts for six weeks.

== Track listing ==
All tracks are written by Andy LaPlegua.

Disc one
No.	Title	Length
1.	"5 AM Afterparty"	0:55
2.	"What the Fuck Is Wrong with You?"	5:00
3.	"Electrohead"	6:00
4.	"Adult Content"	5:51
5.	"Fuck That Shit"	5:51
6.	"Brain Bypass"	8:30
7.	"Get Your Body Beat"	4:49
8.	"Deathbed"	5:59
9.	"In the Pit"	4:38
10.	"Shut Up and Swallow"	5:46
11.	"Red"	4:18
12.	"Are You Connected"	5:39
13.	"Give Head if You Got It"	4:43
14.	"All Your Bass Belongs to Us"	4:44

Disc two
No.	Title	Length
1.	"God Warrior"	4:50
2.	"Dead Again"	4:37
3.	"Verdammt"	6:15
4.	"AM"	3:24
5.	"Dawn of Man"	5:44
6.	"Jack Torrance"	4:15
7.	"Another Corpse Under My Bed"	5:28
8.	"Body: Part"	5:27
9.	"HAL 9000"	5:42
10.	"Shut Up and Bleed" (feat. Waste)	4:45

== Reception ==
Professional ratings
Review scores
Source	Rating
Scene Point Blank	4/5 stars
amodelofcontrol.com	7/10 stars
Release Magazine	8/10 stars
DARKSIDE	7/10 stars

The album received mostly positive reviews, with Inside Pulse stating that "The standout tracks really show the growth. Yet as a whole the album still leaves room for growth." French music magazine VerdamMnis Magazine reviewed the album positively, stating that "The album keeps us hooked, perfectly crafted to stick in your head and make you want to move." Online magazine Blogcritics stated that it was "the bands best work to date."
