= We Love You (disambiguation) =

"We Love You" is a song by the Rolling Stones.

We Love You may also refer to:

- "We Love You", a song by Avenged Sevenfold from Life Is But a Dream...
- "We Love You" (Orchestral Manoeuvres in the Dark song), a 1986 song by Orchestral Manoeuvres in the Dark
- "We Love You", a song by The Psychedelic Furs from their self-titled album
- We Love You (Semi Precious Weapons album), 2008
- We Love You, Wall of Sound sub-label
- We Love You (Combichrist album), 2014
