= Get Out My Head =

Get Out My Head can refer to:

- "Get Out My Head" (Redlight song) (2012)
- "Get Out My Head" (Shane Codd song) (2019)

== See also ==
- Get Out of My Head (disambiguation)
