= Tribal Machine =

- Origin: Victoria, British Columbia, Canada
- Genres: Rock
- Years active: 1999–present
- Labels: Lamima Dereves
- Members: Sever Bronny; Brian Hartlen; Brad Wutke; Dustin Flemming
- Website: TribalMachine.com

Tribal Machine is an industrial rock band from Victoria, British Columbia, led by musician and author Sever Bronny.

== History ==
Bronny formed the industrial-rock band Tribal Machine in the late 1990s, in London, Ontario working alone with drum machines, synthesizers, guitars and early digital work stations. Bronny later moved to Victoria, British Columbia where Tribal Machine was developed into a full band by the addition of Brian Hartlen (Metatron) on guitar, Brad Wutke (Buyproduct) on bass, and Dustin Flemming on drums.

Bronny designed the Tribal Machine releases as chapters in a larger story. The first chapter, The Awakening of the Animal, was released in late 2002 in a limited edition. The second chapter, Soldiers in a War of the Mind, was released in 2006. Its tracks included "Black Fly" and "Sand of History," the latter being featured in the 2008 biopunk movie The Gene Generation alongside industrial acts Combichrist and VNV Nation.

The third chapter, The Orwellian Night, is a 16-song concept album based on the ideas of the author George Orwell, and broken into four acts. The album tells the story of regular people living in a dystopian future where Big Government has been replaced by Big Business, and where people are forced to pledge allegiance to The Corporation. The album was mastered by Tom Baker and released on CD through the band's website in May 2010, followed shortly by a release on iTunes, Rhapsody, and other digital distribution sources.

== Albums ==
- The Awakening of the Animal (2002)
- Soldiers in a War of the Mind (2006)
- The Orwellian Night (2010)

== Members ==
- Sever Bronny (vocals)
- Brian Hartlen (guitar)
- Brad Wutke (bass)
- Dustin Flemming (drums)
