= Panzer AG =

- Origin: United States
- Genres: Aggrotech, industrial rock
- Years active: 2004 – present
- Labels: Metropolis (North America); Accession Records (Europe)
- Members: Andy LaPlegua- Vocals, Guitar; Jon Horton- Drums; Lauren Krothe- Keyboards

Panzer AG is the name of an aggrotech/industrial rock side-project by Norwegian Andy LaPlegua, the founder of futurepop band Icon of Coil. Formed in 2004, Panzer AG's sound combines Power noise, Industrial, Trance, Rock and other genres to create a caustic but danceable form of music.

== History ==
After experimenting with a variety of music styles, such as Futurepop with Icon of Coil, as well as aggrotech, power noise and industrial with Combichrist, LaPlegua furthered his sound by increasing the aggressiveness of both his lyrical content and his music. As well, where Icon Of Coil is purely Electronica, and Combichrist dabbles a tad with Industrial Rock, Panzer AG combines elements of industrial music, Trance Music and Hard rock. The result was the full-length album, This Is My Battlefield on the Metropolis Records label.

With the success of This Is My Battlefield, Panzer AG began working on a follow-up album, which was entitled Your World Is Burning, which was released in 2006. A slight departure in style from This Is My Battlefield, it is said to have been "incorporating more of a 'Pretty Hate Machine era' industrial rock feel." The album peaked at #2 on the German Alternative Charts (DAC) and ranked #23 on the DAC Top Albums of 2006.

== Discography ==
- This Is My Battlefield – Metropolis Records 2004
- Your World Is Burning – Metropolis Records 2006

== See also ==
- Andy LaPlegua
- Combichrist
- Icon of Coil
