= Get Your Body Beat =

EP by Combichrist
- Released: June 2, 2006
- Genre: Aggrotech
- Label: Out of Line

Combichrist chronology
Everybody Hates You (2005)	Get Your Body Beat (2006)	What the Fuck Is Wrong with You People? (2007)

Professional ratings
Review scores
Source	Rating
AllMusic	3/5 stars

Get Your Body Beat is an EP by the aggrotech band Combichrist. It is considered to be the band's break-out single. The video for the song shows scenes of Combichrist playing as well as scenes from The Gene Generation movie. The intro from the ambient track "DNA AM" can also be heard at the start of the video.

The single track appeared on Billboard's Top 10 Dance Singles chart and peaked at #1 on the German Alternative Chart (DAC), ranking #16 on the DAC Top Singles of 2006.

== Track listing ==
No.	Title	Length
1.	"Get Your Body Beat" (Album Version)	4:35
2.	"Products" (Life Composer Version)	5:13
3.	"What the Fcuk"	5:53
4.	"Get Your Body Beat" (KMFDM remix)	4:11
5.	"Get Your Body Beat" (Amduscia remix)	4:45
6.	"Get Your Body Beat" (Spetsnaz remix)	3:30
7.	"Get Your Body Beat" (Point45 remix)	4:55
8.	"Get Your Body Beat" (Manufactura remix)	5:31
9.	"Get Your Body Beat" (Sergio Mesa remix)	7:03
10.	"DNA AM"	7:10
