= Noise Collection Vol. 1 =

Studio album by Combichrist
- Released: July 13, 2010
- Genres: Aggrotech, power noise
- Length: 2:10:56
- Label: Metropolis Records

Combichrist chronology
Today We Are All Demons (2009)	Noise Collection Vol. 1 (2010)	Making Monsters (2010)

Noise Collection Vol. 1 is a compilation album by American aggrotech / industrial metal band Combichrist. The first disc is their album The Joy of Gunz, and the second disc collects their first three EPs: Kiss the Blade, Blut Royale and Sex, Drogen und Industrial.

== Track listing ==
Disc One
No.	Title	Length
1.	"Intruder Alert"	3:41
2.	"Joy to the World"	4:18
3.	"You Will Be the Bitch Now"	3:25
4.	"Winteryear"	3:36
5.	"Play Dead"	4:07
6.	"Turmoil"	2:54
7.	"Master Control"	3:45
8.	"Vater Unser"	4:27
9.	"The Line of the Dead"	4:57
10.	"Bulletfuck"	3:32
11.	"Human Error"	2:50
12.	"God Wrapped in Plastic"	3:56
13.	"History of Maddness"	4:49
14.	"Shrunken Heads For All Occasions"	7:05

Disc Two
No.	Title	Length
1.	"Kiss the Blade (Motherfucker 667 Mix)"	3:52
2.	"Kiss the Blade (Frequensy Cabrone 667 Mix)"	3:42
3.	"Minus One"	3:17
4.	"The Well"	6:13
5.	"Penalty Shot"	4:25
6.	"Blut Royale (Instru-Mental Version)"	5:36
7.	"Tractor"	5:07
8.	"Anatomy"	5:10
9.	"Sex Drogen Und Industri (LowTech Mix)"	5:24
10.	"Sex Drogen Und Industri (Remixed by Soman)"	5:04
11.	"Sex Drogen Und Industri (Unknown Mix)"	4:56
12.	"Vater Unser (Combicritter Remix)"	4:51
13.	"Like to Thank My Buddies (Live at Infest)"	6:20
14.	"Strike"	5:32
15.	"This is the Joy of Gunz"	4:07
