= Making Monsters (album) =

2010 Combichrist album

Studio album by Combichrist
- Released: 27 August 2010 (Europe); 28 September 2010 (America)
- Genre: Aggrotech, futurepop
- Length: 56:48
- Label: Out of Line/Metropolis Records

Combichrist chronology
| Noise Collection Vol. 1 (2010) | Making Monsters (2010) | No Redemption (2013) |

Singles from Making Monsters
- 1. "Never Surrender" Released: August 6, 2010; 2. "Throat Full of Glass" Released: March 4, 2011

Professional ratings
Review scores
| Source | Rating |
|---|---|
| COMA Music Magazine | (Favorable) |
| Brutal Resonance | 8/10 stars |

Making Monsters is the fifth studio album by the American aggrotech band Combichrist. The album was released on CD, CD/DVD, double album, and digital download.

== CD track listing ==
All songs written by Andy LaPlegua.

| No. | Title | Length |
|---|---|---|
| 1. | "Declamation" | 1:55 |
| 2. | "Follow the Trail of Blood" (feat. Brandan Schieppati of Bleeding Through) | 5:17 |
| 3. | "Never Surrender" | 4:49 |
| 4. | "Throat Full of Glass" | 4:47 |
| 5. | "Fuckmachine" | 5:15 |
| 6. | "Forgotten" | 4:09 |
| 7. | "Just Like Me" | 5:10 |
| 8. | "Slave to Machine" | 4:25 |
| 9. | "Through These Eyes of Pain" | 4:13 |
| 10. | "Monster:Murder:Kill" | 5:49 |
| 11. | "They" | 6:21 |
| 12. | "Reclamation" | 4:32 |

== DVD track listing (Digipak edition) ==
| No. | Title | Length |
|---|---|---|
| 1. | "Electrohead" (Live in Russia) | 5:51 |
| 2. | "Get Out of My Head" (Live in Russia) | 4:39 |
| 3. | "Without Emotions" (Live in Russia) | 4:52 |
| 4. | "Scarred" (Live in Germany) | 4:47 |
| 5. | "I Want Your Blood" (Live in Germany) | 5:41 |

== Charts ==
| Chart (2010) | Peak position |
|---|---|
| German Newcomer Chart | 7 |

== Reception ==
The album was received positively, with some reviewers comparing the sound to Andy LaPlegua's previous band, Icon of Coil.
