= Eric13 =

Eric 13
- Genres: Electro-industrial, heavy metal, industrial metal, industrial rock, rock-n-roll;rock;hard rock, acoustic
- Instrument(s): Guitar, acoustic guitar, tambourine, skinflute, harmonica, vocals,
- Website: www.eric13.com

Eric13 (born November 18) is an American rock musician from Philadelphia, PA. He was the founder, singer and guitarist for Sex Slaves, a loud, daring and unadulterated rock band from New York City. He has since recorded and toured with the industrial band Combichrist, and released two solo acoustic rock 'n' roll albums. Ever evolving as a solo artist, the new single Devil's Highway marks the beginning of a new era with darker and more introspective songs, juxtaposing his current involvement with Combichrist.

== Discography ==
- SEX SLAVES : NIKKI (Germ Music, 2003)
- SEX SLAVES : PUL THE TRIGGER, LIVE (Germ Music, 2003)
- SEX SLAVES : BITE YOUR TONGUE (Radical Records, 2005)
- SEX SLAVES : WASTED ANGEL (Loch Ness Records, 2009)
- ERIC13 :RITUAL DANCE (Loch Ness Records, 2010)
- SEX SLAVES : THE EARLY RECORDINGS (Radical Records, 2011)
- SEX SLAVES : CALL OF THE WILD (Loch Ness Records, 2012)
- ERIC13 & JOHNNY RICHIE : WHITE ALBUM (Loch Ness Records, 2013)
- Combichrist : THIS IS WHERE DEATH BEGINS (Out of Line, 2016)
