= Throat Full of Glass =

EP by Combichrist
- Released: 2011
- Genre: Aggrotech, electroclash, electropop
- Label: Out of Line

Combichrist chronology
Making Monsters (2010)	Throat Full of Glass (2011)	No Redemption (2013)

Throat Full of Glass is an EP by aggrotech band Combichrist. It is the second track to be released from the 2010 album Making Monsters.

== Track listing ==
No.	Title	Length
1.	"Throat Full of Glass" (Single Edit)	4:43
2.	"Throat Full of Glass" (S.A.M. Tough Guy Mix)	3:51
3.	"Throat Full of Glass" (Computer Club Vocal Mix)	4:30
4.	"Throat Full of Glass" (Computer Club Dub Mix)	4:30
5.	"Throat Full of Glass" (Northborne Remix)	5:34
6.	"Industrial Strength" (Instro Mental Mix)	4:54
7.	"Throat Full of Glass" (Music Video)	5:06

== Music video ==
On 14 February with the release of the "Throat Full of Glass" single, the video was also released. The American copy of the single has the "Clean" version of the video. The European copy contains the 'Dirty' version depicting mild nudity and graphic violence.
