= The Gene Generation =

- Theatrical release poster
- Directed by: Pearry Reginald Teo
- Written by: Keith Collea; Pearry Reginald Teo
- Produced by: Keith Collea
- Starring: Bai Ling; Parry Shen; Alec Newman; Michael Shamus Wiles; Faye Dunaway; Robert David Hall; Rebecca Parisi
- Cinematography: Anthony G. Nakonechnyj
- Edited by: Carmelo Casalenuovo
- Music by: Scott Glasgow; Ronan Harris
- Distributed by: Lionsgate
- Release dates: September 27, 2007 (American Film Institute); June 5, 2008 (United States)
- Running time: 96 minutes
- Country: United States
- Language: English

The Gene Generation is a 2007 biopunk science fiction action film about an assassin who battles DNA hackers. The film was directed by Pearry Reginald Teo, and stars Bai Ling, Parry Shen, Faye Dunaway, and Alec Newman.

== Synopsis ==
An assassin named Michelle battles DNA Hackers. Her younger brother Jackie becomes involved in a robbery, propelling him into DNA Hacking and crime. As the siblings face multiple challenges, including gunfights, they must navigate their way through a difficult world.

The film focuses on issues of morality, especially those linked to urban decay, and desperation.

== Cast ==
- Bai Ling – Michelle
- Parry Shen – Jackie
- Alec Newman – Christian
- Michael Shamus Wiles – Solemn
- Faye Dunaway – Josephine Hayden
- Robert David Hall – Abraham
- Rebecca Parisi – Julianne
- Tom Choi – Dad

== Visual effects ==
- Shero Rauf – 3D lead artist
- Dobri Georgiev – lead CGI artist
- Milen Jeliazkov – 2D lead artist

== DVD release ==
It was released on Region 1 DVD on January 27, 2009, with the Region 2 release following on April 27, 2009.

== Soundtrack and score ==
The soundtrack for the film features various tracks by Combichrist, Encephalon and Tribal Machine, while the score was composed by Scott Glasgow with additional music by Ronan Harris of VNV Nation. The score was released on CD by the Varèse Sarabande label in March 2009.

The following tracks are listed at the end of the film:

Song title	Writer	Performer	Published by	Courtesy of
Get Your Body Beat		Combichrist	Andy LaPlegua	Out of Line Music
Sand of History	Sever Bronny	Tribal Machine	Lamina Dereves Productions	
This Shit Will Fuck You Up		Combichrist	Andy LaPlegua	Out of Line Music
Demeter	Ronan Harris	Ronan Harris	AMV Talpa	
What The Fuck is Wrong With You		Combichrist	Andy LaPlegua	Out of Line Music
Electro Head		Combichrist	Andy LaPlegua	Out of Line Music
Rise	Matt Gifford, Sam Mainier	Encephalon	Urban Morphology (BMI)	Hive Records
Hate	Keith Arem	Contagion	Virtual Audio Publishing	PCB Productions

== Sequel ==
On February 4, 2010, it was revealed that a sequel, The Gene Generation: War of the Bloodlines, was in development. Filming was due to begin in March 2010 and be completed by September 2010. However, since this announcement there have been no further details on the status of the production.
