= We Love You (Combichrist album) =

Studio album by Combichrist
- Released: March 24, 2014
- Genre: Aggrotech, industrial metal
- Length: 55:52 (Standard); 90:18 (Deluxe)
- Label: Out of Line/Metropolis Records

Combichrist chronology
No Redemption (2013)	We Love You (2014)	This Is Where Death Begins (2016)

We Love You is the seventh studio album by the American electro-industrial band Combichrist. The album was released on 24 March 2014, and includes the singles "From My Cold Dead Hands" and "Maggots at the Party".

A video for "Maggots at the Party" was released to YouTube on April 1, 2014.

== Reception ==
Professional ratings
Review scores
Source	Rating
Revolver	4/5

The Revolver magazine's reviewer wrote that Combichrist's music should rather be labelled "Electronic Death Metal than Electronic Dance Music" and observed a "nihilistic" attitude. According to the Sonic Seducer, the album is a return to Combichrist's original electronic style. The song "Denial" was interpreted as a homage to Nine Inch Nails while "The Evil In Me" was seen as a reference to Johnny Cash.

We Love You peaked at #39 in the German Media Control Charts.

== Track listing ==
All songs written by Andy LaPlegua.

Standard version
No.	Title	Length
1.	"We Were Made to Love You"	3:50
2.	"Every Day Is War"	3:57
3.	"Can't Control"	4:10
4.	"Satan's Propaganda"	2:41
5.	"Maggots At The Party"	4:12
6.	"Denial"	3:49
7.	"The Evil In Me"	4:03
8.	"Fuck Unicorns"	3:05
9.	"Love Is A Razorblade"	3:20
10.	"From My Cold Dead Hands"	4:18
11.	"We Rule The World Motherfuckers"	4:54
12.	"Retreat Hell Part 1"	4:37
13.	"Retreat Hell Part 2"	8:49

Deluxe version - "The Art of Riots"
No.	Title	Length
14.	"The Plan"	7:00
15.	"Confrontation"	6:37
16.	"Skull Breaker"	7:11
17.	"Riot Station"	4:44
18.	"Norwega"	3:37
19.	"The King Has Spoken"	5:11
