= This Is My Battlefield =

Studio album by Panzer AG
- Released: June 14, 2004
- Genre: Power noise, aggrotech
- Length: 69:07
- Label: Accession Records (Europe), Metropolis Records (USA)

Panzer AG chronology
This Is My Battlefield (2004)	Your World Is Burning (2006)

This Is My Battlefield is a 2004 album by the Norwegian industrial music project Panzer AG.

== Track listing ==
1. “Introduction Of The Damned” – 1:41
2. “Filth God” – 4:45
3. “Battlefield” – 5:00
4. “Chemical Breed” – 4:05
5. “When Death Embrace Me” – 4:43
6. “Bereit” (vocals: Aleksandra Skrzypczak) – 3:53
7. “Totale Luftherrschaft” – 3:46
8. “Sick Is The One Who Adores Me” – 5:27
9. “Panzer” – 4:21
10. “Tides That Kill” (Panzer AG vs. Symbiont; Collaboration: Symbiont; lyrics: Symbiont) – 5:24
11. “God Eats God” – 4:11
12. “It Is All In Your Head” – 4:37
13. “Behind A Gasmask” – 4:08
14. “Pure Tension” – 4:21
15. “Drukne I Taarer” – 6:54

== Trivia ==
- The track "Battlefield" contains two samples from the movie Day of the Dead repeated throughout the song. It also features a sample of "Dracula -The Beginning" by Wojciech Kilar from the movie Bram Stoker's Dracula
- The track "When Death Embrace Me" contains a sample from the movie The Usual Suspects
- The track "Sick Is The One Who Adores Me" contains a line from the movie Memento
- The track "Drukne I Taarer" contains samples from the movie Lost Souls
- The track "God Eats God" contains a sample from the movie Full Metal Jacket
