= The Grim Adventures of Billy & Mandy season 1 =

Season of American animated television series

The Grim Adventures of Billy & Mandy
- Season 1
- DVD cover
- No. of episodes: 13 (38 segments)

Release
- Original network: Cartoon Network
- Original release: August 24, 2001 – August 1, 2003

Season chronology
- Next → Season 2

The first season of the American animated television series The Grim Adventures of Billy & Mandy originally aired on Cartoon Network in the United States from August 24, 2001 to August 1, 2003. It consisted of 13 episodes, all of which were originally produced for Grim & Evil, and the first eight of which aired as part of Grim & Evil in both the U.S. (except for "Battle of the Bands") and UK. The latter five and "Battle of the Bands" aired as part of Grim & Evil in the UK, but were part of the standalone Billy & Mandy in the U.S.

This season introduces the three title characters, boy-wizard Nigel Planter and supporting characters such as Dean Toadblatt, which constitutes a parody of the Harry Potter franchise. Other characters that make major appearances include Mandy's popular and snobby nemesis Mindy, the lonely villain Nergal, and Billy's aunt Sis.

Other characters that were also introduced are Hoss Delgado, who battles zombie brownies alongside Billy; and Eris, who keeps scheming to create chaos with the Apple of Discord.

== Episodes ==
No.	Title	Directed by	Story by	Storyboarded by	Original release date	Prod. code
1a	"Meet the Reaper"	Maxwell Atoms	Written by : Maxwell Atoms	TBA	June 9, 2000 (pilot); August 24, 2001	TBA
When Billy's pet hamster, Mr. Snuggles, celebrates his 10th birthday, the Grim Reaper comes for him. Billy's friend Mandy is reluctant in allowing it, so she proposes a deal to the Grim Reaper: if he beats the kids in a game, he can take the hamster, but if he loses, he will spare the hamster's life and become their "best friend forever". The Grim Reaper transports the kids to Limbo, where he challenges them to a game of limbo. Despite his best effort, Grim ends up losing because he is attacked by Mr. Snuggles at Mandy's own command. Note: Originally aired as part of Cartoon Network's "Cartoon Cartoon Weekend Big Pick", this episode was released on CartoonNetwork.com on June 9, 2000, and later aired on the channel proper on August 25, 2000, later being named the pilot winner to be picked up by the network for its own series. This is also the only episode not produced by Cartoon Network Studios, having been produced in 1999 by Warner Bros. Animation's subsidiary Hanna-Barbera, and the only episode of the series to be animated with cels, as the series began using digital ink and paint animation when it became a full series.
1b	"Skeletons in the Water Closet"	Dave Brain	Written by : Greg Miller	Greg Miller	August 24, 2001	TBA
Billy's mother, Gladys, first notices Grim in Billy's bed, then in the shower and subsequently starts to get panic surges thinking that Billy is in danger. Meanwhile, Harold, Billy's dad, just thinks that Gladys is imagining things. In the end, Gladys is sent to stay with Billy's Aunt Sis to try and calm herself down, but becomes stressed once more after seeing Grim waving from the driveway.
1c	"Opposite Day"	Dave Brain	Written by : Maxwell Atoms	Mike Stern	August 31, 2001	TBA
Billy and Mandy tell Grim it is "Opposite Day" and that, when they say something, they really mean the opposite. Due to his difficulty understanding the concept of Opposite Day, Grim has to do Mandy's chores, and is miserable throughout the day. Finally, Grim snaps and attempts to reap the children, but only ends up cutting their pie into slices. Grim thinks he understands when Billy and Mandy say they "want" pie, meaning they "do not want" pie. However, Mandy then says that when she said it was Opposite Day, it really was not.
2a	"Get Out of My Head!"	Dave Brain	Written by : Maxwell Atoms	Maxwell Atoms	September 7, 2001	TBA
After watching a movie, Grim teaches Billy to possess people by jumping into their heads. Billy possesses Mandy and makes her do assorted things like flirting with Irwin, kissing Mandy's mother, going into both men's and women's restrooms and eating earthworms. In the end, Billy leaves Mandy's head, but later that night, Mandy possesses Billy's cat, Milkshakes, to maul him as a form of revenge.
2b	"Look Alive!"	Brian Hogan	Written by : Maxwell Atoms	Paul McEvoy	August 31, 2001	TBA
Grim is bored of being left alone while Billy and Mandy are not with him. Grim decides to fulfill his dream by working as a swimsuit model, but, as he is a corpse, he is not hired. Subsequently, Billy and Mandy give him a makeover to look more human. In the end, Grim gets the job in a TV ad, but he is only in the commercial for a few seconds and is portrayed as an ugly person.
2c	"Mortal Dilemma"	Brian Hogan	Written by : Amy Rogers	Michael Diederich	September 7, 2001	TBA
Grim misses his life as the reaper of souls and, due to his bet, he cannot return to the Underworld, much to the hilarity of his Underworld co-workers. Having a sudden epiphany, Grim decides to be good and help people rather than try to take their souls. However, Grim's attempts at being good are faced with resistance from people, who are scared off by his appearance.
3a	"Fiend is Like Friend Without the 'R'"	Brian Hogan	Written by : Craig Lewis	Paul McEvoy	December 14, 2001	TBA
Billy wanders into a junkyard, where a massive hole in the earth opens up and pulls him down in. Later, Mandy and Grim get pulled in as well. They land at the center of the Earth, which is home of Nergal, a devilish creature. The lonely Nergal, who has been watching Billy and Mandy for some time, wants Grim to hand over the kids to him so they can be his friends forever. Grim happily leaves the kids behind as he returns to the surface; however, he later goes back for them because he can't handle the guilt of abandoning his friends. In the end, Grim is defeated by Nergal's electrified tentacles, but Mandy defeats Nergal merely by kicking him in the shin.
3b	"Recipe for Disaster"	Dave Brain	Written by : Maxwell Atoms	Mike Diederich	October 5, 2001	TBA
Billy, Mandy, Grim, and Pud'n are part of the "Person Scouts" (a Boy Scouts-esque organization) and need to sell cookies in order to win a badge. However, as Billy eats all of the cookies, Grim proposes to bake their own cookies using his aunt Kali's secret recipe. The cookies are a success and the troupe wins the contest. In the end, at the Person Scouts awards ceremony, aunt Kali reveals that the secret recipe contains insects, but everyone continues eating the cookies anyway.
3c	"A Dumb Wish"	Brian Hogan	Written by : Paul McEvoy	Paul McEvoy	October 12, 2001	TBA
While spring cleaning in the middle of November, Billy takes an old, cursed lamp from Grim's trunk and releases Grim's mother. The main trio are granted three wishes; Billy wastes his wish by wishing to know what to wish for. Mandy wishes Billy and Grim would "shut up", which causes both of them to zip their lips, so Grim never gets to make his wish. Then, Mandy decides to make the last wish to whoever makes her the happiest. When the two fail to make her happy, Mandy wishes everyone else in the world would go away, causing them to disappear, which Mandy is glad about.
4a	"Grim or Gregory?"	Brian Hogan	Gord Zajac	Shellie Kvilvang	July 26, 2002	TBA
On Halloween, Billy, Mandy, and Grim go trick-or-treating. Grim mistakes a woman for Atrocia, the host of the all-night Halloween marathon on TV and goes to talk to her. Upon looking at her face, Grim realizes his mistake; however, the woman mistakes Grim for her son, Gregory, and takes him home. At the same time, Billy mistakes Gregory, dressed as a Grim Reaper, for Grim and he takes him with them, while Mandy fails to convince him that he's wrong. In the end, Billy and Mandy take Gregory back to his mother after Billy accidentally kicks Gregory's mask off his face, and Grim goes back with them.
4b	"Grim vs. Mom"	Brian Hogan	Gord Zajac	Alex Almaguer	July 19, 2002	TBA
After having a nervous breakdown and leaving the house in the first episode, Billy's mother, Gladys, returns. She meets Grim again and, this time, she plans to destroy him once and for all. When Grim goes to the kitchen for a glass of water, Gladys attacks him and shatters his skeleton. In the end, Grim assures the kids that Gladys has won the battle but not the war.
4c	"Tastes Like Chicken"	Brian Hogan and John McIntyre	Gord Zajac	Mike Diederich	July 19, 2002	TBA
With Irwin not answering the phone, Billy's parents missing and Mandy saying she wants "Billy for dinner", Billy and Grim assume Mandy is a cannibal who ate Billy's parents and friends. Looking for proof, Billy and Grim find tiki figures and arrangements for a celebration in Mandy's backyard. Ultimately, it is revealed that they are just celebrating Billy's birthday. Still, Mandy burps out Irwin's glasses implying that she ate Irwin, causing Billy to scream in terror.
5a	"Something Stupid This Way Comes"	John McIntyre and Robert Alvarez	Craig Lewis	Maxwell Atoms	July 26, 2002	TBA
Nergal, the fiend from the center of the Earth, returns to the surface, bringing a carnival with him, trying once more to make friends with the surface dwellers. Billy tries to help Nergal make friends by being considerate, but Nergal fails to use his advice correctly. When Nergal is told that Grim was forced to be Billy and Mandy's friend-slave, Nergal then decides to force the world to be his friends by turning them into dark beings similar to him. In the end, Nergal turns Billy, Mandy, Grim, and even the viewer into one before the episode ends.
5b	"A Grim Surprise"	John McIntyre and Robert Alvarez	Rob DeSales	John McIntyre	August 2, 2002	TBA
Billy tells Grim to help him throw a surprise birthday party for Mandy. Then, a reluctant Grim helps Billy prepare a cake while keeping it a secret from Mandy. In the end, a somewhat surprised Mandy reveals that her birthday is not for five months, something that Billy already knew about, stating that makes it "a real surprise party."
5c	"Beasts & Barbarians"	Dave Brain	Gord Zajac	Michael Diederich	August 2, 2002	TBA
Billy and Irwin have been playing their favorite video game, Beasts and Barbarians, for three days non-stop. In an attempt to stop their video game addiction, Grim transports them all to a real-life version of the game. Seeing as Billy and Irwin are still doing good in their quest, Grim increases the difficulty by manipulating the traps himself. In the end, Billy, Mandy, and Grim return home escaping from a giant cyclops, while Irwin remains trapped.
6a	"Billy's Growth Spurt"	Brian Hogan	Gord Zajac	Michael Diederich	October 4, 2002	TBA
Billy eats too much junk food that makes him feel sick. Grim prepares him a remedy using his granny's recipe, but it causes a parasite to grow on Billy's back, which Billy names Yap-yap. Billy and Yap-yap continue eating junk food, so Mandy suggests to use the antidote to the original remedy. Eventually, Yap-yap, now looking like a smaller version of Billy, detaches himself from Billy and tries to escape from the antidote. In the end, Yap-yap drinks the antidote and is destroyed.
6b	"Hoss Delgado: Spectral Exterminator"	Brian Hogan	Gord Zajac	Brian Kindregan	August 9, 2002	TBA
Billy, Mandy, and Grim go to the museum on a school trip. There, they meet Hoss Delgado, self-appointed hunter of the paranormal, who upon spotting Grim, tries to eliminate him. Subsequently, Grim and Delgado engage in a fight. Finally, Delgado quits hunting Grim when he realizes Billy and Mandy control him. In the end, Delgado continues his own adventures and is seen fighting a werewolf.
6c	"Tickle Me Mandy"	Brian Hogan	Gord Zajac	Mucci Fassett	October 11, 2002	TBA
Mandy and her parents leave the city for a day, which makes Billy feel lonely. Then, Grim uses his supernatural powers to create a fake Mandy with pieces of dolls and toys for Billy to play with. However, the "new" Mandy is too aggressive with Billy, and he starts fearing her. The next day, the real Mandy returns home, and promptly destroys the new Mandy while on a seesaw.
7a	"Billy & The Bully"	John McIntyre and Robert Alvarez	Gord Zajac	Brett Varon	October 4, 2002	TBA
Billy is constantly provoked by a bully named Sperg and runs over to Grim for help. When Grim is also unable to help, Mandy comes onto the scene and beats up Sperg without even touching him. However, after seeing Sperg cry and run to his house, Billy runs after him to bring a hand ahead for friendship. In the end, the two frolic merrily and Sperg gives Billy a wedgie.
7b	"To Eris Human"	Dave Brain	Gord Zajac	Chris Savino	August 9, 2002	TBA
While going to the shopping mall with Billy and Mandy, Grim spots the seductive Eris, the cunning Goddess of Chaos and Discord, and tries to ask her out. However, Eris is not interested in the skinless Grim, but in the muscular Adonis. Then, Eris invites Mandy to join her in creating chaos using the Apple of Discord. Although initially they get along, Eris pulls a prank on Mandy, who subsequently tries to get revenge. In the end, Mandy fools Eris into thinking that Adonis is in the movie theater and Eris accidentally kisses Grim, who says that he will never wash his left cheek again.
7c	"Big Trouble in Billy's Basement"	Robert Alvarez and John McIntyre	Gord Zajac	Chris McCulloch	October 11, 2002	TBA
After taking the Underworld's "Bad Book" from Grim, Billy becomes possessed by an evil presence. Then, Billy steals Grim's scythe, and uses it to open a portal to summon Yog-Sothoth. In consequence, Mandy calls for Hoss Delgado to battle Billy. It is revealed that the portal can only be sealed by throwing the book into it. As Billy eats the book, Mandy throws Billy himself into the portal, restoring everything to normal. Seconds later, a portal opens up and Billy comes out and says they didn't want him there.
8a	"Battle of the Bands"	Robert Alvarez	Craig Lewis	Brett Varon	August 1, 2003	TBA
Billy wants to join Sperg's garage band, "Purple Filth", and take part in the upcoming battle of the bands. After witnessing Grim's prowess with the electric guitar, Sperg invites Grim instead. Billy's dad, adopting the rock and roll persona of "Mogar", decides he and Billy should go to the contest to make a surprise appearance. Billy impresses the audience with his armpit sounds. The song featured is "Darkness", composed by SPF-1000's David Ivy specifically for this episode.
8b	"Little Rock of Horrors"	Robert Alvarez	Gord Zajac	Maxwell Atoms	October 18, 2002	TBA
In this musical episode, which parodies Little Shop of Horrors, Billy befriends a singing brain-eating meteor (voiced by Voltaire) that falls from the sky after when everyone doesn't want to play with him because they are busy. With Billy's help, the creature grows bigger and eventually eats the brains of all people in Endsville (turning them into zombies with glowing green eyes). The last brain he eats is Mandy's, which results in the creature transforming into a pink, brain-eating Mandy meteor. The song featured is "BRAINS!", composed by goth artist Voltaire specifically for this episode.
8c	"Dream a Little Dream"	Dave Brain	Gord Zajac	Michael Diederich	October 18, 2002	TBA
Billy, Mandy, and Grim eat moldy pizza leftovers and after falling asleep, they have nightmares. Billy dreams of cute bunnies which turn into horrific and deadly monsters; Grim dreams of an endless number of bossy Mandys; Mandy dreams of being pulled into a volcano and then commanding demons at the rhythm of music. In the end, Mandy reveals that her dream was actually very pleasant and she eats the last slice of the rotten pizza.
9a	"Toadblatt's School of Sorcery"	Robert Alvarez	Ben Spergel	Mike Diederich and Maxwell Atoms	June 13, 2003	TBA
Grim sends Billy and Mandy to a sorcery school so the latter duo could avoid boring summer camps they were supposed to go to. The sorcery school is owned by Dean Toadblatt, an anthropomorphic frog. Billy and Mandy are sent to the most hated house of the school, Weaselthorpe, while Grim becomes a prefect for a more loved house, Gunderstank. Billy and Mandy team up with boy wizard Nigel Planter to sabotage Gunderstank's hopes of winning the house championship. Planter takes all the credit for the sabotage (which was Mandy's idea), but he is punished once he is found out by Toadblatt.
9b	"Educating Grim"	Juli Hashiguchi	Rachael MacFarlane	Brett Varon	June 13, 2003	TBA
Billy and Mandy take a reluctant Grim to school with them. Mandy's nemesis, Mindy, befriends Grim to annoy Mandy and Billy calls for their other friend, who is Abraham Lincoln. Mandy devises a plan in which Mindy ditches Grim, and keeps Abraham as her friend instead.
9c	"It's Hokey Mon!"	John McIntyre and Robert Alvarez	Gord Zajac	Mike Diederich	June 13, 2003	TBA
After watching Billy and Irwin play with their "Hokey Monsters" cards, Grim makes the monsters come to life. Soon, all the other kids want their own cards to be real too, and the city is soon under attack by a multitude of Hokey Monsters. To end the mayhem, Mandy draws her own card, Mandy's Monster, which defeats all the other monsters by turning them into toast.
10a	"Night of the Living Grim"	Juli Hashiguchi	Gord Zajac	Spencer Laudiero	June 20, 2003	TBA
Grim is lying sick in bed with "Encroaching Doom Syndrome". The Underworld doctors are not able to help Grim, and he becomes a human being. Back in Endsville, Grim seems attractive to women, but he ends up being punched by jealous boyfriends, especially Billy's dad Harold. Grim covers himself in the mucus that he produced when he was sick and becomes a skeleton again, and Billy tries it too.
10b–10c	"Brown Evil"	Robert Alvarez	Gord Zajac	Paul McEvoy	June 20, 2003	TBA
10b–10c	"Brown Evil"	Pat Shinagawa	Gord Zajac	Paul McEvoy	June 20, 2003	TBA
Part 1: Taking inspiration from his Pat the Baker video game, Billy decides to bake chocolate brownies. Billy uses "Evil Powder" from Grim's old trunk instead of salt, and the resultant brownies stink. Mandy tells Grim to get rid of the brownies, and he reluctantly does, but he also stores some of them in his skull. Soon, the stench of the brownies spreads through the world and starts resurrecting dead people, animals, and even food, as zombies. Part 2: Billy and Hoss Delgado, spectral exterminator, team up to destroy all the zombies that congregate outside the house, but the zombies reassemble into a bigger zombie. Delgado realizes that the zombie is after the brownies that Grim has in his skull, so Delgado and Grim battle furiously for them. The zombie eats the remaining brownies and falls apart.
11a	"Mandy, the Merciless"	Pat Shinagawa	Gord Zajac	Alex Almaguer	June 27, 2003	TBA
On a hot day when Billy, Mandy, and Irwin are bored, Grim uses a crystal ball to show them the future. In the distant future, Mandy has turned herself into a giant worm-like creature to be immortal, and now rules the whole world. Mandy gives false information to a clone of Billy to capture the members of a resistance that try to defeat her. This episode is a parody of God Emperor of Dune, with Mandy as the emperor Leto II, and Billy as Duncan Idaho.
11b	"Creating Chaos"	Pat Shinagawa	Gord Zajac	Brett Varon	June 27, 2003	TBA
When Billy, Mandy, and Grim go fishing, Eris, the goddess of chaos, gets Billy to help her use the Apple of Discord to create chaos. Instead of using the apple, Billy becomes distracted with his own idiotic errands, leading Eris to go insane. Billy finally decides to start creating chaos, but Eris is already too altered that she runs away.
11c	"The Really Odd Couple"	John McIntyre and Randy Myers	Gord Zajac	Mucci Fassett	June 27, 2003	TBA
Billy accidentally sets off a powerful stink bomb in Mandy's house and, while the house is being disinfected and fumigated, Mandy's family goes to live with Billy's. Billy and Mandy have a dispute over how to split Billy's room, prompting Grim to intervene. Mandy takes over the entire room, and imprisons Billy inside a brick wall with his mouth gagged by a dark red handkerchief.
12a	"Who Killed Who?"	Pat Shinagawa, John McIntyre, and Randy Myers	Gord Zajac	Paul McEvoy	July 4, 2003	TBA
After excluding Mandy from their board game "Who Killed Who?" for being a girl, Billy and Irwin mistakenly throw their dice into the backyard of a haunted house. Grim warns them about the ghost of Mrs. Doolin, a lady that lived there. Mandy dares them to go retrieve the dice, and she befriends Mrs. Doolin, who is alive and well, and who says that all the stories told about her (that anything that went beyond her fence into her garden never came back) are inventions from Grim, whom she beat long time ago at a staring contest. Fearing for Mandy's life, Billy also ventures into the house, but Mrs. Doolin and Mandy scare him away by posing as ghosts. It appears that Mrs. Doolin is in fact a ghost, and when she meant "beating Grim", it meant that she "beaten death".
12b	"Tween Wolf"	Pat Shinagawa	Gord Zajac	Mucci Fassett	July 4, 2003	TBA
After when Grim fails to pull a werewolf out of his hat, Irwin is bitten by said werewolf. Billy takes Irwin as his new pet dog, naming him Sprinkles, and enters him in the Endsville Dog Show to compete against Mandy's dog, Saliva. At the contest, Sprinkles is about to win, so Grim releases a "were-flea" whose bite causes the werewolf to revert to a naked Irwin.
13a	"Grim in Love"	John McIntyre and Robert Alvarez	Gord Zajac	Brett Varon	July 11, 2003	TBA
When Billy, Mandy, and Grim go to the beach, Grim falls in love with a goth woman named Malaria. Grim is having a good time with his girlfriend, but Mandy insists that will change when he tells her that he is not human. In the following date, Grim demonstrates his supernatural powers while dancing and, as predicted, Malaria leaves in panic.
13b	"Crushed"	John McIntyre and Robert Alvarez	Gord Zajac	Brett Varon	July 11, 2003	TBA
At school, Mandy rejects Irwin's invitation to go to the school dance with him. Billy introduces his foreign and mysterious new friend, Piff, and Mandy becomes desperate when she realizes that she has developed a crush on him. Mandy asks Grim to cut her heart out to stop being in love, but Grim has a better idea and gives Mandy a makeover. It turns out Piff also has a crush on Mandy, but she takes the opportunity to brutally turn him down, saying that "Romance is for the weak-minded."
13c	"Love is "Evol" Spelled Backwards"	Juli Hashiguchi	Craig Lewis	Paul McEvoy	July 11, 2003	TBA
It's Valentine's Day and Nergal, the fiend living in Earth's core, appears in Billy's house to court Billy's spinster aunt Sis. Billy tries ruining Nergal's date, to avoid becoming his nephew. Although initially Sis does not show interest in Nergal, she changes her mind when Nergal is stung by bees and she sees his "dance moves". Aunt Sis accepts Nergal's marriage proposal and accompanies him back to the center of the Earth.

== Home releases ==
The Grim Adventures of Billy & Mandy: Season 1 was released on Region 1 DVD on September 18, 2007. It contains all 13 episodes of the season. Along with bonus features, it also includes the Evil Con Carne episodes "Evil Con Carne", "Emotional Skarr", "Evil Goes Wild", "Evil on Trial", and "The Smell of Vengeance".

Other releases including The Grim Adventures of Billy & Mandy season one episodes:

- "Crushed" – Codename: Kids Next Door: Sooper Hugest Missions: File Two (August 23, 2005)
- "Battle of the Bands" – Cartoon Network: Christmas Rocks (October 4, 2005)
- The first eight episodes and "Crushed" – 4 Kid Favorites: The Hall of Fame Collection Vol. 3 (June 23, 2015)
