= Today We Are All Demons =

Studio album by Combichrist
- Released: January 20, 2009
- Genre: Aggrotech
- Length: 63:03
- Label: Out of Line/Metropolis Records

Combichrist chronology
What the Fuck is Wrong With You People? (2007)	Today We Are All Demons (2009)	Noise Collection Vol. 1 (2010)

Singles from Today We Are All Demons
- 1. "Sent to Destroy" Released: July 8, 2008; 2. "All Pain is Gone / Can't Change the Beat" Released: May 1, 2009; 3. "Scarred" Released: May 11, 2010

Professional ratings
Review scores
Source	Rating
Sputnikmusic	4/5 stars

Today We Are All Demons is an album by the American aggrotech band Combichrist. The album is available in both one disc and two disc versions. A remixed version (Beneath the World Mix) of the title track can be found on the Underworld film soundtrack.

== Track listing ==
All songs written by Andy LaPlegua.

No.	Title	Length
1.	"No Afterparty"	0:45
2.	"All Pain is Gone"	4:57
3.	"Kickstart the Fight" (featuring Gen from the Genitorturers)	5:02
4.	"I Want Your Blood"	5:13
5.	"Can't Change the Beat"	4:26
6.	"Sent to Destroy"	4:37
7.	"Spit"	4:28
8.	"New Form of Silence"	3:52
9.	"Scarred"	4:26
10.	"The Kill V2"	5:19
11.	"Get Out of My Head"	4:26
12.	"Today We Are All Demons"	5:02
13.	"At the End of it All"	4:35
14.	"Hidden Track" (as a part of track 13)	5:55

-If the hidden track is played in mono, it will reveal a female computerized voice mocking the listener for still using mono instead of stereo

== Track listing Dark Side CD ==
No.	Title	Length
1.	"Tranquilized"	5:12
2.	"Avenge"	4:31
3.	"Carnival of Terror"	4:58
4.	"Till Death Do Us Party"	4:24
5.	"Machine Love"	7:21
6.	"427 FE"	8:41
7.	"Caliber:Death"	5:06
8.	"Gore Baby, Gore"	16:39

== Samples ==
- "Scarred" opening line "You ever get the feeling that everything in America is completely fucked up?" comes from the american 1990 comedy-drama movie Pump Up The Volume and is spoken by main character Mark Hunter, played by Christian Slater.
