= Sex, Drogen und Industrial =

Sex, Drogen Und Industrial

EP by Combichrist
- Released: 2004
- Genre: Aggrotech
- Label: Out of Line

Combichrist chronology
Blut Royale (2003)	Sex, Drogen Und Industrial (2004)	Everybody Hates You (2005)

Sex, Drogen Und Industrial is an EP by the aggrotech band Combichrist. It spent seven weeks at number one in the Deutsche Alternative Charts.

== Track listing ==
No.	Title	Length
1.	"Blut Royale" (Instru-Mental Version)	5:30
2.	"Tractor"	5:01
3.	"Anatomy"	5:04
4.	"Sex, Drogen Und Industrial" (Low Tech)	5:20
5.	"Sex, Drogen Und Industrial" (Remixed by Soman)	5:01
6.	"Sex, Drogen Und Industrial" (Unlisted)	4:52
7.	"Vater Unser" (CombiCritters Remix)	4:48
8.	"Like to Thank My Buddies" (Live At Infest)	6:18
