= Combichrist =

American aggrotech band

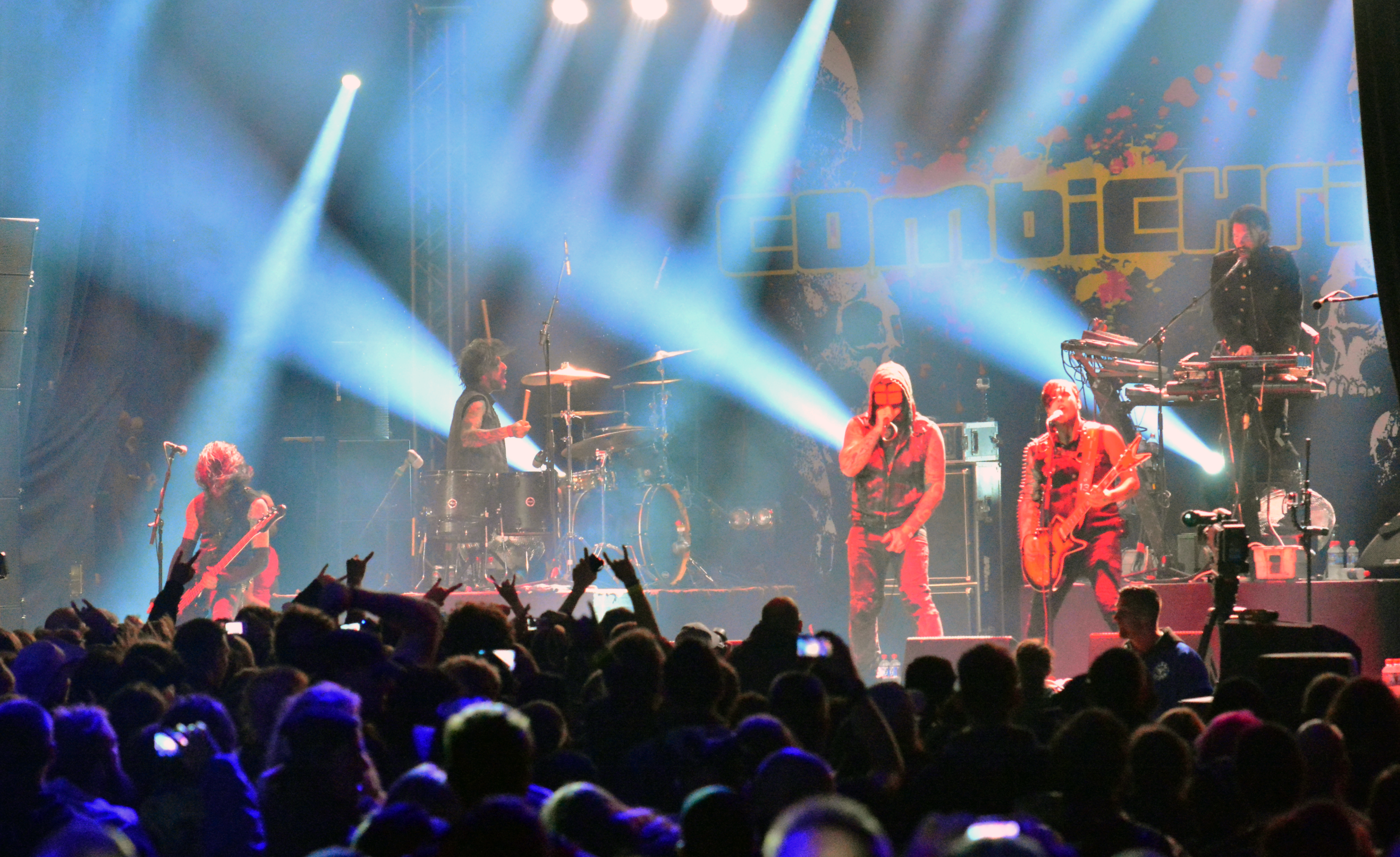
- Combichrist at Wacken Open Air 2015

Background information
- Origin: Atlanta, Georgia, U.S.
- Genres: Aggrotech; industrial metal; power noise (early)
- Years active: 2003–present
- Label: Out of Line
- Members: Andy LaPlegua; Eric13; Elliott Berlin; Jamie Cronander; Tim Van Horn
- Past members: Trevor Friedrich; Tiffany Lowe; Wes Borland; Jon Horton; Shaun F Kourtney Klein; Mr. Bjoern Petersen; Syn M Abbey Nex; Z. Marr; Brent Ashley; Joe Letz; Nick Rossi; Will Spodnick; Dane White
- Website: combichrist.com

Combichrist is an American aggrotech / industrial metal band formed in 2003 by Norwegian vocalist Andy LaPlegua, who also founded the bands Icon of Coil, Panzer AG, Scandinavian Cock and Scandy. Combichrist was formed in Atlanta, Georgia. The band consists of only LaPlegua in the studio, with a changing lineup of live performing members. Releases by the band have been very successful in terms of sales and charted in top positions for dance and alternative charts worldwide.

== History ==
=== Formation and early years ===
The first material that LaPlegua wrote for the project was a power noise/techno crossover track Thanx to my Buddies under the moniker D.r.i.v.E for the Advanced Electronics Vol. 2 compilation. The song was later remade into Like to Thank My Buddies on Combichrist's album Everybody Hates You. The project's name was later changed to Hudlager and then finally to Combichrist before the debut album The Joy of Gunz was released on the German record label Out of Line. The band name came from a fanzine of LaPlegua's in the 1990s, with Combichrist being a character in it that was a "punk-rock messiah". The character would go on drug and alcohol fueled rampages, later healing those whom he had beaten. A few years after the band's conception, LaPlegua departed Norway for the United States, which is now the current home-base for Combichrist and his other projects Scandy, Panzer AG, and Scandinavian Cock.

=== The Joy of Gunz (2003–2005) ===
Combichrist's first LP The Joy of Gunz was released in 2003. Sporting a fresh, original and aggressive new sound the brainchild of LaPlegua took the crowds by storm. On Halloween of the same year, the limited edition EP Kiss The Blade was released with 667 pressings which sold out in less than a week. In 2004, the second EP, Sex, Drogen Und Industrial, spent several weeks at number one in the DAC charts. At the same time that Sex, Drogen Und Industrial was released, a limited edition of 666 white-vinyl 12" pressings for Blut Royale were produced, and sold out quickly.

=== Everybody Hates You (2005–2006) ===
The year 2005 saw the release of Everybody Hates You and it was at this time that LaPlegua began labeling the music as "Techno Body Music" or TBM. The band released a song called "This Is TBM" on the Masterhit Recordings compilation This Is... Techno Body Music Vol. 1. They played this song live during their 2005 shows, adding vocals to it. No vocal version of the instrumental track was ever released, and the lyrics were instead later reworked for the track "Electrohead". After this release, LaPlegua stopped referring to their music as TBM. Shortly after the release of the album, Army On The Dance Floor producer Kourtney Klein was added as alternating keyboardist and drummer to the band. The full-length album featured two tracks that became club classics "This Shit Will Fuck You Up" and "This Is My Rifle" and it was also the project's U.S. debut on Metropolis Records. Further benchmarks were set with the release of the 2006 EP "Get Your Body Beat" the title track of which landed Combichrist its first appearance on Billboard's Top 10 Dance Singles chart. The music video for the single was included on the DVD release of the biopunk film The Gene Generation with the song also being used in the movie. The band embarked on a North American tour with KMFDM soon after the release of the single.

=== What the Fuck Is Wrong with You People? (2007–2009) ===
On March 6, 2007, What the Fuck Is Wrong with You People? was released to some critical praise and popularity. The album featured 2006's break out single "Get Your Body Beat", it had an explosive barrage of corrosive beats, leering vocals, and acidic melodies. WTFIWWYP? was a high energy, adrenaline charged piece of sonic battery. Combichrist played on the Gothic Cruise in 2008, and released a limited CDr EP only available to ticket-holders. Limited to 200 copies, it contains seven tracks, of which six are exclusive.

=== Today We Are All Demons (2009–2010) ===
Pull Out Kings producer and songwriter Z. Marr joined the band as keyboardist in January 2008 to begin work on the album Today We Are All Demons. According to an exchange with a fan, Trevor Friedrich of Imperative Reaction and formerly of Eighteen Visions, he was asked to join the band as a drummer with Joe Letz (of Wednesday 13) in October 2008. He replaced keyboardist Kourtney Klein, who began full-time work with Nitzer Ebb.

Combichrist released Today We Are All Demons on January 20, 2009. Combichrist immediately went on a highly successful North American tour with Black Light Burns (featuring Wes Borland of Limp Bizkit) and an extensive European tour with Rammstein. For part the European tour that year, Trevor was temporarily replaced by Mark Jackson of VNV Nation. Combichrist's song "Shut Up and Bleed" featuring W.A.S.T.E was put on the soundtrack for the horror movie The Collector. Their song "Today We Are All Demons" (Beneath the World Mix) was put on the soundtrack for the movie Underworld: Rise of the Lycans.

=== Making Monsters (2010–2014) ===
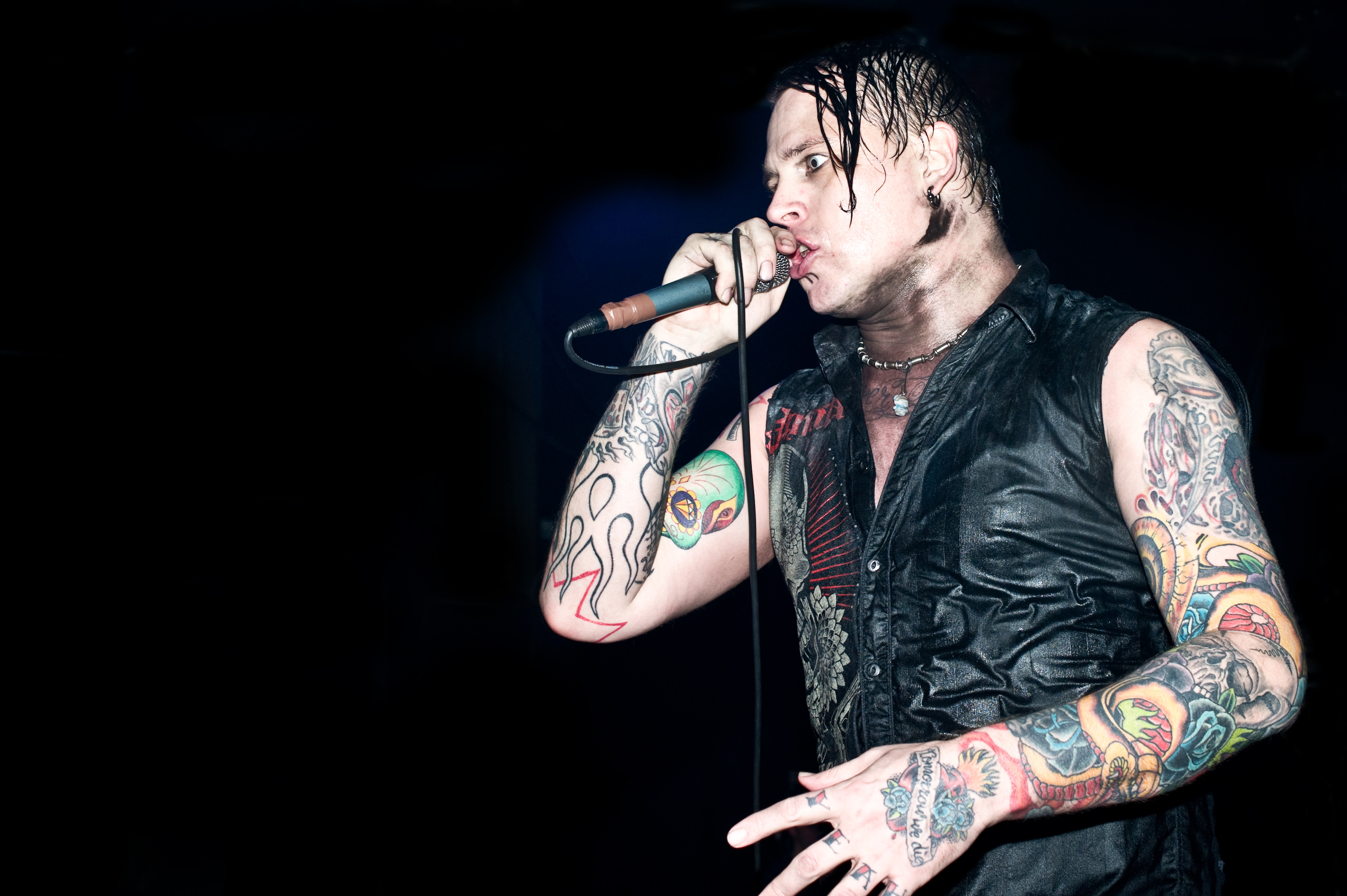
LaPlegua performing in 2010

Combichrist's album, Making Monsters, was released digitally on August 31, 2010, and on CD on September 28, 2010. Combichrist began a tour in support of the new album in late 2010, with Aesthetic Perfection and iVardensphere as the support bands. In 2011, after opening for Rammstein at Madison Square Garden in December 2010, both bands announced Combichrist would be supporting Rammstein on their North American tour and LaPlegua announced the "Monsters on Tour Part II" taking place around the scheduled Rammstein shows. The "Monsters on Tour Part II" had the same support as the 2010 tour but with the additions of Angel Spit and God Module performing with them on select dates.

Combichrist's music was prominently featured in the hack-n-slash style video game DmC Devil May Cry. Their track "Never Surrender" was featured in a gameplay demo, and Throat Full of Glass is played during the opening sequence. LaPlegua was heavily involved in the game's soundtrack.

A new song called Bottle of Pain was released in January 2012 for the Underworld: Awakening movie soundtrack.

=== We Love You (2014–2016) ===
In October 2013, LaPlegua announced on Facebook that there would be a new album on the way in 2014. On December 10, 2013, Combichrist announced the title of their 7th studio album, We Love You, with a March 2014 release date. The We Love You promo tour, included acts from William Control and New Years Day. Two singles were released from this album, "From My Cold Dead Hands" and "Maggots at the Party". The video for Maggots at the Party has been nominated by Berlin Music Video Awards for 2015 Most Trashy Video.

=== This Is Where Death Begins (2016) ===
This Is Where Death Begins is the eighth studio album. It was released on June 3, 2016. The album sees the band moving further away from their original electronic sound towards rock and metal.

=== Make Europe Great Again (M.E.G.A) Tour and This Is Where Death Begins (2016) ===
In February 2016, it was announced that the new album (as yet untitled, but often hashtagged #ThisIsWhereITBegins on Instagram posts about it) will be released in May. LaPlegua and the band's official Instagram pages posted snippets, clips, and hinted at guest artists – possibly some of Coal Chamber and Filter, and the female singer of MXMS. A full European tour is planned for June and July, with Nick Rossi (ex-New Years Day) joining the live line-up as a second drummer/percussionist. Meanwhile, the band's first show of the year – the Out Of Line Festival in Berlin – saw them perform without long-time keyboardist Z. Marr, who has left the band to pursue other interests (in June 2016 it was revealed he has joined <PIG>.) He was replaced by Elliott Berlin, of Aesthetic Perfection and Telemark, who has previously played keys for an "Old-School" Combichrist show and toured extensively as their show tech. Nick Rossi will be playing live keys on the forthcoming tour, in addition to his drumming duties – much as Shaun Frandsen did on the 2012 Evolution Tour.

On April 9, LaPlegua played a solo show at Complex, in Glendale, CA, which was a rare outing of the early instrumental incarnation of the band. The set list included tracks like Brain Bypass, Adult Content, Without Emotions, God Bless, Bulletfuck, Spit, God Wrapped In Plastic, The Kill (Instru-mental Version from "The Frost EP"), God Warrior, and other rarely or never played techno/noise tracks. Of the evening, LaPlegua said: "It was a rarity show, and I played the show exactly like I did back in the days when it was just me. No point playing obvious songs, when I can do those songs on any given show. I was happy to play all those songs I can never do with the full band, and I could have done a million more. Thanks to everyone coming out last night. I had a blast doing an old school set like this. For those who missed it; I will never do it again, so you missed out. To those who were there, thanks for sharing this night with me."

On April 18, it was announced that the new album will be called This Is Where Death Begins with a release date of June 3, 2016. Available on double vinyl and CD, a two-CD version includes a live recording of the Complex, LA, show. A three-CD and DVD version includes audio and video from the Summer Breeze Festival in 2015, making this the band's first official live release.

=== One Fire (2019) ===
Following the 2017 release of standalone track "Broken : United", a new album called One Fire was scheduled for a Spring release, delayed from Fall 2018, followed by a US tour in March/April and European shows (some festival, some headline) in June, July, August. Joe Letz announced his departure on January 17, after 13 years as main drummer, ahead of official album/tour announcements and in line with his new sober lifestyle. LaPlegua posted a farewell statement, confirming that "Joe's departure has nothing to do with the band itself. It is about recovery, a different life and spending more time with his family." LaPlegua added that he/Combichrist has "new management, new booking agency, Nick Rossi and Eric 13 working hard with me, Elliot Berlin on keyboards and a new second drummer Will Spodnick."

=== Podcast, side projects, and CMBCRST (2020–2025) ===
LaPlegua set up a Combichrist Patreon, where he posted some exclusive unreleased Scandy tracks and "Sec Four" which was used in DMC game trailers but never released. During 2020, he continued working on new Combichrist material for a 2022 album - beginning with the single "Not My Enemy" released early 2021 - and confirmed that Elliott Berlin has rejoined the band as a recording and touring member. In addition, the first official solo album will be released under the name LaPlegua - containing some songs that were originally destined for a third Panzer AG album. First single, "I Will Heal" was released online in February 2021, with the post-punk/goth rock album pencilled for a summer release. New material from Icon Of Coil is also in the works, as is a new project of Viking techno which will come out under the name HDLGIR. Meanwhile, the podcast "Oh Weird! It's Combichrist and Co!" began recording in early 2021, featuring LaPlegua and his sound/lights crew, Greg Gory and Chris Norris, often with special guests. The band hope to resume touring in late summer (Europe) and autumn/fall (USA) 2021, however guitarist Eric13 would be sitting it out with Jamie Cronander filling in for him. On September 15, 2021, the new single "Compliance" was released, accompanied by a lyric video. On May 13, 2022, another new single "Modern Demon" was released. On May 17, 2024, the band released a full-length album called CMBCRST. They toured this album extensively, throughout Europe, USA and Australia during 2024 and 2025. In addition, Andy returned to the "Old-School Electro" shows, playing short runs or standalone dates, often with Elliott Berlin on keys. The limited box version of CMBCRST includes the bonus disc "Old School Show Live In Glasgow", which was recorded there on 30th April 2023.

=== Lineup changes and The Venom In The Mouth Of God (2025/26) ===
On June 5, 2025, they released a new single called Desolation. On July 8, 2025, Dane White announced his amicable departure from the band after six years. His final appearance is in the music video for the "Rise" single, released on 28th August. On November 25, 2025 the band released their third new single "Feraline". Andy has repeatedly stated in interviews that the new album will reflect the Old-School Electro Shows he has been playing. He intends to release six singles in total, with the album out in 2027. On April 23, 2026, the fourth single "Demons Wanna Be Summoned," featuring King 810, was released. On May 2, 2026, the band's label Out Of Line announced that their next album, The Venom In The Mouth Of God would be released on July 24, 2026, with pre-orders going live the same day.

Tim Van Horn returned to drum for a festival in Mexico (which Eric13 missed due to working on his And The Pinheads project), and for the European festivals in August 2026 Mikko played drums - having previously played keys for the farewell Panzer AG festival shows earlier in the year. The new album tour cycle will begin in North America in September, with a drummer still to be announced.

== Band members ==
Combichrist at Hellfest 2019

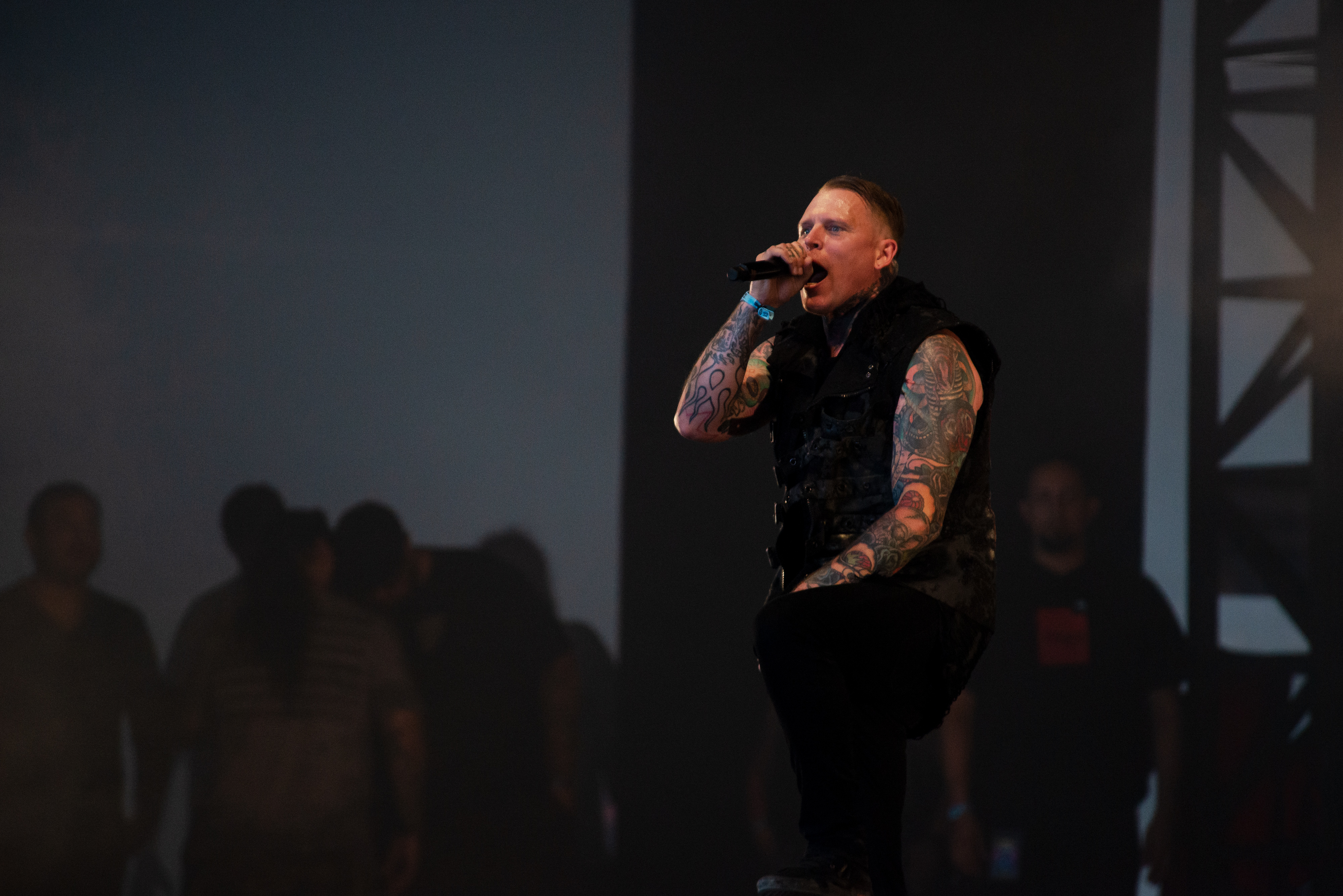

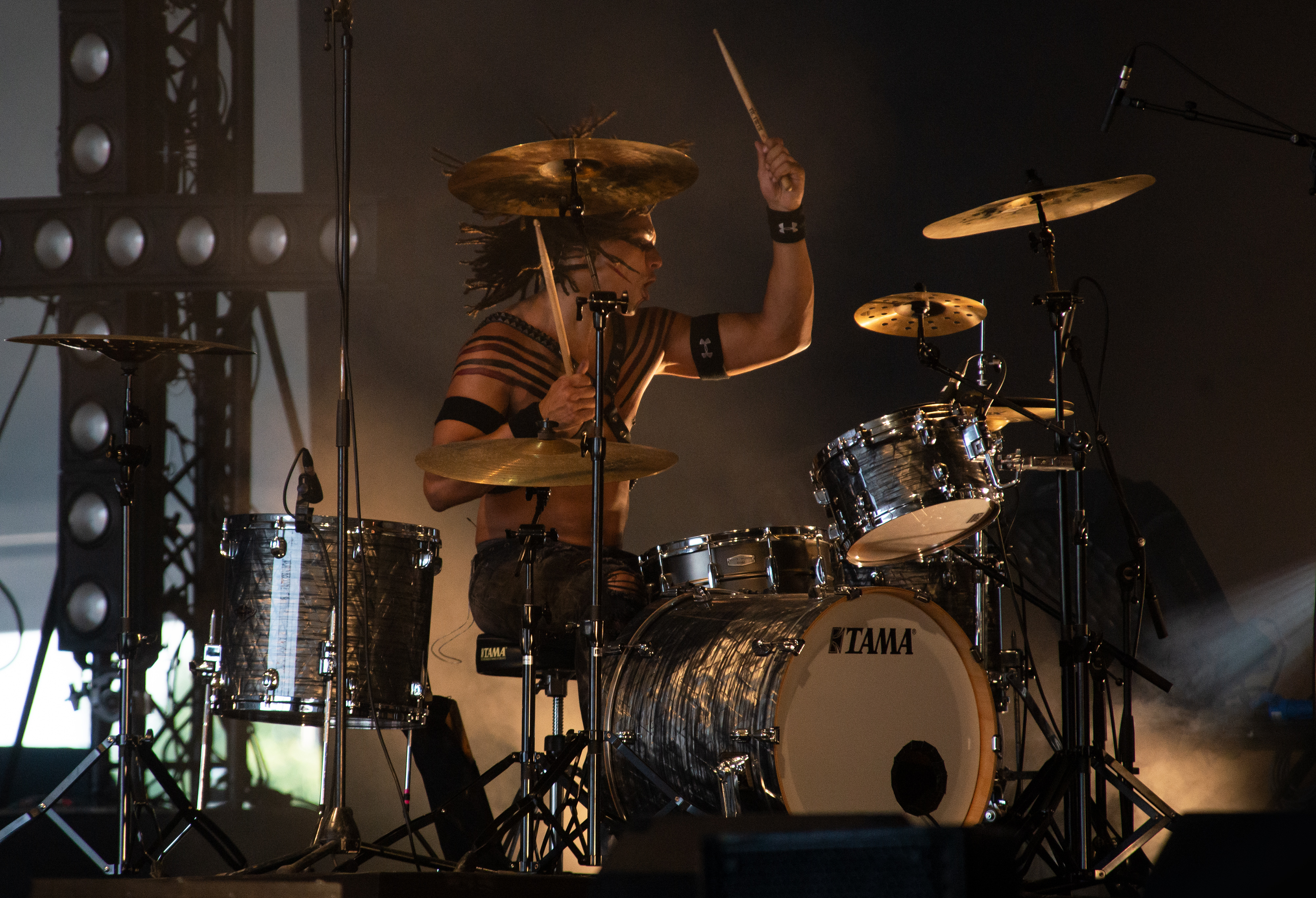

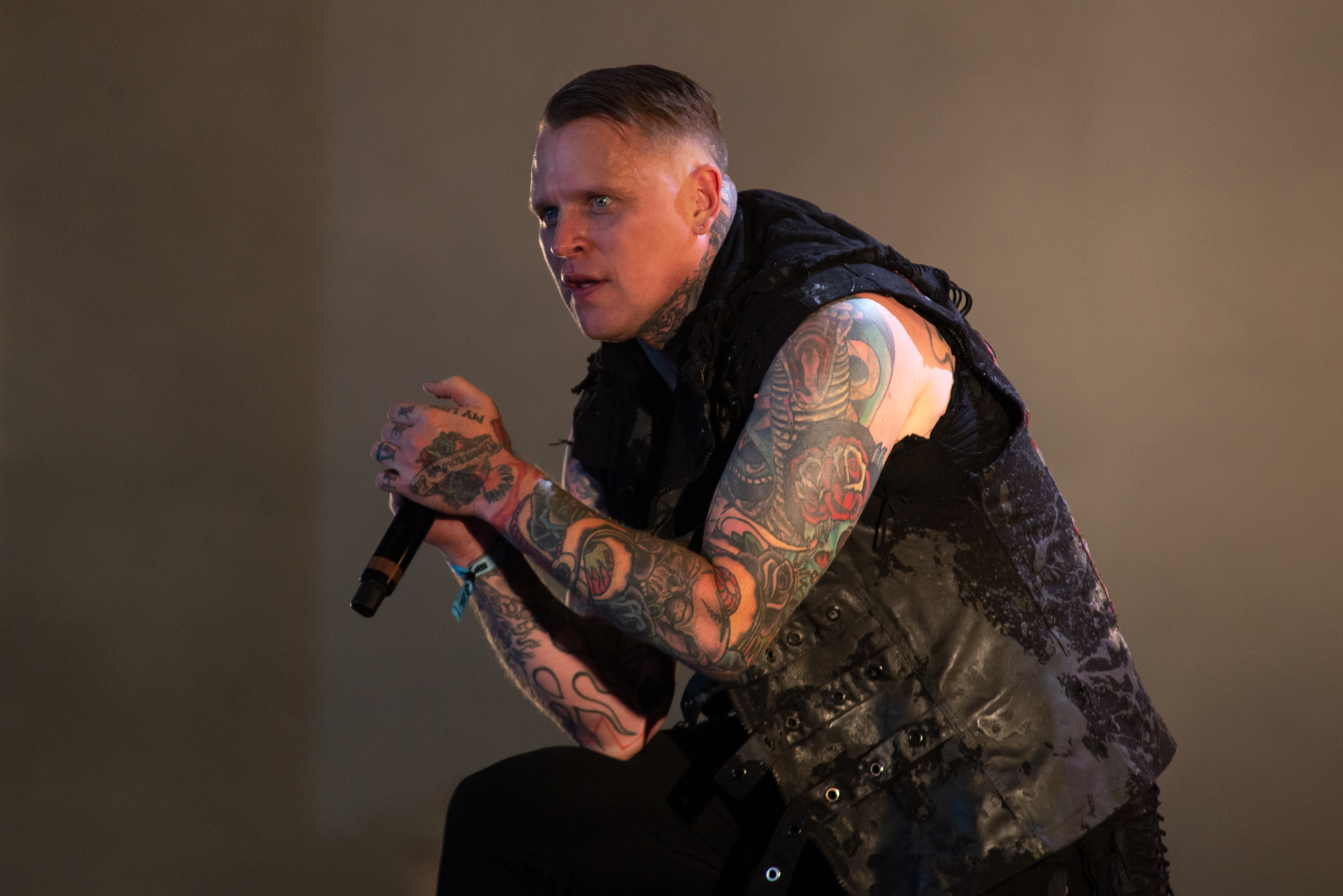

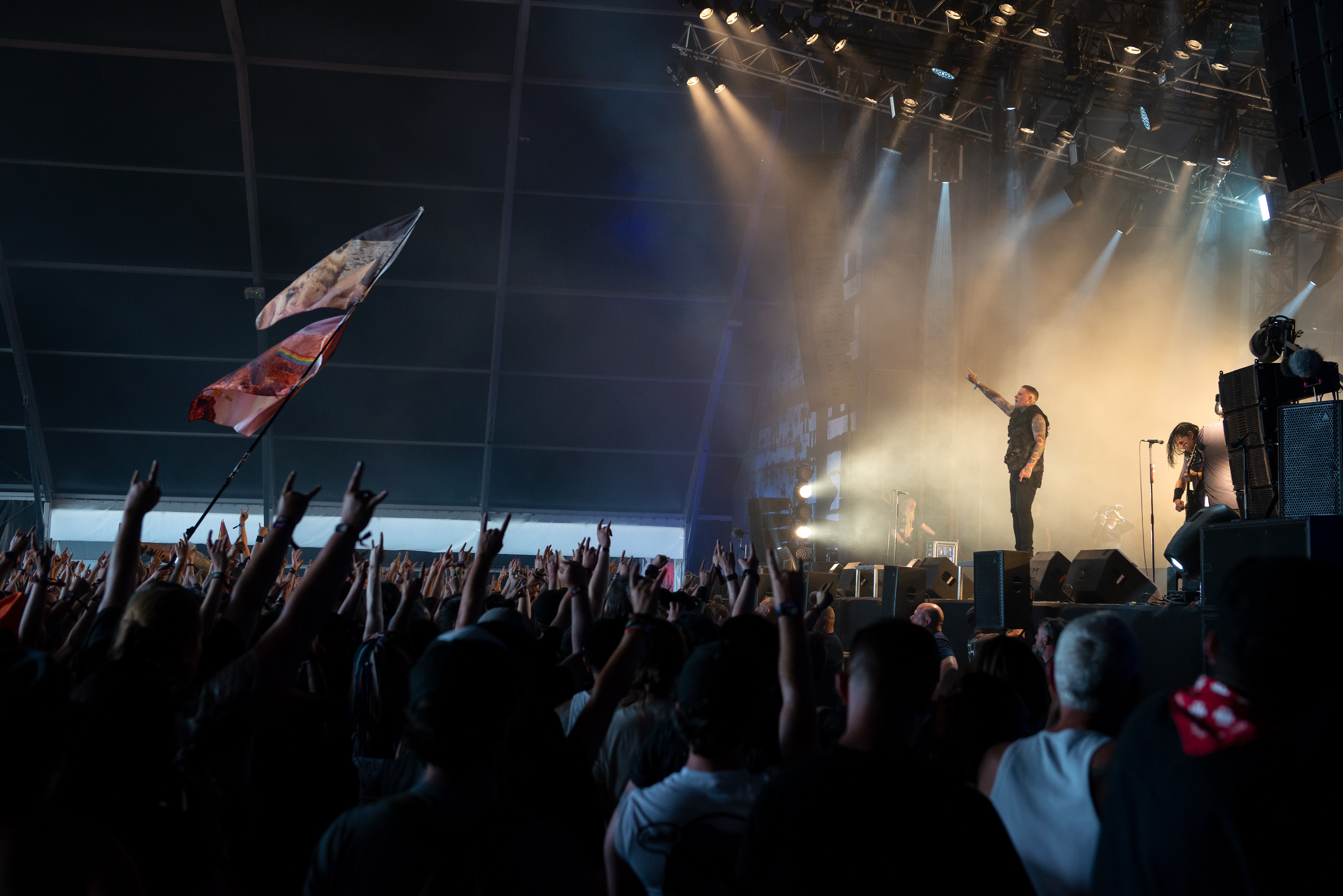

Combichrist was originally just LaPlegua onstage, followed by LaPlegua plus one other 2003–2006. There was no set or regular lineup until Joe Letz joined on drums, when it changed and expanded to also include Shaun F and Jon Horton. Combichrist has existed and played as a solo act, a duo, a trio, a quartet, a quintet, and on occasion has played shows with six members. The Past Members include full and touring members of the band, while the Guest Members includes special appearances for one or two shows only. Elliott Berlin, for example, guested on keys for an old-school show (Glasgow) and on keys with the full band when Z_Marr quit (Berlin), before becoming a full touring member in 2018.

Current members

- Andy LaPlegua – lead vocals (2003–present)
- Eric13 – guitars, backing vocals (2014–2021, 2022–present)
- Elliott Berlin – keyboards, bass, backing vocals (2013, 2016, 2018–2019, 2021, 2022–present)
- Jamie Cronander – guitars, keyboards, backing vocals (2021–present)
- Tim Van Horn – drums (2026–present)

Guest members

- Christian Lund – keyboards (c.2006/2007, Copenhagen show)
- Mark Jackson – percussion (5 shows Trevor missed, 2009)
- Tim Van Horn – percussion/drums (2012 Summer Darkness festival/ 2026 Ritual Siniestro Festival, Mexico)
- Tiffany Lowe – keyboards (2013)
- Daniel Meyer (SAM/Synthetic Adrenaline Music - not to be confused with Daniel Myer of Haujobb) – keyboards (2013 old-school show only)
- Daniel Graves – keyboards (2013 old-school show only)
- Chris Norris – keyboards (old-school shows Dec 2021/Jan 2022)
- Todd Hansen – drums (Australian tour Sep 2025)
- Greg Gory – keyboards (old-school shows [Canada] Jan 2026)
- Mikko – drums(EU festival shows, summer 2026)

Past members

- Mr. [Bjoern] Petersen – programming, keyboards, guitars (2003–2005), programming, keyboards (2013, old-school show only)
- Shaun F – keyboards, percussion (2005–2007, 2012)
- Sascha Pniok – keyboards (2005 - 5 or 6 shows including Hamburg, London, Mera Luna)
- Syn M – keyboards (2005–2007)
- Gregory "Z.Marr" Steward – electronics, keyboards, percussion, backing vocals (2008–2015)
- Wes Borland – guitars (2009, 2010)
- Abbey Nex – bass, guitars, backing vocals (2009–2014)
- Oumi Kapila – guitars (2016, 2017)
- Brent Ashley – bass, backing vocals (2014–2018)
- Jon Horton – percussion (2006–2007)
- Kourtney Klein – percussion (2008)
- Trevor Friedrich – percussion (2009–2012)
- Joe Letz – drums (2006–2019)
- Nick Rossi – keyboards, percussion, backing vocals (2016–2017), drums (2018, selected European shows only), percussion (2018–2019)
- Will Spodnik – percussion (2018, selected European shows only, 2019–2021), drums (2017, 1 show only)
- Dane White – drums (2019–2025)

== Discography ==
Studio albums

- The Joy of Gunz (September 1, 2003)
- Everybody Hates You (March 8, 2005)
- What the Fuck Is Wrong with You People? (March 6, 2007)
- Today We Are All Demons (January 20, 2009)
- Making Monsters (September 28, 2010)
- No Redemption (Official DmC: Devil May Cry Soundtrack) (January 25, 2013)
- We Love You (March 25, 2014)
- This Is Where Death Begins (June 3, 2016)
- One Fire (June 7, 2019)
- CMBCRST (May 17, 2024)
- The Venom in the Mouth of God (July 24, 2026)
