= Everybody Hates You =

Studio album by Combichrist
- Released: March 8, 2005
- Genres: Aggrotech, EBM
- Length: 124:36
- Labels: Out of Line, Metropolis

Combichrist chronology
The Joy of Gunz (2003)	Everybody Hates You (2005)	What the Fuck Is Wrong With You People? (2006)

Singles from Everybody Hates You
- 1. "Blut Royale" Released: November 16, 2004

Professional ratings
Review scores
Source	Rating
AllMusic	3/5 stars
Exclaim.ca	positive

Everybody Hates You is the second full-length studio album by the American aggrotech band Combichrist. It was released on March 8, 2005, through the Out of Line record label.

== Track listing ==
=== CD1 ===
No.	Title	Length
1.	"This Shit Will Fuck You Up"	4:45
2.	"Enjoy the Abuse"	5:14
3.	"Today I Woke to the Rain of Blood"	5:45
4.	"I'm Happy Anyway"	5:11
5.	"Blut Royale"	5:33
6.	"Who's Your Daddy, Snakegirl?"	6:23
7.	"Feed Your Anger"	4:50
8.	"God Bless"	4:28
9.	"Happy Fucking Birthday"	4:47
10.	"This Is My Rifle"	4:58
11.	"Like to Thank My Buddies"	6:18
12.	"Lying Sack of Shit"	5:01
13.	"Without Emotions"	4:40

=== CD2: Dark Side (Digipack edition) ===
No.	Title	Length
1.	"The Undertaker"	4:50
2.	"Red Signal"	5:36
3.	"Wreckage"	5:54
4.	"Rubber Toy"	5:28
5.	"Below"	7:22
6.	"Fever"	4:49
7.	"Beneath Every Depth"	7:59
8.	"The Corpse Under My Bed"	7:01
9.	"Long Gone"	7:44
