= List of electro-industrial bands =

This is a list of bands that play electro-industrial and its subgenres: dark electro, aggrotech, and power noise.

== !? ==
- [:SITD:]
- :wumpscut:

== 0–9 ==
- 3Teeth

== A ==
- A Split Second
- à;GRUMH...
- Accessory
- Advanced Art
- Aesthetic Perfection
- Agonoize
- Alter Der Ruine
- Amduscia
- Anders Manga
- Android Lust
- Angelspit
- Armageddon Dildos
- Ashbury Heights
- Asmodeus X
- Assemblage 23
- Aural Vampire
- Ayria

== B ==
- Birmingham 6
- Blue Stahli
- Blutengel
- Borghesia

== C ==
- C-Tec
- Celldweller
- Cenobita
- Chemlab
- Circle of Dust
- Click Click
- Cobalt 60
- Cold Therapy
- Combichrist
- Concrete/Rage
- Covenant
- Crocodile Shop
- Culture Kultür
- Cyanotic
- Cyberaktif
- Cyborg Attack
- Cygnosic

== D ==
- Dance or Die
- Das Ich
- Dawn of Ashes (early)
- Decoded Feedback
- Detroit Diesel
- Die Krupps
- Die Warzau
- Digital Poodle
- Dive
- dreDDup

== E ==
- Edge of Dawn
- Eisenfunk
- Esplendor Geometrico
- Euphorbia
- Evils Toy (before changing to T.O.Y.)

== F ==
- Feindflug
- Finite Automata
- Flesh Field
- Forma Tadre (Navigator)
- Front 242
- Front Line Assembly
- Funker Vogt

== G ==
- Glis
- God Module
- Grendel
- Gridlock

== H ==
- Hatari
- Haujobb
- Headscan
- Heimataerde
- HEALTH
- Hocico

== I ==
- Icon of Coil
- Imperative Reaction
- In Strict Confidence
- Informatik
- Interface
- iVardensphere

== K ==
- Kevorkian Death Cycle
- Kidneythieves
- Klinik
- KMFDM

== L ==
- Laibach
- Leæther Strip
- Lights of Euphoria

== M ==
- Meat Beat Manifesto
- Mentallo & the Fixer
- Mind in a box
- Mommy Hurt My Head
- My Life with the Thrill Kill Kult

== N ==
- Nachtmahr
- Negative Format
- Neikka RPM
- New Mind
- Noise Unit
- Noisuf-X
- Non-Aggression Pact
- Nitzer Ebb
- Numb

== O ==
- ohGr
- Oomph!
- Orange Sector

== P ==
- Panic Lift
- Placebo Effect
- Pouppée Fabrikk
- Pride and Fall
- Project Pitchfork
- Psy'Aviah
- Psychopomps
- Psyclon Nine
- PTI

== R ==
- Rabia Sorda
- Razed in Black
- Reaper
- The Retrosic
- Rotersand

== S ==
- Schallfaktor
- Sheep on Drugs
- Skinny Puppy
- Society Burning
- Sonar
- Spahn Ranch
- Spetsnaz
- Straftanz
- Suicide Commando
- Swamp Terrorists

== T ==
- Testube
- Terrorfakt

== U ==
- Unit 187
- Unter Null

== V ==
- Velvet Acid Christ
- Virtual Embrace
- VNV Nation
- Vomito Negro

== X ==
- X-Fusion
- X Marks the Pedwalk
- Xorcist
- Xotox

== Y ==
- Yeht Mae
- yelworC
- Young Gods

== Z ==
- Zombie Girl

== See also ==
- List of industrial music bands
- List of industrial metal bands
