= C.O.M.A. =

Annual Montreal underground music festival

- Deftly-D performing with a metal grinder as part of Pneumatic Detach at C.O.M.A. (2005)
- Genre: Electronic music, industrial, power electronics, noise
- Dates: 2004 to 2007
- Locations: Montreal, Quebec, Canada
- Website: C.O.M.A. myspace

C.O.M.A. was a yearly weekend underground music festival held in Montreal, Quebec, Canada, from 2004 to 2007 featuring industrial, power electronics, noise and other alternative electronic musicians and DJs. There were both independent and signed bands who were booked to play, as well as many vendors for music and related paraphernalia. Featured record labels and noteworthy companies include: Ant-Zen, Geska Records, .Angle.Rec., Cyclic Law, Force of Nature Records and Bugs Crawling out of People. In 2008, C.O.M.A. was essentially replaced by the Kinetik Festival, which ran until 2013. In 2014, Kinetik was replaced by Aftermath, held in Toronto and featuring many of the same bands that were originally intended to play at the seventh edition of Kinetik.

== C.O.M.A. lineups by year ==
2004

Converter | Iszoloscope | Paratonerf | PerfectionPlastic |

DJs: | Redsun |

VJs: | TIND] |

2005 (April 16–17)

Pneumatic Detach | Re agent | Scrapedx | Prospero | Fractured | Sorehead | PTSMC | Iszoloscope | Displacer | S:Cage | PerfectionPlastic | Stendeck | LCEDP |

DJs: | Peter lee | Biotek | lvx | Razorgrrl vs Blackpaps | Hazmat | Morgana |

VJs: | TIND | ATHANORE

2006 (March 24-25-26)

Grendel | Headscan | Re_agent | Stendeck | Fractured | Famine | Memmaker | DYM | Iszoloscope | Scrapedx | Terrorfakt | Pneumatic Detach + It-Clings | Prospero | Autoclav 1.1 | Cervello Elettronico | PerfectionPlastic | LCEDP | Sorehead | Ad·ver·sary | Cenotype | Vromb | The Law Rah Collective | Displacer | Monstrare featuring Cordell Klier | Szkieve | S:Cage | The Liar's Rosebush | Kriss | Visions | Grkzgl | Pine Tree State Mind Control |

DJs: | DJ leslie | Peter lee | Twiin | Na | lvx | Razorgrrl | l:li | Biotek | Uriel | blackpaps | kaotik

VJs: | TIND | FRIGO | SAT MIX SESSION | ATHANORE

2007 (April 6-7-8)

Hocico | Tactical Sekt | Mlada Fronta | Ah Cama-Sotz | Vromb | Law Rah Collective | Ordinateur | Enduser | Orphx | Scrap edx + Liar's Rosebush | Terrorfakt | C/A/T | Cenotype | Terretron | Pine Tree State Mind Control | Bereft | The Vomit Arsonist | Iszoloscope | Decoded Feedback | S:cage | Distorted Memory | Memmaker | Perfectionplastic | LCEDP | Sorehead | Cake Builder | Famine + It-Clings | Visions | Kriss | Victor | pléonasme | Blank XPeriment | Scrapedx | LOW |

DJs: | blackpaps | kaotik | Jadevixen | razorgrrl | lvx | biotek | redsun | uriel | leslie | nosr | Na

VJs: | TIND | SAT MIX SESSION | FRIGO + FIL | ATHANORE | SAKURA | MISST | OUANANICHE | BUNKER TV | jo_cool

== Kinetik lineups by year ==
2008 (May 15-16-17)

Nitzer Ebb | Ascii Disko | The Horrorist | Funker Vogt | Rabida Sorda | Kiew | Noisuf-X | Headscan | Distorted Memory | Memmaker | Synnack | Cenotype | Sonar | This Morn' Omina | Xotox | Mono No Aware | Empusae | Terrorfakt | Iszoloscope | Displacer | Tonikom | The DJ Producer | The Outside Agency | Manu Le Malin | Lenny Dee | Satronica | Feindflug

2009 (May 14-15-16-17)

Corrupted Suburbs | Ayria | Memmaker | Terrorfakt | Project Pitchfork | Interlace | Marching Dynamics | DYM | Life Cried | Aesthetic Perfection | Soman | God Module | Reaper | Amduscia | Grendel | Accessory | Ad·ver·sary | Cervello Elettronico | Mimetic | Architect | Iszoloscope | Imminent | Noisex | Winterkalte | Caustic | Left Side Neighbour | Astyplaz | Necessary Response | FGFC820 | Pride and Fall | Assemblage 23 | Das Ich | Icon of Coil | XP8

2010 (May 12-13-14-15-16)

Ascii.Disko | DJ Mini | David Carretta | DJ Jordan Dare | Fixmer/McCarthy | Left Side Neighbour | The Gothsicles | Alter Der Ruine | Left Spine Down | Chemlab | 16Volt | T-Faktor | Imperative Reaction | Tyske Ludder | Leaether Strip | Vomito Negro | Caustic | Aliceffekt | Iszoloscope | Komor Kommando | Synapscape | FGFC 820 | SAM | Decoded Feedback | Absolute Body Control | Combichrist | Alien Vampires | Ivardensphere | Memmaker | Destroid | Ambassador21 | Nachtmahr | Terrorfakt | Tactical Sekt | Hypnoskull | Hocico | Dive | FabrikC | Torrent Vaccine/Synnack | Detroit Diesel | Fractured | Glenn Love | Cesium 137 | Run Level Zero | Faderhead | Lights of Euphoria | Frozen Plasma | Rotersand | Covenant | Melotron | Unter Null

2011 (May 19-20-21-22-23)

Funker Vogt | Front Line Assembly | Die Krupps | Ivardensphere | Iszoloscope | Everything Goes Cold | Corrupted Suburbs | The Klinik | Agonoize | God Module | S.K.E.T. | Phosgore | Modulate | E.S.A. | VNV Nation | Front 242 | Terrorfakt | Xotox | X-Rx | Monolith | W.A.S.T.E. | Covenant | Solitary Experiments | Bruderschaft | Assemblage 23 | Mind.In.A.Box | System Syn | Squarehead | Suicide Commando | FGFC820 | Aesthetic Perfection | Painbastard | Unter Null | Continues | Aliceffekt

(Funker Vogt, Front 242 and Covenant were replacements for KMFDM, Panzer AG and And One, respectively, who canceled their appearances)

2012 (May 17-18-19-20)

Ad·ver·sary | Beborn Beton | Blutengel | C-Lekktor | Cenotype | Combichrist | E-Craft | End.user | FGFC820 | The Gothsicles | Grendel | Haujobb | Heimatærde | Hocico | HYPR! | Iszoloscope | Klangstabil | Lenny Dee | Orphx | Merkurius | Miss Construction | Mutante | Nachtmahr | Nitronoise | Noisex | Panzer AG | Projekt F | Satronica Shiv-R | SITD | The Speed Freak | S.P.O.C.K. | Stormtrooper | Winterkälte

2013 (May 23-24-25-26)

Suicide Commando | Project Pitchfork | Aesthetic Perfection | FGFC820 | Terrorfakt | Decoded Feedback | Ayria | The Gothsicles | Iszoloscope | Life Cried | Encephalon | Cenotype | Displacer | Tonikom | Nitro Noise | Fractured | DYM | Frontal Boundary | Projekt F | MyParasites

== See also ==
- List of industrial music festivals
- List of electronic music festivals
