= Everything Goes Cold =

Industrial band from California

- Origin: Alameda, California, United States
- Genres: Industrial Rock; American Coldwave
- Years active: 2005–present
- Label: Metropolis Records
- Members: Eric Gottesman; Mike Blodgett; Jamie Cronander; Morgan Tucker
- Past members: Conan Neutron; Sam Pfannkuche; Tyler Newman; James Webb; Josh Zero
- Website: everythinggoescold.com

Everything Goes Cold is an American industrial band from California. Their lead singer, Eric Gottesman, is notable as a founding member of industrial metal band Psyclon Nine, and a live musician with Ayria, Caustic, XP8, Unter Null, and a number of other industrial bands. Everything Goes Cold has released two full-length albums to date, 2009's vs. General Failure (Bit Riot Records), and 2014's Black Out the Sun (Metropolis Records), as well as two remix EPs and several digital singles. Both albums met with critical acclaim within the industrial music community. The first album featured guest appearances from Daniel Myer and other industrial luminaries, as well as production by Ted Phelps of Imperative Reaction, and the second was produced by Wade Alin of Christ Analogue and The Atomica Project.

In 2011, Everything Goes Cold completed a major US tour with Aesthetic Perfection and Faderhead, and were featured at Festival Kinetik in Montreal. They completed another full US tour with Imperative Reaction, Ludovico Technique, and The Witch Was Right in 2012, and have conducted extensive regional tours in the interim.

Numerous remixes by Everything Goes Cold have been released, including mixes for 16volt, Terrorfakt, and Ayria. Everything Goes Cold itself has, in turn, been remixed by Dismantled, Hate Dept., SAM, and many more. One of only three remixes ever completed by defunct Los Angeles cult sensation Babyland was for Everything Goes Cold.

== Members ==
=== Current ===
- Eric Gottesman - lead vocals, keyboards, programming (2005–present)
- Mike Blodgett - keyboards, backing vocals (2009–2011), drums (2012–present)
- Jamie Cronander - guitars (2014–present)
- Morgan Tucker - keyboards (2014–present)

=== Former ===
- Conan Neutron - keyboards, backing vocals (2008)
- Tyler Newman - keyboards, backing vocals (2009)
- Kenny Pardo - drums (2007–2011)
- Sam Pfannkuche - drums (2006)
- James Webb - guitars (2006-2014)
- Josh Zero - keyboards, backing vocals (2006–2008, 2012–2014)

== Discography ==
=== Releases ===
- Prepare To Be Refrigerated - (CD, EP) 2008 - Sonic Mainline
- Fail (Swift & Concise Failure Mix By Out Out) - (Digital) 2008 - Sonic Mainline
- Everything Goes Cold & XP8 Present: The Squidhead Liberation Front, Featuring Battery Cage and Claire Voyant - (Digital) 2008 - No Label
- vs. General Failure - (CD, Album) 2009 - Bit Riot Records
- The Tyrant Sun - (CD, EP) 2012 - Metropolis Records
- Black Out The Sun - (CD, Album) 2014 - Metropolis Records
- IAMERROR - (Digital) 2014 - Metropolis Records

=== Remixes ===
- Unter Null - Your Nightmare (Everything Goes Cold Mix) - Sick Fuck 2005 - Alfa Matrix
- Ayria - My Device (Everything Goes Cold Mix) - Flicker (2CD) 2005 - Alfa Matrix
- Terrorfakt - Skullfucker (Everything Goes Cold Remix) - Reworks2: Friendly Fire 2007 - No Label
- Left Spine Down - Last Daze (Everything Goes Cold Remix) - Smartbomb 2.3: The Underground Mixes 2009 - Synthetic Sounds
- Caustic - BBB (Everything Goes Cold Mix) - Kinetik Festival Volume Two 2009 - Artoffact Records
- 16volt - Alkali : Cold - American Porn Songs // Remixed 2010 - Metropolis Records
