= Recurse (album) =

Studio album by Finite Automata
- Released: December 29, 2012
- Recorded: Mid–late 2012
- Genre: Electro industrial; industrial rock; electronic; noise
- Length: 39:26
- Label: Beyond Therapy
- Producer: Mod Eschar

Finite Automata chronology
Here Won No One (2011)	Recurse (2012)	Second Circle (2015)

Recurse is the debut studio album released by American electro-industrial band Finite Automata. It was released on December 29, 2012, by Beyond Therapy Records in digital format, and released on compact disc on February 22, 2013.

The album features reworked and re-recorded material from the group's previous demo-release Here Won No One, as well as reworked material written between 2007 and 2010. Its name is a reference to the computer science concept of recursion, and alludes to conflict that feeds back into itself.

== Track listing ==
No.	Title	Length
1.	"Rot Inside"	4:59
2.	"Decimate"	2:48
3.	"War Saw"	3:48
4.	"Filth In Eyes"	4:43
5.	"Normalcy"	2:17
6.	"Heaven's Itch"	2:08
7.	"Here Won No One"	5:20
8.	"Caustic"	5:00
9.	"The Dervish (second vision)"	4:12
10.	"The Shroud"	4:11
Total length:		39:26

== Personnel ==
- Mod Eschar - producer, vocals, lyrics, sampling, programming
- c. Grendel - synthesizers, keyboards, programming
- Mat Syn - synthesizers, guitars, bass
- Josh Hack - recording engineer
- Eric Sochocki - mastering

== Samples ==
- A number of the samples from "Filth In Eyes" are taken from Roman Polanski's film The Tenant.
- A number of the samples from "Normalcy" are taken from home video recordings by David Koresh
- A sample from the beginning of "The Shroud" was taken from the 1991 segment of Unsolved Mysteries entitled "Allagash Abductions", and the end of the song samples part of the Jim Jones suicide recording.
