= Timewave Zero =

Timewave Zero may refer to:

- Timewave Zero, a theory by Terence McKenna

== Music ==
- Timewave Zero (Grendel album), 2012
- Timewave Zero (Blood Incantation album), 2022
- "Timewave Zero", a song by Anaal Nathrakh from the album Eschaton
- "TimeWave Zero", a track by DJ Ummet Ozcan
