= Grendel (band) =

Dutch music group

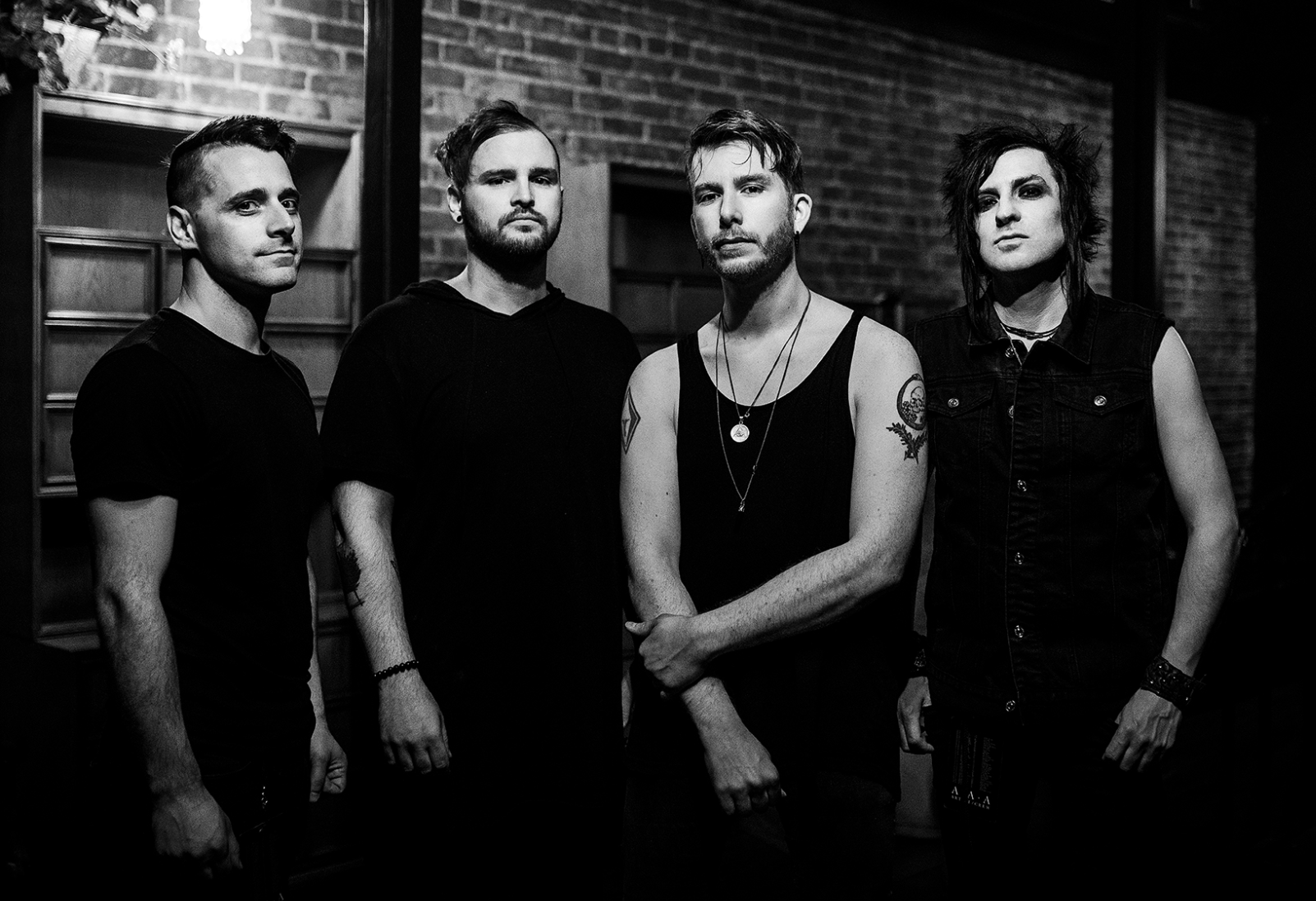
- Grendel in 2019

Background information
- Origin: Netherlands
- Genres: Electro-industrial, EBM, Aggrotech, Synthpop, Futurepop
- Years active: 1997–present
- Labels: Infacted, Metropolis, NoiTekk
- Members: JD Tucker; Ben Tourkantonis; Erik Gustafson; Neal Reed
- Past members: Anita Drost; Floris Noordman; Marco Visconti; Marc Martinez; Adam Milner; Paul James; Mel Allezbleu; Sascha Pniok

Remnants from the album Harsh Generation
This short sample shows the use of short audio samples in addition to a voice track.

Grendel is a Dutch music group formed in 1997. Their music is in the electro-industrial genre. Their name originates from the beast in Beowulf.

Not to be confused with the Finnish power metal band or Australian heavy metal band of the same name.

== History ==
Grendel was formed in 2000 by JD Tucker (aka VLRK) and released its first promo CD, which included the European dance hit, "Strangers". Soon after Grendel began receiving requests for live shows and FLRS (aka Floris Noordman) joined the band, performing live synthesizing and engineering duties. Grendel was signed by the German record label NoiTekk — a sub-division of Black Rain — which released their first studio album, Inhumane Amusement, an expanded and remastered version of their demo CD.

The End of Ages EP was released in 2002 and included remixes of the title track by Feindflug, Arzt+Pfusch and God Module.

In 2003, Grendel recorded their second full-length release, Prescription: Medicide. It was released in Europe on 15 January 2004 through NoiTekk Records and in the United States on 8 October 2004 through Metropolis Records. It was album of the month in a.o. Zillo and Orkus, and reached number 1 position for several months on the Dutch Underground Charts. It included a cover version of Zombie Nation's Kernkraft 400. Soon after the recording of this album FLRS left the band and was replaced by 4N1T4.

In 2005, Grendel recorded an EP entitled Soilbleed, including a second cover version of Kernkraft 400 entitled "Zombienation V.2k5". It was released in Europe on 25 April 2005 through NoiTekk Records, and in the United States on 5 October 2005 through Metropolis Records. Soilbleed spent seven weeks on the German Alternative Charts (DAC), peaking at #10. Problems relating to copyright clearance of the title track resulted in the re-release of the EP Soilbleed Redux, going public on 12 May 2006 in Europe through NoiTekk Records. The track in question having been replaced by a cover of Leæther Strip's "Don't Tame Your Soul." Two new tracks were also added, "One.Eight.Zero" and a remix of "One.Eight.Zero" by Life Cried. The song features heavily sampling from the movie May.

2006 saw another line up change: 4N1T4 left on amicable terms due to personal choices while M4RC (aka Marc Martinez - formerly of Terrorfakt, Manufactura and Caustic), was recruited as live drummer and MRK0 (aka Marco Visconti - of XP8) was added as a live keyboardist.

Tucker and the new members then began work on their third full-length album entitled "Harsh Generation". This album marked new territory for the band, with a more matured sound and style, gaining more support and success & taking them to the top of the genre. After its release in early 2007, this album remained on top 5 positions (peaking at no. 3) on the DAC and GEWC and remained there for maximum periods of time. Grendel spent the following years touring intensively worldwide and drawing increasingly larger audiences.

In 2009, the "Chemicals + Circuitry" EP was written and recorded. This was a slight diversion from the band's familiar sound, exploring different sounds and styles. It was released in Europe on 27 November 2009 through Infacted Recordings and in the United States on 12 January 2010 through Metropolis Records. It is the band's first album to feature non-distorted vocals. The response to their new album was positive, and Grendel again reached the top 5 position in the charts (DAC, GEWC, DUC, etc.). In 2009, MRK0 (Marco Visconti) decided to leave the band for personal reasons. He was replaced by [S42H] (aka Sascha Pniok of the band Schallfaktor), who had previously also been filling in on keyboard since late 2008.

In 2011, 4DD2 Adam Milner joined ranks with the band on electric guitar and Kitara (Misa Digital instrument). In 2012, Grendel released the "Timewave : Zero" album. This album is both a return to their signature sound and taking on various influences from contemporary EDM styles, such as Trance, Complex Electro and House. M4RC then left the band and Mel Allezbleu joined the band on keys and backing vocals. In July 2013, Grendel performed at the Amphi Festival in Cologne, Germany along with the likes of Funker Vogt, Suicide Commando and VNV Nation.

In 2014, Grendel continued to play shows across Europe, before heading to the United States for a monthlong tour for the first time in many years. Prior to the tour Adam Milner (4DD2) left to pursue other musical projects - He was replaced by Paul James on guitar. In 2015, Grendel played E-tropolis festival in Oberhausen Germany and was booked to headline at the Wave Gotik Treffen, as well as Terminus Festival in Calgary, Canada. Mid 2016 Grendel released a remaster of [Prescription : Medicide], entitled "[Prescription : Medicide] Redux". Released on 16 June. In 2017 Grendel released the "Age of the Disposable Body" album, on Infacted & Metropolis Records, which was followed up by a 34 gig tour of North America in 2018 and various European shows. In 2019 Grendel released the 'Ascending The Abyss' album on Infacted & Metropolis Records, which was preceded by a 38 gig tour of North America that same year.

== Discography ==
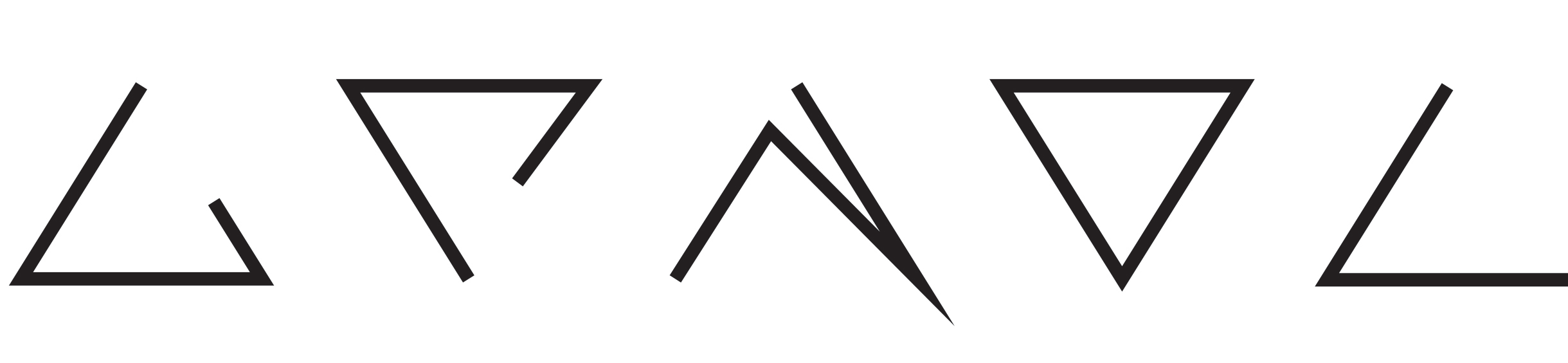
Official Grendel logo

=== Albums ===
- Inhumane Amusement (2001, NoiTekk)
- Prescription: Medicide (2004, NoiTekk) (US release: Metropolis)
- Harsh Generation (2007, Infacted Recordings) (US release: Metropolis; Russia release: Gravitator)
- Timewave Zero (2012, Infacted Recordings) (US release: Metropolis Recordings)
- Prescription: Medicide (Redux) (2016, Infacted Recordings)
- Age of the Disposable Body (2017, Infacted Recordings) (US release: Metropolis Recordings)
- Inhumane Amusement at the End of Ages (Redux) (2019, Infacted Recordings) (singular re-release of Inhumane Amusement and End of Ages)
- Ascending the Abyss (2019, Infacted Recordings)

=== EPs ===
- End of Ages (2002, NoiTekk)
- Soilbleed (2005, NoiTekk) (US release: Metropolis)
- Soilbleed Redux (2006, NoiTekk)
- Chemicals + Circuitry (2009, Infacted Recordings(EU) Metropolis Records(North America) DeathWatch Asia (Japan))
- Soilbleed Redux v2 (2014, Infacted Recordinds)

== Compilations ==
- Triton Compilation II (2xCD, Comp), "Lust", Triton 2000
- Kaskadeure Vol.1 (CD, Comp), "Lust", Error315 Records 2001
- A Compilation (CD), "Catastrophe", Black Rain 2002
- Cyberpolis - A Darker Dancefloor Vol II (2xCD), "End Of Ages (remix)", Cyberpolis 2002
- Störsequenz (CD), "No Way Out", Black Rain/NoiTekk 2002
- Triton Compilation III (2xCD, Comp), "Catastrophe", Triton 2002
- Dark Awakening Vol. 4 (2xCD, Comp), "Pax Psychosis", COP International 2003
- Music For The Masses - Visions Of Future Pop (2xCD, Smplr, Dig), "End Of Ages", BMG Ariola München GmbH 2003
- ZilloScope: New Signs & Sounds 12/03-1/04 (CD, Smplr), "Construct Construction", Zillo 2003
- Elegy Sampler 33 (CD, Smplr), "Construct Constriction", Elegy 2004
- Fiend Magazine Issue #3 (CD), "Prescription:Medicide", Fiend Magazine 2004
- Metropolis 2004 (CD, Smplr), "Crucify", Metropolis 2004
- Advanced Electronics Vol. 4 (2xCD, Comp), "Aspiration Feed", Synthetic Symphony 2005
- Bodybeats (CD, Comp), "Fatal Flaws (remix)", COP International 2005
- Cryonica Tanz V.4 (2xCD, Comp), "Soilbleed (v.3)", Cryonica Music 2005
- Different - Music Is Our Passion (DVD), "End Of Ages", Black Rain/NoiTekk 2005
- Endzeit Bunkertracks [Act 1] (4xCD + Box), "Soilbleed V2", Alfa Matrix 2005
- Metropolis 2005 (CD, Comp + DVD, NTSC, Comp), "Soilbleed (remix)", Metropolis 2005
- New Signs & Sounds 04/05 (CD, Smplr, Enh), "Aspiration Feed", Zillo 2005
- United Vol 1 (CD), "Soilbleed", NoiTekk 2005
- Zillo Club Hits 10 (CD, Dig), "Zombie Nation 2003", Zillo 2005
- Electrixmas 2007 (CD, Album, Promo, Comp), "Hate This", Electrixmas 2007
- Endzeit Bunkertracks [Act III] (4xCD, Comp, Car + Box), "Hate This (remix)", Alfa Matrix 2007
- Extreme Sündenfall 6 (2xCD, Comp), "The Judged Ones", UpScene 2007
- Fuck The Mainstream Vol. 1 (4xCD, Comp), "Void Malign (remix)", Alfa Matrix 2007
- Infactious Vol. Three (CD, Mixed, Ltd, Sli), "Hate This", Infacted Recordings 2007
- Into The Darkness Volume 5 (DVD), "Soilbleed (Live in Hamburg)", Nightclub Records 2007
- Nacht Der Maschinen Volume One (CD, Ltd), "Hate This" (remix), Infacted Recordings 2007
- New Signs & Sounds 04/07 (CD, Smplr, Enh), "Void Melign (remix)", Zillo 2007
- Noise Terror 2 - World Wide Electronics (CD, Comp), "Judged Ones (remix)", NTP/Dependent Records 2007
- Schwarze Nacht Tanz 2 (CD, Album, Comp + CD, Maxi, Comp, Ltd), "Void Malign", Upscene 2007
- Zillo Club Hits Vol. 12 (2xCD, Dig), "Hate This", Zillo 2007
- Advanced Electronics Vol. 6 (2xCD, Comp + DVD, Comp), "Hate This (remix)", Synthetic Symphony 2008
- Extreme Lustlieder 1 (CD, Comp), "Dirty", UpScene/Indigo 2008
- Infacted 4 (2xCD, Comp), "Hate This (remix)", Infacted Recordings 2008
- Metropolis:Rebirth 1.0 (2xCD, Smplr), "Harsh Generation", Metropolis 2008
- Visual Infaction Volume \ 1 (DVD, PAL, Comp), "Hate This" & "Remnants", Infacted Recordings 2008
- Gothic Spirits - EBM Edition (2xCD, Comp), "Harsh Generation", Golden Core 2009
- Kinetik Festival Volume Two (2xCD, Comp), "Soilbleed (remix)", Artoffact Records 2009
- Endzeit Bunkertracks [Act V] (4xCD, Comp), "Chemicals & Circuitry (remix)", Alfa Matrix 2010
