= Ad·ver·sary =

Canadian music project

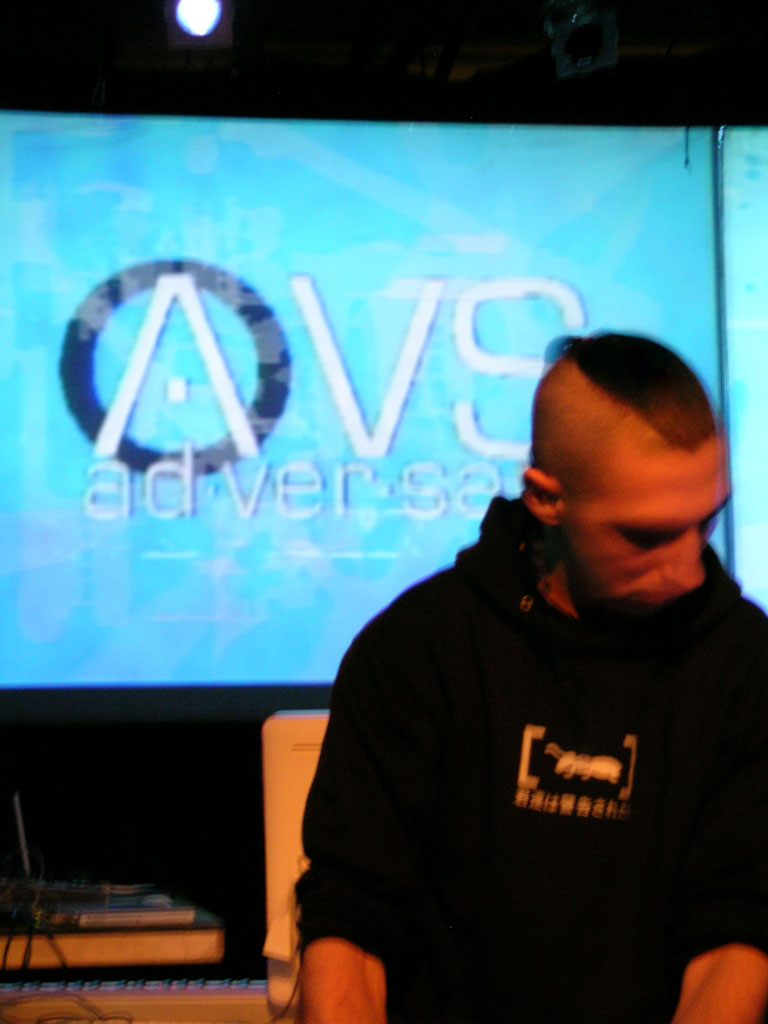
- Jairus Khan

Background information
- Origin: Canada
- Genres: Industrial
- Years active: 2005–present
- Labels: Tympanik Audio; Glitch Mode Recordings
- Members: Jairus Khan

Ad·ver·sary is an industrial music project fronted by Jairus Khan, based in Toronto, Ontario, Canada.

== History ==
In 2005, after working as a DJ, Khan released his first EP, Cyanotic vs Ad·ver·sary - Music For Jerks, as Ad·ver·sary. He later toured the United States and Canada with Iszoloscope, and has acted as tour support for Terrorfakt, Antigen Shift, and Adam X. His remix work includes material from Iszoloscope, Converter, Cyanotic and Urusai.

In 2008, Khan signed to the Tympanik Audio label to release his debut album as Ad·ver·sary, Bone Music, which was also made available as a free download under Creative Commons licensing. The album was mastered by Yann Faussurier of Iszoloscope, containing remixes by Antigen Shift, Tonikom, and Synapscape. and received generally positive reviews.

In 2009, Khan released a second album as Ad·ver·sary, A Bright Cut Across Velvet Sky.

Khan performed at the 2012 Kinetik Festival, ending his set by screening a video, We Deserve Better, which criticized headlining acts Combichrist and Nachtmahr and the industrial music genre in general, and, according to the website IdieYoudie, "openly critiques ... the use of misogynist and racist tropes in those bands' music and publicity materials".

Khan's sister is the Juno nominated artist Eternia.

== Discography ==
=== Solo ===
- Bone Music (CD, 2008)
- A Bright Cut Across Velvet Sky (CD, 2009)

=== With Cyanotic ===
- Cyanotic vs Ad·ver·sary - Music For Jerks (EP, 2005)

=== With Antigen Shift ===
- Brotherhood (CD, digital, 2014)
