= Displacer (disambiguation) =

A displacer is a piston used in some Stirling engines.

Displacer may also refer to:

- Displacer (musician)
- Displacer beast
- Displacer Serpent
