= Ludovico Technique (band) =

American gothic metal band

- Also known as: LT, Ludo Technique, The Ludovico Technique
- Origin: New York, New York, U.S.
- Genres: Electronic rock; gothic metal; industrial metal; aggrotech (early)
- Years active: 2008–present
- Labels: Metropolis; Crunch Pod; Beyond Therapy
- Members: Ben Vanlier (vocals) Evan Brito (guitar) Ben Tourkantonis (drums)
- Past members: Alejandro Acuña (drums) Kym LaRoux (e-percussion) Simon Bishop (drums) Ryan Wallace (synthesizer) Meghan Elizabeth (synthesizer)
- Website: ludotechnique.com

Ludovico Technique is an American industrial gothic metal band from New York City, New York. Formed in 2008, the band is fronted by singer, songwriter and multi-instrumental artist, Ben Vanlier The additional touring members of the band remain anonymous.

Their track "I Was" charted at #20 in the Deutsche Alternative Charts in September 2021. "Becoming Numb" reached #1 in the iTunes Metal Charts in South Africa and #18 in the iTunes Electronic charts. "Up To the Flames" reached #5 in the iTunes Rock Charts in Sweden. "Absence" debuted at #1 in the Goth Industrial Metal genre on Amazon.

"Haunted" was named one of "The Essential Halloween: Past and Present" tracks by Knotfest.

== Biography ==
Formed in 2008, Ludovico Technique derives their name from the Anthony Burgess novel, as well as the Stanley Kubrick cinematic adaptation, A Clockwork Orange. The band was formed by Ben V., original founder of Beyond Therapy Records.

In 2010 the band released their first 5-track, self-titled EP, Ludovico Technique. After this release, the band embarked on their first US tour.

In late 2011 the band signed to Metropolis Records. Ludovico Technique’s first major release was in 2012 with “Some Things Are Beyond Therapy” on Metropolis Records. Followed by extensive US and European touring In 2013, the band released their sophomore full-length “We Came To Wreck Everything”.

In 2017, after extensive touring with acts such as Leæther Strip, The Birthday Massacre and Army of the Universe, the band released their single “Absence” their most popular single to date with over 1 million streams. In 2020, the band returned and began releasing singles on a semi-monthly basis including: “Live As Myself,” “Up to the Flames,” “Embrace,” “Becoming Numb,” “Poisoned,” “Burn Everything,” “I Was,” “Haunted,” and “Noise Is Gone“. Ludovico Technique was described as "dripping with quintessential gothic darkness" and "Passionate, intelligent, and not your run of the mill modern industrial" by Metal Injection.

Grammy nominee, Stuart Hawkes, known for his work on Amy Winehouse, Lorde, and Ed Sheeran has mastered a number of Ludovico Technique's tracks, including: "Live As Myself" and "Poisoned"

In 2022, Ludovico Technique released their next full-length album, “Haunted People”.

== Musical style and influences ==
The band is described by AllMusic as a blend of electronic, gothic metal, alternative metal, and industrial metal. They have also been called industrial as well as post-punk. The group's song structure commonly features intricate riffs coupled with keyboard effects. The band’s overall sound has been stated to be “the very embodiment of the Gothic aesthetic in its purest form,” “full of nightmarish energy and devastating, electrified beauty,” and that they "showcase a thoughtful depth and complexity unmatched by many bands." Ben V. has been described as “a vocal powerhouse not afraid to experiment with sounds” Alternative Press (magazine) described their more recent singles as adding "gritty rock dimension to the eclectic, industrial–goth foundation the band have so masterfully established."

The band members themselves have stated that they are influenced from a wide variety of artists such as Skinny Puppy and The Sisters of Mercy, as well as Type O Negative, Rammstein, and Rob Zombie.

== Discography ==
Studio Albums:

- The Ludovico Technique — 2010 (Crunch Pod)
- Some Things Are Beyond Therapy — September 25, 2012 (Metropolis Records)
- We Came To Wreck Everything — November 12, 2013 (Metropolis Records)
- Haunted People — August 9, 2022

Singles:

- Absence — October 13, 2017 (Metropolis Records, Infacted Recording])
- Live as Myself - October 23, 2020
- Up to the Flames — January 15, 2021
- Embrace — February 19, 2021
- Becoming Numb — March 29, 2021
- Poisoned — May 24, 2021
- Burn Everything — September 3, 2021
- I Was — September 29, 2021
- Haunted — October 22, 2021
- Noise Is Gone — November 26, 2021
- Dreaming — February 25, 2022
- Silence — April 8, 2022

== Members ==
- Ben Vanlier - vocals
- Evan Brito - guitar (past : keyboard)
- Ben Tourkantonis - drums
- ? - bass
