= Second Circle =

Single by Finite Automata
- Released: May 1, 2015
- Recorded: Late 2014, Early 2015
- Genre: Industrial; Electronic; Glitch
- Length: 15:11
- Label: Beyond Therapy Records, Latex Records, Self Released
- Songwriter: Mod Eschar
- Producer: Mod Eschar

Finite Automata singles chronology
"Recurse" (2012)	"Second Circle" (2015)	"Machine States" (2016)

"Second Circle" is a song by American electro-industrial band Finite Automata. It was released on May 1, 2015 by the band as a self-release in digital format, and licensed to Beyond Therapy Records. The track is a reference to the Second Circle of Hell according to Dante's Inferno, and deals with the concept of perversion and blind lust as a means of control. Originally intended as the first single off of the band's follow up album to their 2012 release, Recurse, it is now considered a stand alone release by the band. The record was re-released on Latex Records in 2016 following Beyond Therapy Records' dissolution.

== Recording ==
"Second Circle" was originally written in 2011; approximately the same time Finite Automata was finishing up their debut release, Here Won No One and rehashing material for Recurse. However, at the time, producer and front-man Mod Eschar did not believe the song fit stylistically with the current releases, and shelved it for release on the next album. Despite not having been released until 2015, the song has been part of the band's live show since 2011. Like its predecessor, the release was again mastered by Eric Sochocki of Becoming the Devourer and Cryogen Second, however unlike previous releases, the single was also mixed by Sochocki as well.

== Track listing ==
=== Beyond Therapy Records Release ===
No.	Title	Length
1.	"Second Circle"	4:30
2.	"Rot Inside (Decomposed Mix)"	6:11
3.	"Rot Inside (No Recourse Mix) (Flammpunkt vs. Finite Automata)"	4:30
Total length:		15:11

=== Latex Records Release ===
No.	Title	Length
1.	"Second Circle"	4:30
2.	"Second Circle (Machines On Blast Remix)"	3:34
3.	"Rot Inside (Decomposed Mix)"	6:11
4.	"Rot Inside (No Recourse Mix) (Flammpunkt vs. Finite Automata)"	4:30
Total length:		18:46

== Personnel ==
- Mod Eschar - Lyrics, Vocals, Arrangement, Sampler
- Mat Syn - Keyboards, Noises, Gadgetry
- Eric Sochocki - Mixing, Mastering
- Frank Sparti - Remix, Mastering [track 3]
