= Cyborg Attack =

German electro-industrial and ebm band

- Origin: Chemnitz, Germany
- Genres: Electro-industrial; EBM
- Years active: 1995–2010
- Labels: NoiTekk; Black Rain; Omp
- Members: Tino Weidauer; Uwe Schimmel; Sandro Franz
- Past members: Raik Wild
- Website: www.cyborg-attack.de

Cyborg Attack was a German electro-industrial and EBM band, formed in 1995 by Tino Weidaue and Raik Wild. They released 2 studio albums and 1 EP.

== History ==
Cyborg Attack was formed in 1995 by Tino Weidaue (keyboards) and Raik Wild (vocals), with the subsequent incorporation of Uwe Schimmel in 1996 as additional keyboardist. Sandro Franz replaced Raik Wild as singer in 1999. During their lifespan they released 2 studio albums and 1 EP with German record labels Black Rain, NoiTekk and Omp. The band's songs have also appeared on more than 20 different compilations.

The group participated in the Wave-Gotik-Treffen music festival in 2000, 2004 and 2008.

== Style and themes ==
Cyborg Attack's musical style has generally been described as old school EBM with metal influence. The band's motto "Resistance is futile" is a reference to the Borg, an alien group that appear as recurring antagonists in the Star Trek franchise.

== Members ==
- Tino Weidauer – keyboards (1995–2010)
- Raik Wild – vocals (1995–1999)
- Uwe Schimmel – production (1996–2010)
- Sandro Franz – vocals (1999–2010)

== Discography ==
=== Studio albums ===
- Blutgeld (2001)
- Stoerf***tor (2006)

=== EPs ===
- Toxic (1998)

== See also ==
- List of electro-industrial bands
