= Timewave Zero (Grendel album) =

Studio album by Grendel
- Released: 20 April 2012
- Genres: Aggrotech, Futurepop
- Labels: Infacted Rec. (EU); Metropolis (US)

Grendel chronology
| Chemicals + Circuitry (2009) | Timewave Zero (2012) |

Professional ratings
Review scores
| Source | Rating |
|---|---|
| COMA Music Magazine | (Favorable) |

Timewave Zero is the fourth album release by Dutch Aggrotech band, Grendel. It was released in Europe on 20 April 2012 through Infacted Recordings and in the United States through Metropolis Records. It features a re-recorded version of their 2009 track "Chemicals + Circuitry". The track 'Deep Waters' features Dutch singer Lis van den Akker from Dutch act Misery. A music video was released for Timewave Zero on YouTube.

== Track listing ==
| No. | Title | Length |
|---|---|---|
| 1. | "Rise" | 3:09 |
| 2. | "Conflict Instigation" | 5:48 |
| 3. | "Timewave Zero" | 5:02 |
| 4. | "EPR // EDP" | 5:02 |
| 5. | "Wheels in Motion" | 6:45 |
| 6. | "Out of My Mind" | 5:43 |
| 7. | "Deep Waters" (feat. Lis van den Akker) | 5:12 |
| 8. | "Neon City Nights" | 7:37 |
| 9. | "Chemicals + Circuitry" (v. 2012) | 5:22 |
| 10. | "Fall" | 2:31 |

Limited Edition Bonus Disc
| No. | Title | Length |
|---|---|---|
| 1. | "Conflict Instigation" (Aesthetic Perfection Remix) | 4:27 |
| 2. | "Conflict Instigation" (Siva Six Remix) | 5:32 |
| 3. | "Conflict Instigation" (Terrolokaust Remix) | 6:06 |
| 4. | "Timewave Zero" (Shiv-R Remix) | 5:35 |
| 5. | "Timewave Zero" (Modulate Remix) | 4:47 |
| 6. | "Timewave Zero" (C-Lekktor Remix) | 4:26 |
| 7. | "Out of My Mind" (Vindicare Remix) | 5:09 |
| 8. | "Out of My Mind" (Freakangel Remix) | 4:18 |
| 9. | "Out of My Mind" (XP8 Remix) | 5:50 |
| 10. | "EPR // EDP" (Manufactura Remix) | 5:38 |
| 11. | "EPR // EDP" (Dym Remix) | 4:14 |
| 12. | "Deep Waters" (Aqualite Remix) | 4:53 |
| 13. | "Deep Waters" (Consumer Junk Remix) | 5:51 |
| 14. | "Wheels in Motion" (AR-12 Remix) | 4:28 |
| 15. | "Wheels in Motion" (Symbiote Remix) | 6:52 |
