= Cygnosic =

Greek electronic music project by Georgios Psaroudakis

- Origin: Athens, Greece
- Genres: Dark electro, electro-industrial, EBM
- Years active: 2006–present
- Labels: DWA, Black Rain, BLC Productions
- Members: Georgios Psaroudakis
- Website: www.cygnosic.gr

Cygnosic (pronounced /saɪɡˈnəʊsɪk/), stylized CYGNOSIC (backward "C" at the end), is a Greek electronic music project created by musician and programmer, Georgios Psaroudakis (Greek: Γεώργιος Ψαρουδάκης). His music is associated with musical genres including Dark Electro/Industrial/EBM. The music is recognizable and consists of characteristic melodic sounds combined with death metal vocals. The studio project is a one-man operation based in Athens, Greece.

== History ==
=== Formation and early years ===
Cygnosic first appeared as a music act in late 2006 on MySpace. In 2007, the band was discovered by Brandon L. Clark, manager of the Industrial Music Label BLC Productions based in Little Rock, Arkansas. He offered Cygnosic an album deal. During 2008, Georg Psaroudakis recorded his first album with sound engineer Dimitris Douvras of Lunatech Sounds Studio. In early 2009, the debut album A Deity In Pain was released and distributed by Metropolis Records of in North America and by E-Noxe in Europe. After a year, BLC Productions terminated its operations and released its artists from their contracts.

During 2010, Cygnosic started performing electronic concerts around Greece while writing his second album. While samples of the second album were sent to all major Dark Electro/Industrial labels, Cygnosic got rediscovered by Jamie Nova, manager of DWA (Digital World Audio, former Deathwatch Asia), an electronic music label based in Osaka, Japan. After an introductory EP release, the second album titled Fallen was released in 2011.

=== Later ===
In 2013, the third studio album titled Fire And Forget was released in two versions, a European one by the German label Black Rain and an international one by DWA. Cygnosic started touring in Russia, United Kingdom and the rest of the Europe to promote the album.

In 2014, Psaroudakis returned to the studio to write his fourth eponymous album, a double album consisting of one electronic set and one metal set. The metal set included metal versions of selected electro tracks picked from his earlier albums. Psaroudakis played the drums, bass, guitars, keyboards and vocals. The electronic set was released prior to the full album version. Orkus magazine printed 62,000 copies in its twentieth anniversary issue. In 2015, an EP titled The Key[s] was released in vinyl. In 2016, after a series of European concerts, the fifth album, Siren, was in process with the support of a crowdfunding campaign. It was released in DigiBook in 2017.

Cygnosic has done remixes for other bands and was remixed by other bands more than 90 times. It has performed in concerts around the world and appeared in festivals including WGT (Leipzig (Germany)), Summer Darkness (Utrecht Netherlands), Resistanz (Sheffield UK).

== Discography ==
=== Studio albums ===
- A Deity In Pain (2009)
- Fallen (2011)
- Fire And Forget (2013)
- Cygnosic (2015) which consists of 2 albums: Disc/LP A: Pitch Black (Electronic album), Disc/LP B: Snow White (Metal Versions of selected Cygnosic tracks)
- Siren (2017)
- Epiphany (2019)
- Demystify (2023)

=== EPs and singles ===
- One Step Forward (2011)
- Crawl (2014)
- The Key[s] (2016)
- Oceans of Time (2019)

=== Reissues of sold out albums ===
- A Deity In Pain Reborn (2012)
- Fire And Forget Memorial Edition (2015)
- Fire And Forget Extended Version (2017)
- Cygnosic Extended Edition - Electronic Music disc only (2018)

=== Music videos ===
- "As We Approach The End" (2013)
- "This Is The Night" (2013)
- "Light" (2014)
- "The Key" (2016)
- "Blindfold - White" (2016)
- "Oceans Of Time" (2019)
