= Bi (Astyplaz album) =

Studio album by Astyplaz
- Released: May 27, 2008
- Genre: Pop - electronica
- Label: EMI, LMusic
- Producer: Astyplaz

Astyplaz chronology
Name Your Slippers (2005)	Bi (2008)

Bi is the second album by Athenian pop/electronica band Astyplaz.

== Track listing ==
1. Hey
2. Bi-
3. I Can See You Fade
4. Zaira
5. No Sin No Shame (featuring Akis Boyatzis)
6. An Endless Rewind
7. Let's Get Rolling (Pop 'n' Roll)
8. Private Flight
9. Time (featuring Carbonated Lemonade)
10. 116.99
11. A Moment To Say Goodbye
12. 116.99 (Serafim Tsotsonis mix)
