= Stendeck =

Electronic music act

Background information
- Origin: Switzerland
- Genres: Industrial, IDM, electronica, big beat
- Years active: 1999–present
- Labels: Hymen Records; Tympanik Audio; Geska Records
- Members: Alessandro Zampieri

Stendeck is an electronic music act fronted by Alessandro Zampieri (born June 14, 1977), and is heavily associated with the industrial music scene. Zampieri is a classically trained pianist, forming Stendeck in 1999 as part of a growing interest in electronic music. In 2002 he made his first demo album, A crash into another world, which was very well received in his native Switzerland. Stendeck's current sound, marked by ambience, distorted beats and noisy keys with acoustic instruments was developed while working on his 2005 album Can you hear my call?. It was released by Geska Records and was mastered by Mike Wells of Gridlock. After the release of Faces in 2007, also on Geska Records, Stendeck switched to Tympanik Audio for his next album, Sonnambula (2009).

The name Stendeck is a variation of "stendec", the final strange Morse code radio message sent by the plane Star Dust on August 2, 1947, before its disappearance. An electronic music act called Stendec, unrelated to Stendeck, released an album in 2004.

== Discography ==
=== Full length albums and EPs ===
- A crash into another world (2002)
- Can you hear my call? (2005)
- Faces (2007)
- Sonnambula (2009)
- Scintilla (2011)
- Folgor (2015)
- Carnage (2021)
- Somewhere nobody knows (2021)

=== Compilation appearances ===
- A.L.P.H.A. (2005)
- New Input Noise (2006)
- The Other Side (2006)
- IBM Vol. 3 (2006)
- Hyperreality (2007)
- Emerging Organisms (2007)
- Elektroanschlag 4 (2008)
- Emerging Organisms 2 (2008)
- Approach Lights (2009)
- Electronic Manifesto 4 (2010)
- Emerging Organisms 4 (2011)
- Accretion (2012)
- Hypotaxia (2016)
- Document (2019)
- KATHARSIS (2020)

=== Remixes ===
- Autoclav1.1 – Visitor Attractions (2006)
- HIV+ – Overdose Kill me EP (2006)
- Technoir – Deliberately Fragile (2007)
- Zentriert ins Antlitz – NO (2008)
- Ad·ver·sary – A Bright Cut Across Velvet Sky (2009)
- ESA – The Immaculate Manipulation (2009)
- Memmaker – How To Enlist in a Robot Uprising (2010)
- Architect – Upload Select Remix (2011)
- Sleepwalk – Nibiru (2012)
- Black Lung – Hype & Drive (2014)

=== Soundtracks ===
- FinisLanda Original Score (2006)
