= Cipher Method =

Studio album by Negative Format
- Released: 2003
- Genre: Electronic Industrial
- Length: 68:00
- Label: Sector 9 Studios

Negative Format chronology
''Static'' (2002)	Cipher Method (2003)	''Moving Past The Boundaries'' (2005)

Cipher Method is Negative Format's fourth CD. The album was built with complex beat and rhythm structures, mixing Negative Format's trance melodies with dark atmospheric overtones, and a mixture of vocoded and EBM vocal passages.

== Track listing ==
1. "Cipher"
2. "Automate"
3. "Transfer"
4. "Schema"
5. "Algorythm"
6. "Senseless"
7. "Vertex"
8. "Static"
9. "Encryption"
10. "Downfall (atmosphere)"
11. "Packet Filter"
