= Finite Automata (band) =

American band

- Origin: Atlanta, Georgia, U.S.
- Genres: Post-industrial; Electro industrial Industrial rock Dark ambient
- Years active: 2006–present
- Labels: Latex, Beyond Therapy
- Members: Mod Eschar; Scott Storey
- Past members: c. Grendel; Mat Syn; Vic Martinez; Damian Turner; Miranda Pixley (live); Sidney Pirata (live); Timothy Miller (live)
- Website: finiteautomata.net

Finite Automata is an American dark electronic and electro industrial music group from Atlanta, Georgia. Originally formed in Pensacola, Florida in 2006, they have been based out of Atlanta, Georgia since 2013 and currently consist of vocalist, producer, and lyricist Mod Eschar, keyboardist Scott Storey, and guitarist Timothy Miller. They are known for their deep layered sound, frequent experimental live use of sound making devices such as radios and tapedecks, and their highly politically charged, confrontational, and theatrical stage performances. The group's name stems from the computer science concept of finite-state machines, used as a metaphor for the predictability of human behavior. The band cites 1980s and 1990s electro-industrial groups Skinny Puppy, Front Line Assembly, and Project Pitchfork as their primary influences. Much of their early work has been referred to as a "throwback" as much of its style is reminiscent of early electro-industrial as opposed to the more recent and popular Aggrotech offshoot. Their more recent work draws heavily on industrial rock and the darker and more experimental sounds of second and third generation industrial like with previous releases, but with a healthy dose of modern production stylings and a more updated sound.

== History ==
Finite Automata is the product of a project started in 2006 by musician, programmer, and visual artist Mod Eschar (Dominique Price), as an attempt to create a sound similar to 80s electro industrial. The band's original focus was more on stage performance than music. In 2008, Eschar was joined by keyboardist c. Grendel (Christopher Stanley) and later by musician Mat Syn (Mathew Porter). Since that time the band's member roster has had several lineup changes, with Eschar the only founding member still active with the group.

=== Here Won No One ===
In 2010, a chance conversation with Ben V of the Ludovico Technique resulted in the band being invited to play Beyond Therapy's annual Florida Underground Industrial Music Festival. After several years of playing regionally they were picked up by Beyond Therapy Records in 2011 and released their first EP Here Won No One on that label. The release was met with criticism regarding its amateur production quality but was praised for its "return to roots" feel. In April 2012, the band co-headlined the week long "Medical Meat" tour with Atlanta-based Prognosis, in support of the release.

=== Recurse ===
Finite Automata released their first full length studio album Recurse on Beyond Therapy Records in December 2012. The release contains material written and recorded between 2007 and 2010 by Eschar and c. Grendel. Three months after the release of Recurse the band announced c. Grendel's amicable departure as a permanent member of Finite Automata, citing family obligations and his inability to tour as his primary reasons for leaving the group. Miranda Pixley, who had been the band's keyboardist during the band's Medical Meat Tour, was drafted as his tentative replacement. It was also announced that Eschar and Syn had already begun work on the followup to Recurse, entitled Dogma Eye as well as the imminent release of a single from the upcoming album. In April 2014, musician Scott Storey, formerly of Atlanta-based groups Skabdriver and Voodoo Velkro, joined as Finite Automata's permanent keyboardist.

In November 2014, Mat Syn was removed from the list of active members on the group's social media sites. Eschar has since confirmed that Mat Syn is no longer a member of Finite Automata for unspecified reasons, but later added that Syn was ejected from the group because of his conduct.

=== Second Circle, Machine States, and Dogma Eye ===
Finite Automata released Second Circle, intended as the first single off of their follow up full length to Recurse, entitled Dogma Eye in May 2015; however the single is now considered standalone. The band later re-released the single on Latex Records the following year.

In January 2016, instrumentalist Damian Turner of Atlanta-based Ectoproxy joined the group briefly and contributed to the new record. Later that year, the group embarked on a thirteen city tour supporting God Module in support of their split EP; Machine States, with EctoProxy; after which Turner split with the group to focus on EctoProxy. In November 2016, the group set out on a week long U.S. East Coast tour with Dismantled, with guitarist Timothy Miller of Cursed Earth Corporation as live support.

In 2017, Beyond Therapy Records unexpectedly went out of business and dropped all bands from its roster without notice, including Finite Automata. That September, Finite Automata again joined God Module and Blakk Glass for the west coast leg of their "Does This Stuff Freak You Out?" Tour.

== Members ==
=== Current members ===
- Mod Eschar – vocals, programming, producer, live percussion and sampling
- Scott Storey – synth, keyboards

=== Past members ===
- Timothy Miller – live guitars (2016–2017)
- c. Grendel (2007–2013)
- Mat Syn (2007, 2010–2014)
- Vic Martinez (2008–2009) [live]
- Damian Turner (2016) [live/studio]
- Miranda Pixley (2012,2013) [live]
- Sidney Pirata (2015) [live]

== Discography ==
- Studio Albums
  - Recurse (2012)
  - Dogma Eye (TBA)
- EPs and Singles
  - Here Won No One (2011)
  - Second Circle (2015)
- Split EPs
  - Machine States (w/ EctoProxy) (2016)
- Remixes
  - Die Sektor "Beneath" (2013)
  - MyParasites "ParaNOID" (2014)
- Covers
  - Obsession, by Animotion, featured on Tainted Candy Vol 2; released on Coma Music Magazine.

== Tours ==
Headlining

- Medical Meat Tour (Midwest/Southeast US, 2012) co-headlining with PROGNOSIS

Support

- God Module
  - eVISCERAte Tour (Eastern/Midwest US, 2016)
  - "Does This Stuff Freak You Out?" Tour (Western US, 2017)
- Dismantled
  - Hero Tour (Eastern US, 2016)
