= Tympanik Audio =

- Founded: 2007
- Founder: Paul Nielsen
- Defunct: 2016
- Genre: Electronic
- Country of origin: U.S.
- Location: Chicago, Illinois
- Official website: tympanikaudio.com

Tympanik Audio was an independent record label, launched in September of 2007. Tympanik ceased operating on February 29, 2016.

== Catalogue ==
Title	Artist	Cat No	Year
Emerging Organisms	Various artists	TA001	2007
The Rake's Progress	Unterm Rad	TA002	2007
eLekatota: The Other Side of the Tracks	Totakeke	TA003	2008
Approach	Subheim	TA004	2008
Cloned: Other Side of Evolution	Disharmony	TA005	2008
Bone Music	Ad·ver·sary	TA006	2008
Circumsounds	Flint Glass	TA007	2008
The Witching Hour	Displacer	TA008	2008
ko·mor·bid	Pneumatic Detach	TA009	2008
Gravedigger	Lucidstatic	TA010	2008
Carbon	Endif	TA011	2008
Love No Longer Lives Here	Autoclav1.1	TA012	2008
Rise	Integral	TA013	2008
The Institute of Random Events	Tapage	TA014	2008
Forgotten on the Other Side of the Tracks	Totakeke	TA015	2008
Surge	Aphorism	TA016	2009
...No	Zentriert Ins Antlitz	TA017	2008
The Sea & The Silence	ESA	TA018	2008
Severed	Broken Fabiola	TA019	2008
Emerging Organisms Vol.2	Various artists	TA020	2008
Sonnambula	Stendeck	TA021	2009
Epiphora	SE	TA022	2009
The Things That Disappear When I Close My Eyes	Totakeke	TA023	2009
Fallen Clouds	Tapage	TA024	2009
A Bright Cut Across Velvet Sky	Ad·ver·sary	TA025	2009
Black Brothel	Pandora's Black Book	TA026	2009
Where Once Were Exit Wounds	Autoclav1.1	TA027	2009
Full Spectrum Dominance	Black Lung	TA028	2009
Evolution	Disharmony	TA029	2009
Plastic	[Haven]	TA030	2009
Oppidan	Access to Arasaka	TA031	2009
X Was Never Like This…	Displacer	TA032	2009
Return To Childhood	Undermathic	TA033	2009
The Immaculate Manipulation	ESA	TA034	2009
Nothing Lasts	Opposite Exhale	TA035	2009
Emerging Organisms Vol. 3	Various artists	TA036	2009
The Muse In The Machine	Candle Nine	TA037	2010
Blood	Fractional	TA038	2010
L36	SE	TA039	2010
64 Light Years Away	Geomatic	TA040	2010
Turbulences	Zeller	TA041	2010
Symbiont Underground	Lucidstatic	TA042	2010
On the First of November	Totakeke	TA043	2010
I Will Wait	Anklebiter	TA044	2010
void()	Access To Arasaka	TA045	2010
Autumn Fields	Dirk Geiger	TA046	2010
10:10PM	Undermathic	TA047	2010
Conclusion	C.H. District	TA048	2010
All Standing Room In The Goodnight Saloon	Autoclav1.1	TA049	2010
Etched In Salt	Tapage & Meander	TA050	2010
Nature's Twin Tendencies	Famine	TA051	2010
Scintilla	Stendeck	TA052	2011
Night Gallery	Displacer	TA053	2011
Queue	Anklebiter	TA054	2011
