= Name Your Slippers =

Studio album by Astyplaz
- Released: September 27, 2005
- Genre: Synthpop
- Length: 62:53
- Label: LMusic
- Producer: Astyplaz, George Priniotakis

Astyplaz chronology
Name Your Slippers (2005)	Bi (2008)

Name Your Slippers is the debut album by Athenian pop/electronica band Astyplaz. It was released in 2005 on LMusic.

== Track listing ==
1. "Just Intro"
2. "Toybox"
3. "Tous Les Jours" (Radio Edit) *
4. "Future Science"
5. "Lifting Shadows From The Sand"
6. "Spreading Life"
7. "Shattered Mould"
8. "Lost In The City"
9. "What It Feels Like"
10. "Knell Of The Dunes"
11. "There Is No Justice Baby"
12. "Dejection"
13. "Prey"
14. "Walking In My Shoes" (Bonus) **
15. "Alyto Enigma" (Bonus)

All Songs written by P. Dreamweaver (except ** written by Martin L. Gore.)
All Lyrics written by Dioni (except * written by Yiannis Koukakis, ** written by Martin L. Gore.)

== Reviews ==
www.side-line.com review (9|10)
www.machinistmusic.net review (8/10)
www.pop-rock.gr review (8/10)
www.avopolis.gr review (3.5|5)
fugues.com review
