= Negative Format =

US Electronic Body Music and trance band

- Origin: Florida
- Genres: Trance; Electronic body music; Electro-industrial
- Years active: 1996–present
- Labels: Metropolis; Gashed!; Zoth Ommog; Sector 9 Studios
- Spinoffs: The Parallel Project; Distraub
- Members: Alex Matheu; Rashree Matson; Brian Matson
- Past members: Ben Schingel
- Website: www.negativeformat.com

Negative Format is an EBM/trance band formed by Alex Matheu in 1996. For live performances, the band includes Rashree Patram and Brian Matson.

Early releases by the band were self-released and exhibited a more EBM and dance industrial sound. The second album, Result of a New Culture, was released by Zoth Ommog and Gashed and turned more towards a trance music sound which guided the direction of subsequent releases. After becoming frustrated working with various labels, Matheu formed Sector 9 Studios in 2002 along with Jasyn Bangert of God Module.

In 2000, the band toured the US with Flesh Field, God Module, and Cenobita.

In 2004, Alex created The Parallel Project, an album combining his music with the vocals of other industrial artists, including Salva Maine, Sandrine Gouriou, Ned Kirby, Tom Shear, Rashree Patram, Daniel Myer, Jennifer Parkin, Clint Carney, Darrin Huss, Courtney Bangert, Victoria Lloyd, Mark Jackson, Kristy Venrick, and G. Wygonik. In 2000, he released a song on Inception Records compilation 'Counterbalance Vol. 1' as Parallel titled Parallax featuring Ben Schingel and Daniel Paradise, this song was a precursor to The Parallel Project.

Negative Format created numerous remixes for bands such as Informatik, Aïboforcen, Psyche, Bruderschaft, Assemblage 23, and others.

Since 2008 Matheu also creates IDM under the moniker Distraub.

== Discography ==
=== Albums ===
- Pathologic Syndrome (Hypnotic Trancez, May 1997)
- Result of a New Culture (Gashed!, November 1998; Zoth Ommog, April 1999) – #16 CMJ RPM Charts
- Distant Pulses (Gashed!, May 2000) – #17 CMJ RPM Charts
- Static (Sector 9 Studios, July 2002)
- UTurn: An Exploration In Trance (with Massiv in Mensch, Artoffact Records, 2002)
- Cipher Method (Out Of Line, Sector 9 Studios, February 2003)
- Moving Past The Boundaries (Metropolis Records, September 2005)
- Gradients (Metropolis Records, April 2008)

=== Singles and EPs ===
- The Ritual of the Machine (Hypnotic Trancez, 1996)
- Random Diversions (Hypnotic Trancez, 1997)
- Static (Out Of Line, Sector 9 Studios, 2002)
- "Axiom" (Sector 9 Studios, 2012)

=== Compilations ===
- "Gaia's Will" appears on "Sonic Assault - Zombie Commandos From Hell" (2002)
- "Pathogen" appears on "Industrial Attack Vol.1" (2008)
- "Photon Ring" appears on "Industrial Attack Vol.2"(2008)
