= Necessary Response =

American musician

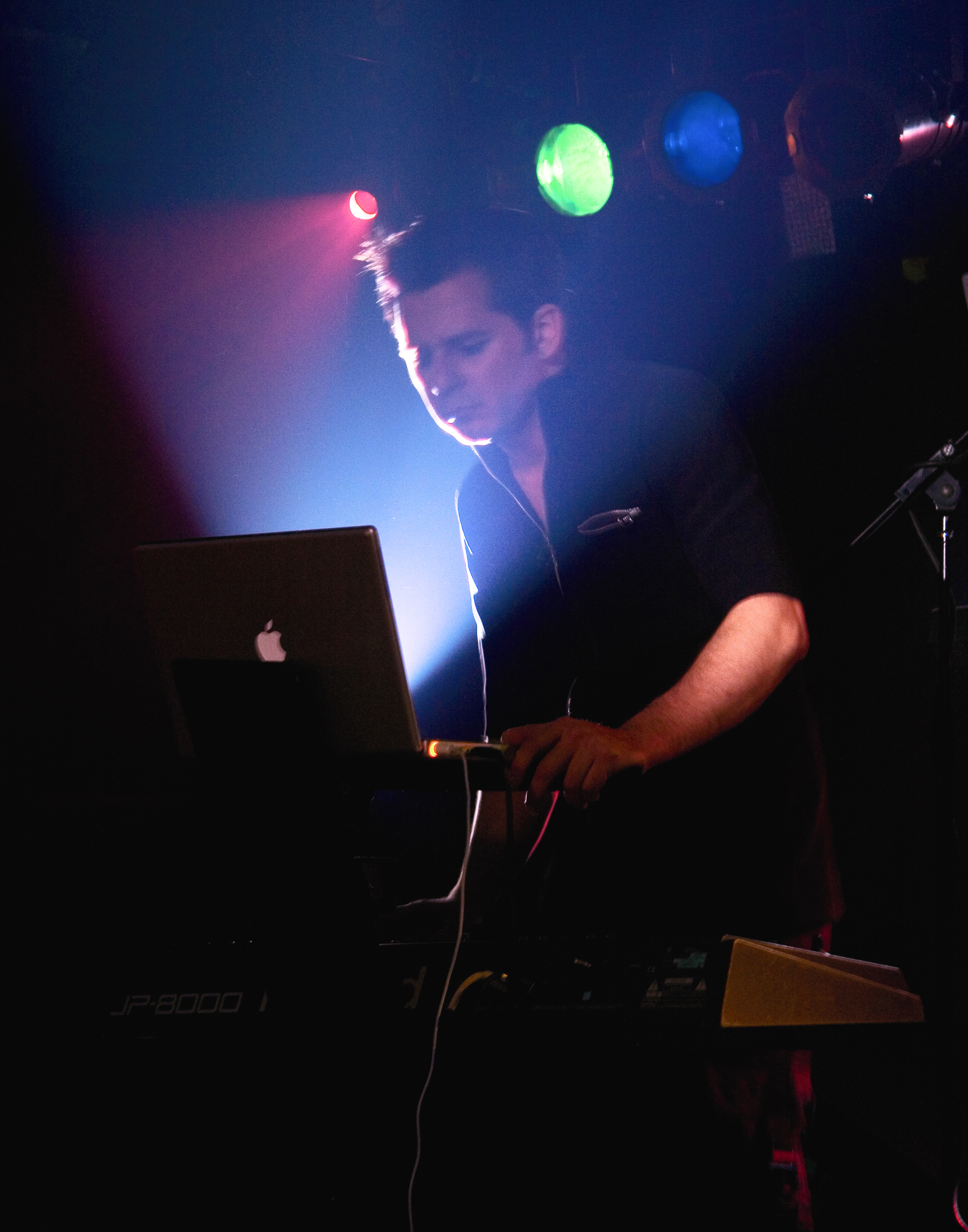
- Necessary Response in Salt Lake City, UT, 2008, supporting De/Vision

Background information
- Origin: Los Angeles, California
- Genres: Electro, Futurepop
- Years active: 2000 – 2009
- Labels: Out of Line (Europe); Bractune (US)
- Spinoff of: Aesthetic Perfection
- Members: Daniel Graves
- Website: Official MySpace

Necessary Response was an electronic musical project created by Daniel Graves. According to Graves, the songs were produced from tracks which did not fit into the format of his other project, Aesthetic Perfection.

Beginning in early 2005, a forum thread on side-line.com even featured a short debate on the identity of band members spurred by fan interest in the band. Previously, Machineries of Joy Vol. 3, a compilation from industrial/EBM label Out of Line, was released containing the track "Forever." At the time, there were no online sources which could provide information on the band. Fans on the side-line.com forum expressed interest in the artist, but no one could initially provide information on the identity of the person or persons involved with the project.

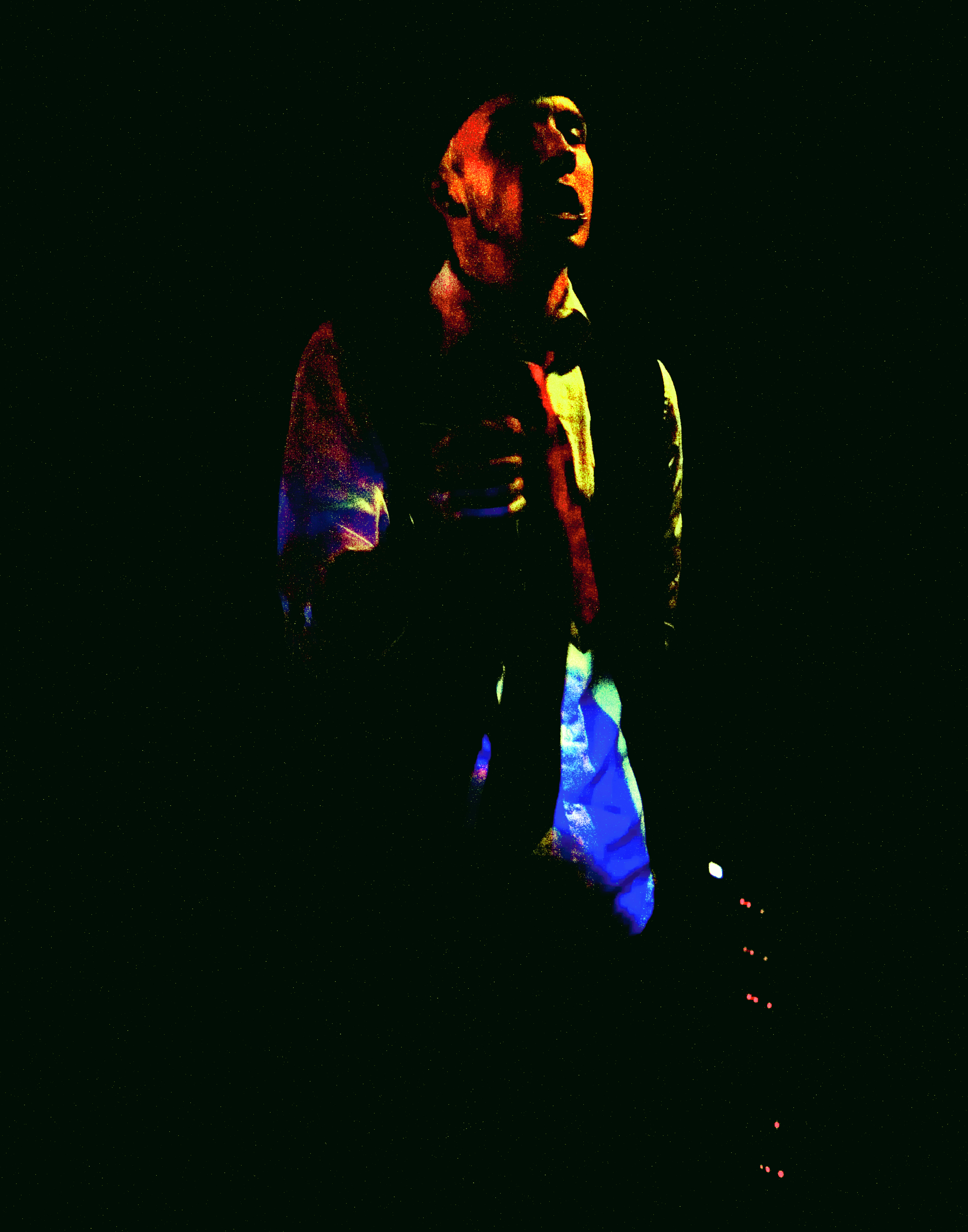
Necessary Response in Salt Lake City, UT, 2008, supporting De/Vision.

The name of the project, a play on the name of the band Imperative Reaction, was chosen as a result of an inside joke between Graves and a friend while also describing Graves' "musical situation at the time." Graves created a MySpace account for Necessary Response using a false identity and location in Southern Sweden in an attempt to distance himself from the project and spark more interest. As a result, Graves was able to temporarily keep his identity a secret. Shortly before announcing the release date of the debut album, Graves added his own name and location to the bands' MySpace page and publicly admitted to being the artist behind the project.

On March 16, 2007 (coincidentally Graves' birthday) Blood Spills Not Far From the Wound was released, and in February 2008, Necessary Response toured the U.S. promoting the album and supporting synthpop act De/Vision.

On April 22, 2009, Daniel Graves posted a blog entry on the Necessary Response MySpace page effectively ending the project in order to focus on Aesthetic Perfection. That same year, Necessary Response performed their final concert at the Kinetik Festival in Montreal.

On September 13, 2012, the official Aesthetic Perfection Facebook page posted: "I wish there was a way to telepathically project, to everyone, that Necessary Response is dead, buried, and will not return... ever."

On October 16, 2015 Daniel Graves released Blood Spills Not Far From The Wound under The Aesthetic Perfection Banner. This reissue features updated vocals, and a completely new mix. Daniel will continue to perform these revamped Necessary Response songs during Aesthetic Perfection concerts.

== Discography ==
Releases

Title	Details	Label	Year
Blood Spills Not Far From the Wound	CD, Album	Out of Line Records (Germany)/Bractune Records (United States)	2007

Remixes of other artists

Title	Details	Track title	Artist	Released By	Year
Lucifer (Purgatory)	CD, Single	Lucifer (Necessary Response Remix)	Blutengel	Out of Line	2007
Durch Fremde Hand	CD, Remix Album	Blutrot (Quiet Heart Remix)	L'Âme Immortelle	Trisol	2008

Compilations

Title	Details	Track title	Label	Year
Machineries of Joy Vol. 3	2xCD, Limited	Forever	Out of Line	2004
Awake the Machines Vol. 5	2xCD, Limited	Tomorrow (Edit)	Out Of Line	2005
Extreme Sündenfall 6	2xCD	Vapor	Indigo	2007
Machineries Of Joy Vol. 4	2xCD, Limited	Spilling Blood	Out Of Line	2007
Sonic Seducer Cold Hands Seduction Vol. 69	2xCD	Tomorrow	Sonic Seducer	2007
Das Bunker 4: Brighter Than A Thousand Suns	2xCD	Forever (Solitary Experiments Remix)	Das Bunker	2008
