= Access to Arasaka =

Rob Lioy
- Origin: Rochester, New York
- Genres: Electronic, Ambient, IDM, Glitch, Downtempo
- Years active: 2006–present
- Labels: illphabetik, Tympanik Audio, CRL Studios
- Website: www.accesstoarasaka.com

Rob Lioy, known as Access to Arasaka, is an American electronic musician from Rochester, New York.

== Style ==
Started as a DJ mostly focused on progressive house and drum'n'bass, he then switched to ambient and IDM, got influenced by Autechre (especially their album Amber), Brothomstates, Venetian Snares, Boards of Canada, Orbital and The Future Sound of London.

Nowadays the artist describes his music as "a mixture of every influence I’ve ever had, past and present. As the general idea of this project is a way to describe the future I anticipate, the sounds and styles themselves are an homage to every song that has already taken me there".

== Discography ==
=== Albums ===
- 2007 METAX
- 2009 Oppidan
- 2010 void();
- 2011 Geosynchron
- 2017 Reports from the Abyss
- 2021 l a k e s

=== Singles and EPs ===
- 2006 Korova
- 2007 A Sky Now Starless
- 2007 Cassiopeia
- 2007 Vessel
- 2007 :Port
- 2010 ==null
- 2011 Orbitus
- 2011 Aleph
- 2013 Écrasez l'infâme
- 2021 telinit 6
