= Astyplaz =

Greek electronica/synthpop group

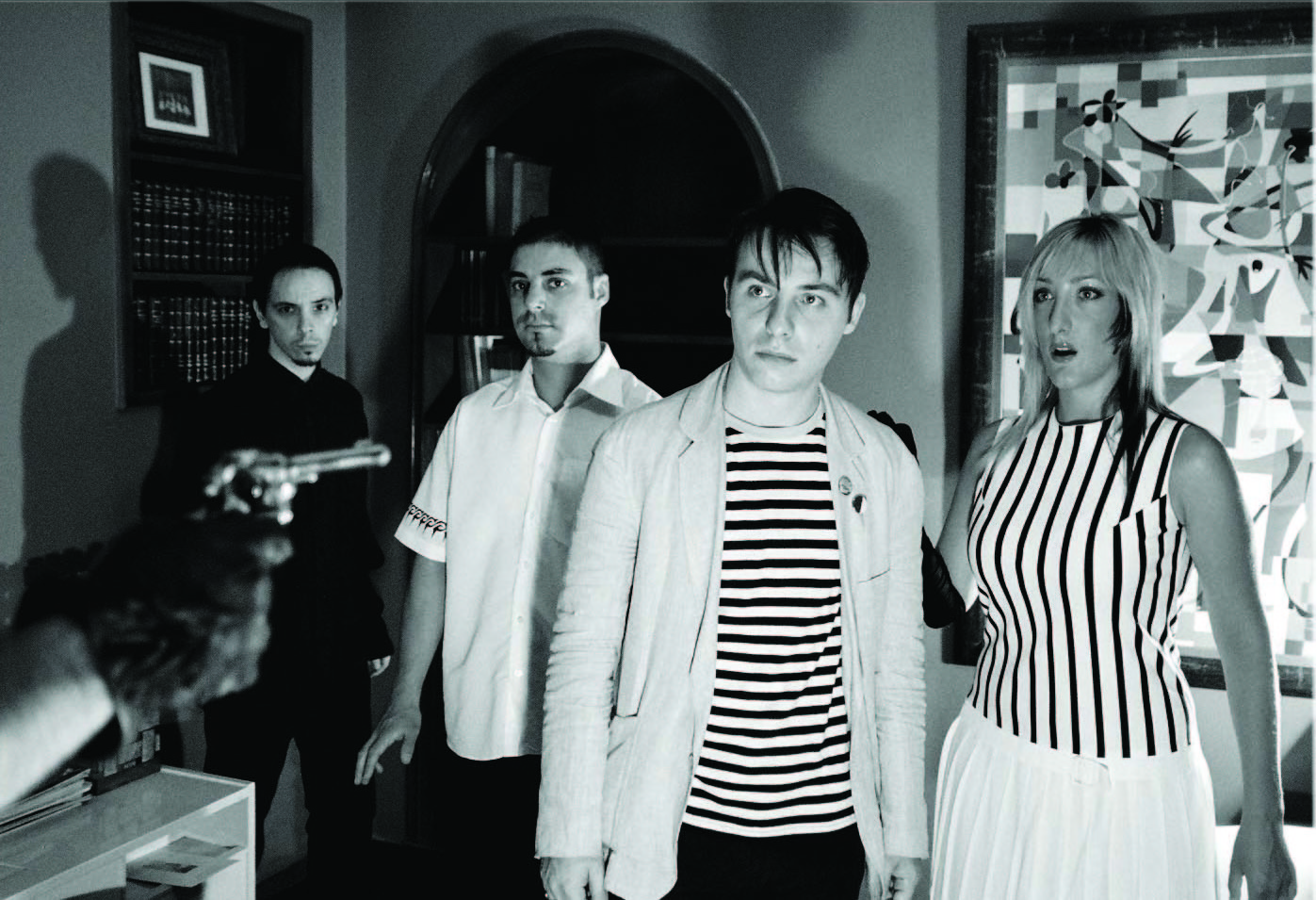

Background information
- Origin: Athens, Attica
- Genres: Electronica, Pop, Indie
- Years active: 2003–present
- Labels: LMusic, EMI
- Members: P.Dreamweaver; Dioni; George G. Stathis K.
- Website: www.myspace.com/astyplaz

Astyplaz is an Athens-based 4 piece electronica/synthpop outfit.

== Biography ==
Astyplaz is a neologism. It is composed of the word 'asty' which in Ancient Greek means city and the French word 'plage' meaning beach. With this neologism, more or less a poetical metaphor of beach culture to the city is achieved (city beach).

In the autumn of 2005 Astyplaz debut album Name Your Slippers was released (L Music – Canada). The album title was inspired by the controversial author G.C. Lichtenberg (1742 - 1799 who was considered a forerunner of Surrealism).

Following the debut album release, a series of live concerts ensued, playing alongside names such as Faithless (to a crowd of 5,000), Chemical Brothers, Soft Cell, DAF, Covenant, Haujobb, Melotron, Sigmatropic and Mikro. Astyplaz also performed as headline act in concerts throughout Athens and in other cities of Greece such as Patras, Thessaloniki and Larissa.

November 2006 will find Astyplaz making their first official North America tour. (Montreal – Toronto – New York City – New Jersey – Boston – Cleveland – Minneapolis – Chicago). This tour makes Astyplaz the first English-speaking Greek (non metal) band to tour Canada and the United States.

With the commencement of 2007 Astyplaz continue their live appearances, this time in Australia (Sydney-Melbourne-Brisbane). This is the first time a Greek band with English lyrics has toured Australian cities.

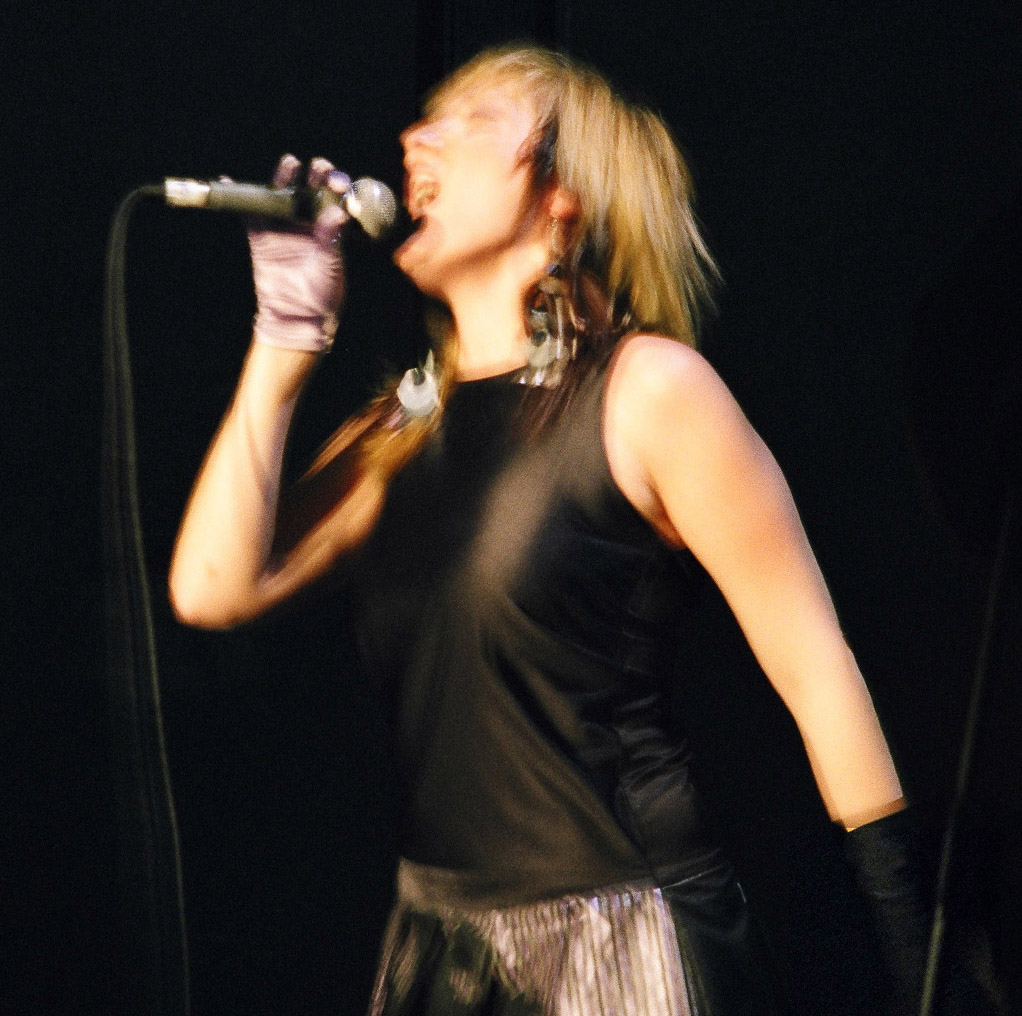
Dioni at a concert in New York City.

== Albums ==
Name Your Slippers (L Music - 2005)

Bi (L Music, EMI - 2008)

== Compilations ==
Inoteka Dance Traxx V.I.O (Capp Records)
The Strength of Whispers (Universal Music)
Greek Electro 01 (Universal Music)
Eclectic Dance Vol.1 (Plus Rec/Universal Music)
Greek Electro 02 (Universal Music)

== References-Reviews ==
www.side-line.com
www.avopolis.gr
fugues.com
www.pop-rock.gr
