= Cenobita =

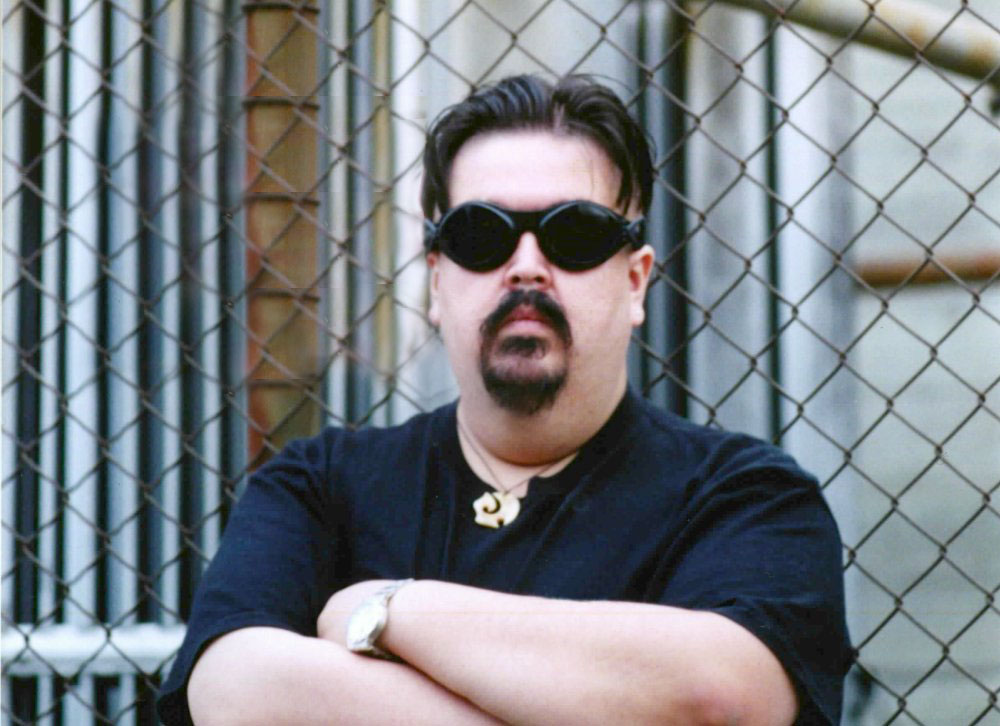
- Claus Bita, frontman for Cenobita.

Background information
- Origin: Mexico City, Mexico
- Genres: Electro-industrial; aggrotech; cyberpunk
- Years active: 1994–present
- Labels: Opción Sónica; Trisol Music Group; Matrix Cube
- Members: Claus Bita
- Past members: Omar Flo
- Website: www.cenobita.com

Cenobita is an aggrotech/cyberpunk band based in Mexico City, created in 1994 by Claus Bita (programming, vocals and production) and former band member Omar Flo (vocals).

== History ==
Cenobita formed as a duo of Claus Bita and Omar Flo in August 1994. Bita and Flo met in Mexico City in 1993 and discovered a shared like for industrial and electronic music, inspired by bands such as Skinny Puppy and Front Line Assembly, and drawing mutual conceptual inspiration from the 'cyberpunk' works of William Gibson. At the time, Flo owned some equipment that the duo used to begin making their own electronic music. They chose the name "Cenobita," Spanish for Cenobite, which they described as meaning "an anchorate, a person that is dedicated to conceiving the meaning of life and to following his or her own principles."

Cenobita was a founding member of a loose association known as 'La Corporacion' alongside fellow Mexico City acts Hocico and Deus Ex Machina. Their involvement in this group, which was organized around the desire to promote the electro-industrial scene in Mexico City, led to numerous live performances. By 1996, Flo established the annual Electronic Music and Arts festival in Mexico City, at which Cenobita was a frequent participant.

Their first public work was the track "Genetica Mechanica," which was released on the Opción Sónica compilation From Trance to Cyber in 1994. The following year Cenobita recorded the demo tape Cybertuality which featured a more crossover sound using guitars. In 1996 they released a longer demo tape named Visiones. The early demos were met to a generally positive response, both in their homeland and around the world. By 1999, they released their debut CD Neo Milenio on the independent Mexican label Opción Sónica. By this time they dropped the guitars and engaged in a more sample-heavy electronic sound.

In 2000, the band toured the US with Flesh Field, God Module, and Negative Format.

The band began to make inroads into the US market, though Omar Flo left the line-up in 2001, leaving Claus Bita as the sole member of the group. The Matrix Cube label issued their debut album in Europe during the same year, and Cenobita's first European tour followed the release of follow-up album 'Metamorphosis' in 2002.

== Musical and performance style ==
The lyrics are influenced by many cyberpunk themes and features, including the novel Neuromancer by writer William Gibson, and experiences of daily life in Mexico City. The music itself has an electronica/aggrotech sound, with pounding beats, complex harmony and noisy soundscapes. Vocals are mainly distorted and are sung in both English and Spanish.

For live performances, the band used Omar Flo's theater background to generate a highly visual aspect to their shows. Their stage shows take on a distinct performance art ethic, including customized stage props and dynamic effects and theatrics including smashing electronics and the use of blood.

== Discography ==
=== Albums ===
- Neo Milenio (1999, Opción Sónica, Released by Trisol Music Group in Europe in 2001)
- Metamorfosis (2002, Trisol/Matrix Cube)

=== Demos ===
- Cyberuality (1995 Demo Tape)
- Visiones (1996 Demo Tape)
