= Euphorbia (band) =

Brazilian musical group

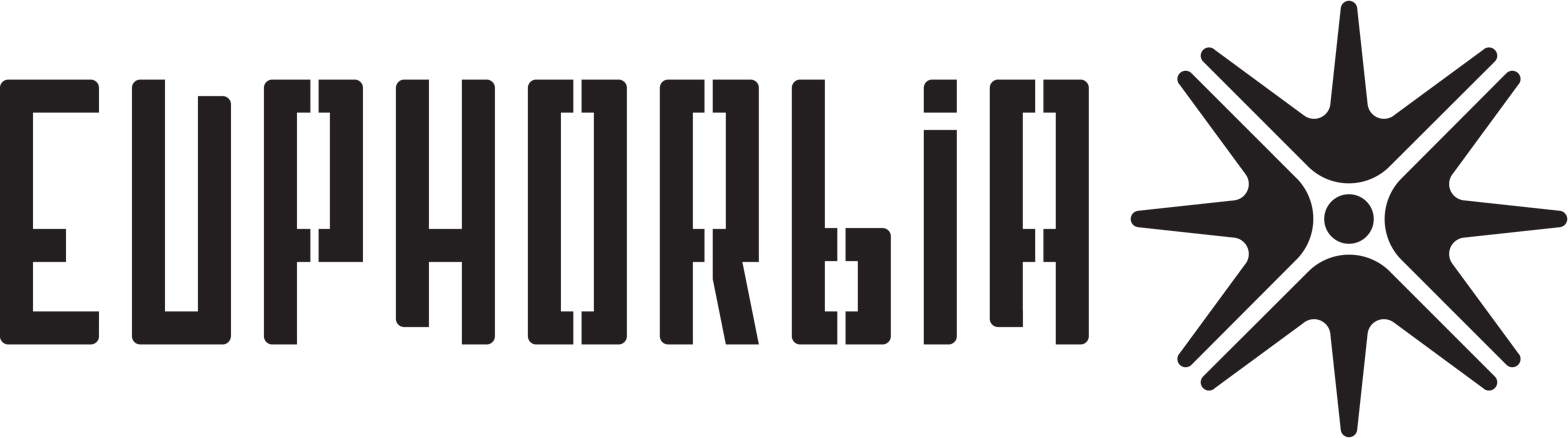

Background information
- Origin: Brazil
- Genres: EBM, Dark electro
- Years active: 2005–present
- Labels: Independent, Phantasma 13
- Members: Ulisses Righi; Cirion Barboza
- Website: www.euphorbia.com.br

Achromatopsia from the album Achromatopsia
This short sample shows the use of short audio samples in addition to a voice track.

Euphorbia is a Brazilian music group formed in 2005 and originally from Porto Alegre, Brazil. The band is one of the Dark electro pioneers in Brazil. Their music is in the electro-industrial genre. Their name originates from the Einstürzende Neubauten song Blume.

== History ==
Euphorbia was formed in 2005 by Ulisses Righi and Cirion Barboza, after they played together in an Alternative rock band. The band played its first concert in 2006, at the Macondo Bar in Santa Maria, Brazil.

Its first demo, "Fractal Chaos", was released in 2007 and included the Brazilian underground hit "Cage". Soon after, Euphorbia was invited to be part of the Pet Shop Boys' Fundamental Tour, playing as the opening act at the Gigantinho Arena.

In 2008, Euphorbia's song Arcturus was featured in the Vade Retro Machina compilation, which contained only Brazilian industrial music groups.

In 2009, Euphorbia released a live album called Live at OhLaLa, featuring ten songs, including "Matricial", "Cage", "Erich Zann" and a cover of Harry's Songs of Metal and Flesh. The band also was featured on The Sky Is Grey - A Tribute To Harry with Songs of Metal and Flesh.

In 2010, Euphorbia released the Achromatopsia EP, featuring four songs, including "Bloodhold" and "Pater Noster".

In 2012, Euphorbia's song Achromatopsia was featured in the Alfa Matrix compilation Endzeit Bunkertracks - Act VI and in the Engraved Ritual compilation Synthetic Rage Vol 1.

In 2015, Euphorbia released a remastered version of the Achromatopsia EP, which included Erich Zann as an extra track. The band also announced an upcoming album for 2016.

In 2016, Euphorbia released Eternal Lie, featuring 12 tracks and including a remix by the Brazilian electro-industrial group Nahtaivel.

== Band members ==
- Ulisses Righi; vocals, synthesizers and programming (2005–present)
- Cirion Barboza; synthesizers and programming (2005–present)

== Discography ==
=== Albums ===
- Live at OhLaLa, (2009, Independent)
- Eternal Lie, (2016, Independent)

=== EPs ===
- Achromatopsia (2010, Independent)
- Achromatopsia (Remastered) (2015, Independent)

=== Compilations ===
- Vade Retro Machina (13xFile), "Arcturus", Phantasma 13 2008
- The Sky Is Grey - A Tribute To Harry (16xFile), "Songs of Metal and Flesh", Phantasma 13 2009
- Synthetic Rage Volume 1 (CD), "Achromatopsia", Engraved Ritual 2012
- Endzeit Bunkertracks [Act VI] (4xCD, Comp + 40xFile), "Achromatopsia", Alfa Matrix 2012
