= Gridlock (band) =

American experimental electronic band

- Also known as: Under
- Origin: United States
- Genres: Drum and bass; electro-industrial; glitch; post-industrial; IDM
- Years active: 1994–2005
- Labels: Pendragon; Unit; Hymen
- Spinoffs: Dryft
- Members: Mike Wells; Mike Cadoo
- Past members: Bobby Cochran

Gridlock was a San Francisco based experimental electronic band, consisting of Mike Wells and Mike Cadoo. Conceived by Wells in 1993, as "heaviness through electronics", the band was initially a part of the electro-industrial scene, but the band's sound eventually began incorporating more atmospheric textured elements, as well as elements of glitch and IDM.

== Biography ==
Gridlock began as an expression of Mike Wells' desire to stray from his experience in the San Francisco thrash metal scene, and his interest in experimental music. During the production of his initial recordings under the Gridlock moniker, he met Skinlab guitarist Mike Cadoo through the Oakland heavy metal scene, who eventually joined Gridlock as a vocalist. The duo released their first two demos, Sickness and Frozen, in 1995 and 1996 respectively. During these early days, the band brought on a former bandmate, Bobby Cochran, for live percussion but his involvement ended after a short time. American labels had difficulty pinning down the bands dissonant, noise-based sound, making it difficult to secure a contract. Eventually their demos reached Pendragon Records leading to a contract and their first release in 1997.

The band's sound on the first demos and their debut album The Synthetic Form was originally akin to the sound of Skinny Puppy with fewer vocals and an ambient aspect not normally found in industrial at the time. At this time, Wells was the principal songwriter of the band. Starting with 1998's Further, they took on more and more ambient and futuristic electronic sounds and slowly lessened their industrial edge whilst removing any trace of vocals; Wells described this period as "the happiest memories" he had with the band. In 2000, the band released a compilation of their early demos entitled 5.25 which included their cover of Berlin's "The Metro (song)" and additional live recordings.

With the 2000 release of Trace, the band saw a more balanced collaborative process between Cadoo and Wells, with some of their most experimental work, but the process was hindered by a house fire, that destroyed their studio. The duo's final album, Formless, was released on Hymen Records in 2003; in retrospective posts and interviews, both Cadoo and Wells admitted that the album represented a failure of communication between the two, exacerbated by the time and arduous effort the album took to create. Cadoo later suggested that part of the reason for this was Wells' unhappiness with the direction Cadoo wanted to take Gridlock in. Retrospectively, however, both men expressed satisfaction with the record as their best work.

The band agreed to take a break after Formless and focus on other ventures, but on March 24, 2005, Wells announced the band's dissolution on its website; according to Cadoo, the announcement was unilateral, and the two had remained estranged since. Their last recorded material to be released was two tracks on the 2006 Hymen Records compilation Travel Sickness. Mike Wells died in January 2022.

== Discography ==
=== Albums ===
- The Synthetic Form (1997), Pendragon
- Further (1999), Pendragon – #14 CMJ RPM Charts
- Trace (2001), Unit – #6 CMJ RPM Charts
- Formless (2003), Hymen

=== EPs and demos ===
- Sickness (demo) (1995)
- Frozen (demo) (1996)
- Engram (2002), Hymen
- Under (2003), Piehead

=== Compilations ===
- 5.25 (limited edition) (2000), Pendragon

=== Singles ===
- "366115" (Gridlock / O2 split 12"), Unit
- "Invert" / "Help Yourself (Remix)" (Gridlock / Steel split 12"), Klangkrieg
- "Bring Out Your Dead" (Gridlock / Panacea split 12"), Component

=== Special releases ===
- live.traces (self-released)
- Trace (12"), Zod
- Formless (2x12"), Hymen

=== Compilation appearances ===
- The Tyranny Off the Beat Vol. 4 CD (Off Beat 1997)
- Exoskeleton CD (Possessive Blindfold 1998)
- Binary Application Extension 05 CD (Culture Shock 1998)
- The Tyranny Off the Beat Vol. 5 CD (Off Beat 1998)
- Classix CD (Off Beat 1999)
- The Flatline Compilation 2 CD (Flatline 1999)
- Virion Sequences CD (Gashed 2000)
- Exoskeleton 3 CD (Possessive Blindfold 2001)
- Masonic CD (Hymen 2002)
- Sub.Session CD (Sub.Session 2002)
- Zod 07 12" (Zod 2002)
- Bitmapping CD (Objective/Subjective 2003)
- Hybrid Components CD (Component 2003)
- Travel Sickness CD (Hymen 2006)

=== Remixes ===
- "Cherised Agony" on Evolution by Android Lust
- "LP1" on Corruption Time by Neutronic
- "Payoff" on Truthead by Aghast View
- "Unforgiven" on Unburied by Allied Vision
- "As Death Approaches" on Inception of Eradication by Holocaust Theory
- "My Saviour" on Redemption EP by Flesh Field
- "In Memorial" on WWW by Individual Totem
- "Wraith" on Moon Phase by Displacer
- "One Man and His Anger" on The Connected Series #4 by Steel
- "J. Doesn't Do Acid Anymore" on Caller ID by Neutral
- "Essence" on Tension by Codec
- "Alive in Arms" on Blamstrain Remixed by Blamstrain
- "Intense Demonic Attacks" by Venetian Snares
