= Nachtmahr =

Austrian techno band

Thomas Rainer
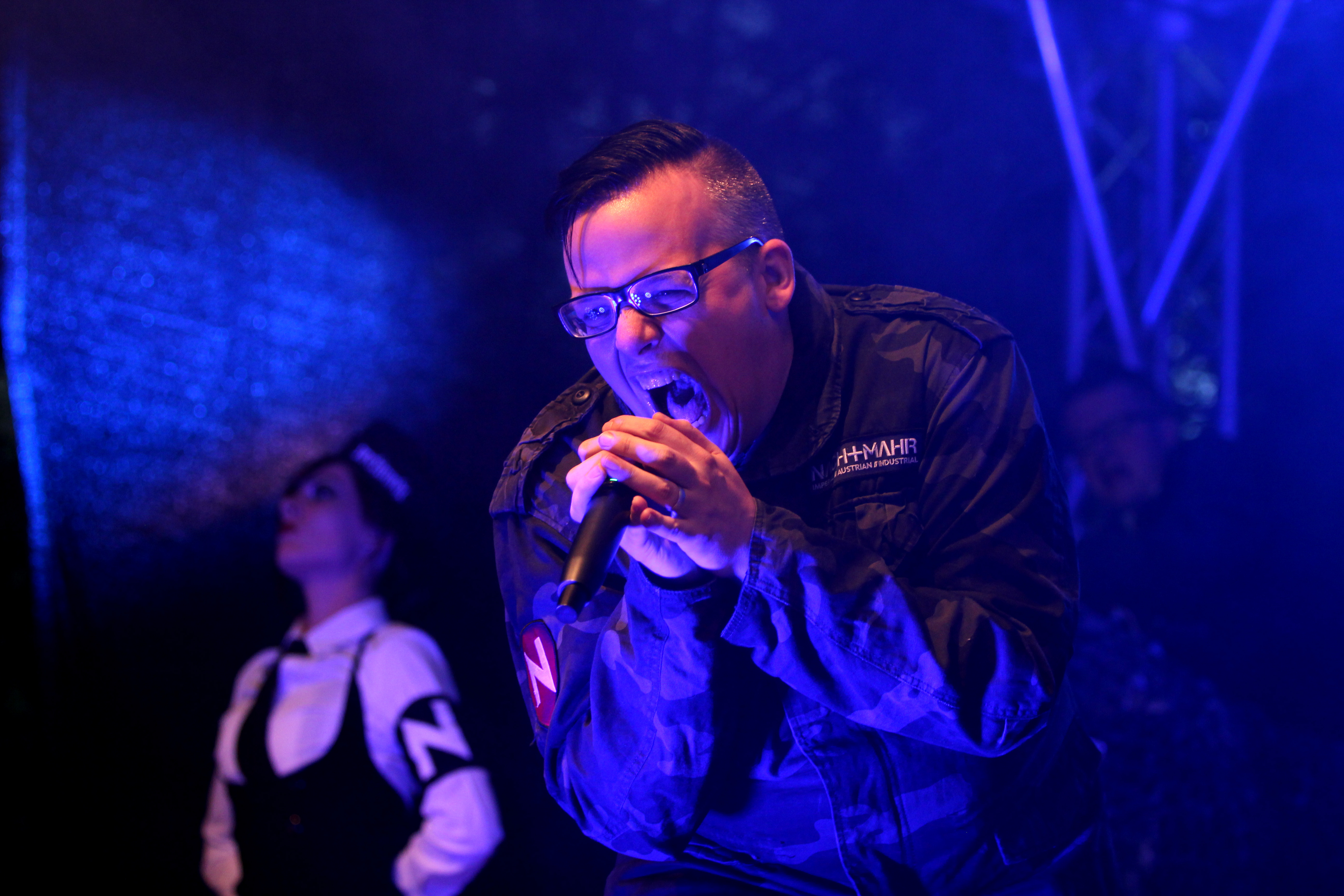
- Thomas Rainer with Nachtmahr at Nocturnal Culture Night Festival, Deutzen, Germany 2014

Background information
- Origin: Vienna, Austria
- Genres: EBM; Techno
- Years active: 2007–Present
- Label: Trisol Music Group
- Members: Thomas Rainer - Vocals, music
- Website: http://www.nachtmahr.at

Nachtmahr is the solo project of Thomas Rainer (also known for his other projects: L'Âme Immortelle and the now defunct Siechtum). Nachtmahr's musical style is best characterized as Electronic Body Music.

== History ==
In September 2007, Nachtmahr had its first release, "Kunst ist Krieg (i.e., Art Is War)". The album's song "BoomBoomBoom", quickly became popular in industrial clubs around the world.

In 2008 Nachtmahr released its first full-length album entitled "Feuer frei". Like "Kunst Ist Krieg", it quickly gained popularity in industrial clubs. The single "Katharsis" joined "BoomBoomBoom" as a worldwide club hit, and helped the album stay in the top 10 of the German Deutsche Alternative Charts (DAC) for more than 6 weeks. The German magazine Orkus called "Feuer frei" was “the new standard for the electro industrial genre”. However, the album did fall under criticism for being too repetitive. While reviewers agreed it was a great album for the dancefloor, some felt it did little more than such, pointing out a lack of variation and originality between songs.

The album "Alle Lust will Ewigkeit" and its single Tanzdiktator both reached No. 1 in the Deutsche Alternative Charts.

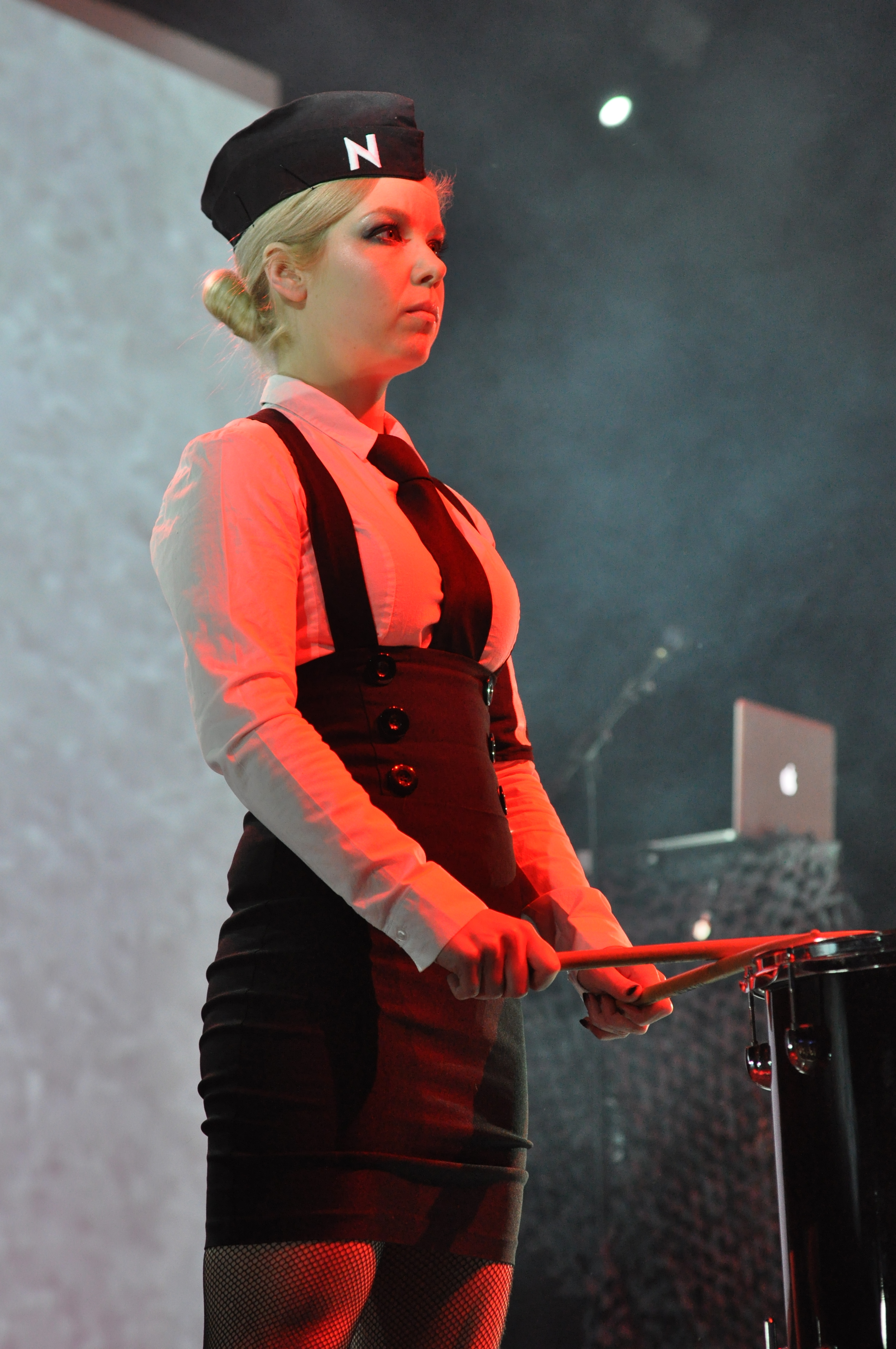
Mädchen in Uniform, part of the show of Nachtmahr at e-tropolis Festival 2013

In 2010, Nachtmahr's third album "Semper Fidelis" was released, again placing highly in the German charts.

In 2014 Nachtmahr organised an "Operation America" tour where they played across 20 states in less than one month.

== Controversy ==
During the Kinetik Festival of 2012, Nachtmahr (along with Combichrist) was criticized on stage by its opening act Ad·ver·sary, who showed, during its last five minutes of its set, a multimedia presentation with examples illustrating sexist and fascist imagery in the music videos and album covers of Nachtmahr. The showing ended with a call to reject those notions, and to demand better. Rainer denied the allegations in an interview with industrial magazine I Die: You Die, instead characterizing his stage persona as "militaristic", though he acknowledged Nachtmahr's potential for misinterpretation and controversy. He also invited the female stage performers from his act to the interview, who likewise rejected the claims of sexism.

== Discography ==
=== Studio albums ===
- Feuer Frei (2008)
- Alle Lust Will Ewigkeit (2009)
- Semper Fidelis (2010)
- Veni Vidi Vici (2012)
- Feindbild (2014)
- Kampfbereit (2016)
- Antithese (2019)
- Flamme (2020)
- Stellungskrieg (2021)
- Verboten! (2024)

=== EP's ===
- Kunst Ist Krieg (2007)
- Katharsis (2008)
- Mädchen in Uniform (2010)
- Can You Feel the Beat? (2011)
- Widerstand (2018)
- Gehorsam (2018)
- Beweg dich! (2021)

=== Compilations ===
- Unbeugsam (2017)

== Collaborations ==
- I (2004) (with Sun Of The Sleepless)
