= Schallfaktor =

- Origin: Germany
- Genres: Electro-industrial
- Years active: 2006–present
- Labels: Infacted Recordings
- Members: Drazen Sucic; Sascha Pniok
- Past members: Steffen Minich
- Website: Official myspace site

Schallfaktor is a German electro-industrial musical project by Drazen Sucic that started in 2006.

== History ==
Schallfaktor began as a conceptual project between 2002 and 2003 by Sucic with the first album Schmerzgrenze released by both artists in 2006.

In 2007 the project signed to Infacted Recordings, with the End of Love EP release sending the single to position 3 in the Deutsche Alternative Charts (DAC). The album contained a total of seven remixes of the title track by various artists including Suicide Commando and Grendel. It was reviewed favorably by the German Sonic Seducer magazine calling it a "Hellectro Newcomer" with great potential.

The next full album Sittenverfall was released in 2008 reaching position 6 in the DAC. The Sonic Seducer compared it to the music of Agonoize, Straftanz and Feindflug. The Side-Line magazine quoted similar bands in a review and called the album "a notable step forward for Schallfaktor" although a lack of originality was mentioned.

Schallfaktor has played on various European festivals including Wave Gotik Treffen, NCN, Summer Darkness and the Infacted Festival.

== Discography ==
- Schmerzgrenze LP (Self-release, 2006)
- End of Love EP (Infacted, 2007)
- Sittenverfall LP (Infacted, 2008)
