= Here Won No One =

EP by Finite Automata
- Released: November 03, 2011
- Recorded: Mid–late 2010
- Genre: Industrial
- Length: 27:42
- Label: Beyond Therapy Records
- Producer: Mod Eschar

Finite Automata chronology
Here Won No One (2011)	Recurse (2012)

Here Won No One is the first EP release by American electro-industrial band Finite Automata. It was released on November 3, 2011 by Beyond Therapy Records in digital format and compact disc.

The EP's title is a play on the swine flu designation H1N1, The title track is heavily critical of the American healthcare system, in particular, for-profit healthcare. The EP was originally self recorded and released and then re-issued through the band's label Beyond Therapy Records. Although praised by many as a "throwback" to early electro-industrial music, it was criticized for its lack of production quality due to its self-released nature. Many of the tracks from this release would be later reworked on the band's follow-up full length Album Recurse.

== Track listing ==
No.	Title	Length
1.	"Here Won No One"	5:22
2.	"Here Won No One (Malpractice Mix)"	6:50
3.	"The Dervish"	6:23
4.	"Rot Inside (demo version)"	4:56
5.	"The Shroud"	4:11
Total length:		27:42

== Personnel ==
- Mod Eschar - Lyrics, Vocals, Arrangement, Sampler
- c. Grendel - Keyboards, Sequencer, Composer
- Mat Syn - Noises, Gadgetry
