= The Atomica Project =

- Origin: United States
- Genres: Trip hop, downtempo
- Years active: 2004–present
- Labels: Flagrant Records
- Members: Wade Alin
- Past members: Lauren Cheatham; Christine Ingaldson

The Atomica Project, formerly known as Atomica, is a trip hop band based in Chicago, Illinois. The group's members are producer and songwriter Wade Alin of Christ Analogue and vocalist Lauren Cheatham, with keyboardist Percy Trayanov and drummer Rey Guajardo joining them on tour. Christine Flutter Ingaldson later joined as vocalist.

Alin, formerly based in New York City, moved to Chicago, where he met Cheatham. The Atomica Project's first record, Metropolitan, was released on Positron Records in 2005. The album was inspired by Alin's time in New York. Keyboard compared the record to Portishead and Evanescence.

== Discography ==
=== Albums ===
==== Metropolitan (2005) ====
1. "One Day In New York City" - 4:12
2. "Delorian" - 3:25
3. "Larsen" - 4:26
4. "Salt" - 3:57
5. "Recent" - 3:20
6. "Quiver" - 4:04
7. "Bittersweet" - 4:02
8. "Sorrow" - 4:23
9. "Pollen" - 3:16
10. "Gun" - 4:22
11. "Worry" - 4:22

==== Grayscale (2008) ====
1. "When I Was Just A Young Girl" - 4:08
2. "Forecast" - 3:40
3. "Afraid" - 3:35
4. "Gravity" - 4:33
5. "Storm" - 3:40
6. "I Woke Up In This World" - 3:22
7. "Losing Sleep" - 3:41
8. "All The Loneliness In The World" - 4:13
9. "Into The Arms Of Strangers" - 3:56
10. "Evaporate" - 4:05
11. "The War Is Over" - 3:52
12. "Grayscale" - 3:24
13. "Gravity" (Iris Remix) - 5:28

==== The Non-Affair (2010) ====
1. "Damage" - 4:25
2. "The Devil" - 4:16
3. "Blur And Gray" - 3:55
4. "Mutiny" - 4:25
5. "Winter" - 4:11
6. "Tears In My Eyes" - 4:30
7. "Let's Find A Way" - 4:37
8. "We're In This Together" - 4:26
9. "The Buildings (As They Fall)" - 3:51
10. "Moviesong" - 3:24
11. "The Non Affair" - 4:06

==== Self Notes (2014) ====
1. "I Can Save Us" - 4:55
2. "A Night Like This" - 4:57
3. "Bitterways" - 4:52
4. "The Beauty" - 4:09
5. "Wartime" - 4:09
6. "Silver" - 3:49
7. "Faith" - 3:11
8. "Great Minds and Valentines" - 2:34
9. "Notes" - 3:18
10. "Black Water" - 4:20

=== EPs ===
==== 1st in a Series of Dramatic Events (2009) ====
1. "Jetstreams" - 4:35
2. "Our Hero" - 3:39
3. "Oh, So Quickly" - 3:33
4. "Nuevo" - 4:00
5. "The Greatest Night" - 5:17

==== Overseas (2009) ====
1. "Hostage" - 3:29
2. "Little Dreams" - 4:14
3. "Tidalwaves" - 3:13
4. "The Obvious" - 4:05
5. "Recent" (Corey McCafferty Remix) - 3:19

=== Singles ===
==== Gravity (2008) ====
1. "Gravity" - 4:31
2. "Gravity" (Iris Remix) - 5:28
3. "Gravity" (Bounte Remix) - 5:52

==== The Beauty (2012) ====
1. "The Beauty" - 4:09

==== Misfired (2013) ====
1. "Misfired" - 4:09
