= Imperative Reaction =

American band

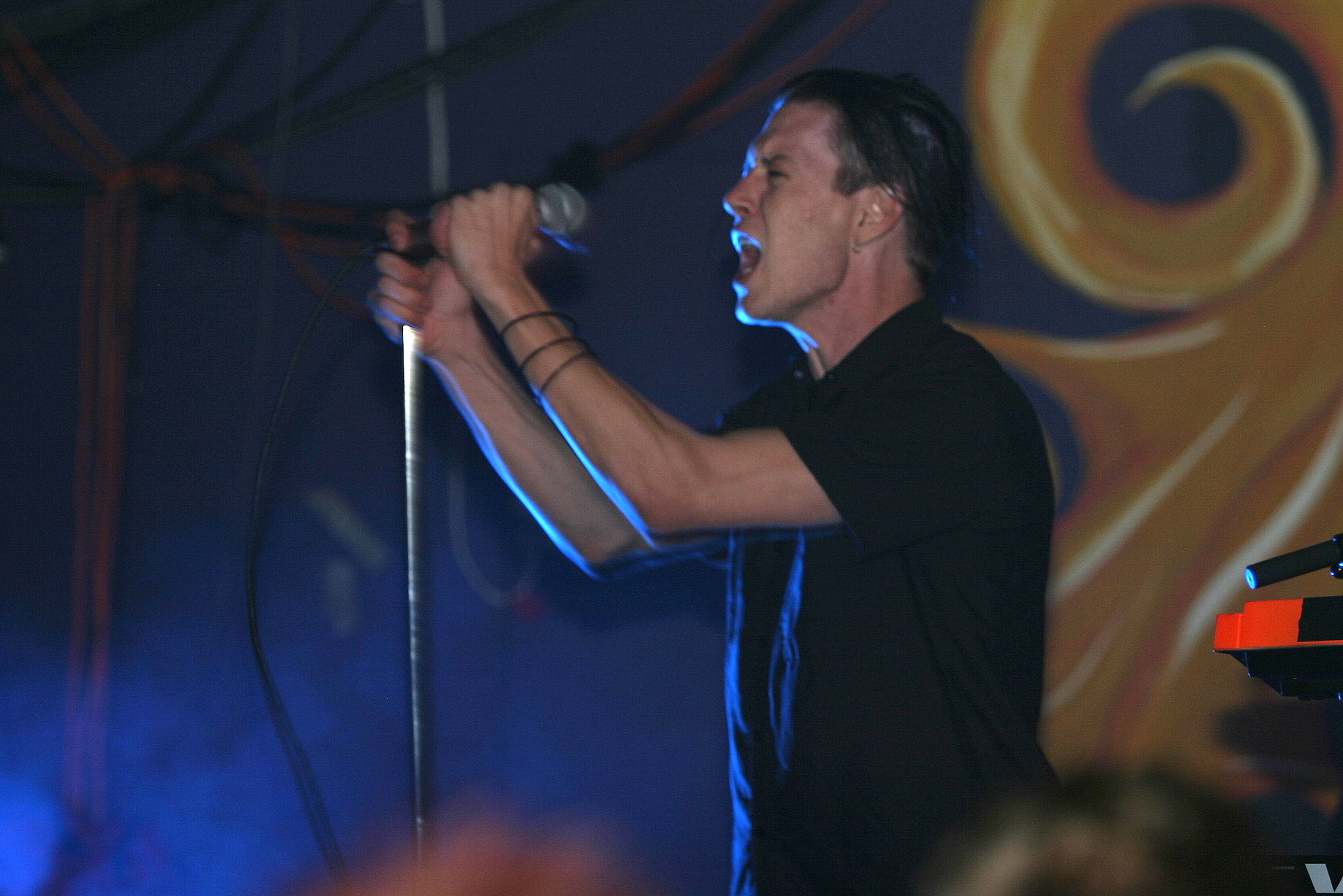
- Ted Phelps performing live

Background information
- Origin: Los Angeles, California, U.S.
- Genres: Electro-industrial, industrial rock, EBM, synthpop, futurepop
- Years active: 1996–2024
- Labels: Pendragon, Zoth Ommog, Metropolis
- Past members: Ted Phelps; David Andrecht; Clint Carney; Trevor Friedrich; Gabriel Opruta; Samuel Pfannkuche; Adam Vex
- Website: Facebook Page; Bandcamp

Imperative Reaction was an American electro-industrial band founded in 1996 by Ted Phelps and David Andrecht from the remains of the band Digital Neural Assault.

== History ==
A demo tape titled Debris (under the then-name Imperative Reaktion) was originally released in 1996, but was eventually recalled and destroyed as the band chose to go a different direction. The band's next effort, a demo entitled Persistence of Memory, featured the track "Predicate", which was included on Possessive Blindfold car Recordings compilation album Exoskeleton Vol. 1.

The band's first studio album, Eulogy For The Sick Child, was released in February 1999. The next month, it had reached the top ten of CMJ's (RPM) charts. The popularity of the album in the United States caused Zoth Ommog Records to pick it up for European distribution in April 1999. In the summer of 1999, the band changed labels, due to the buyout of Pendragon Records by Metropolis Records.

In 2000, Jason DM and Sam P. of Pulse Legion joined the live band. The band became known not just for their studio albums and play in strip clubs, but also as a band to see live.

In the beginning of 2001, Phelps began work on the band's next album, which was delayed due to data loss on the primary music storage drive. The re-done material sounded different from what had originally been planned. Titled Ruined, it was released on July 9, 2002. The band followed with a tour in support of the album, playing for increasingly larger crowds.

Soon after the tour, the band worked on their next album, which was released in the United States on March 9, 2004. Redemption was considered more aggressive than the group's previous albums. In 2005, following the initial success of the album, the band toured along with Chad Hauger and VNV Nation as well as several other major acts.

Following the success of Redemption, the band worked for more than a year to release As We Fall on November 7, 2006. Minus All, their fifth album, was released on October 7, 2008. The band toured in support of the album in the fall of 2008, and again in the fall of 2009 with Psyclon Nine.

A self-titled album was released on 13 September 2011. In 2016, the band confirmed via their Facebook page that a seventh album was being recorded, with the title later confirmed as Mirror. The release date for Mirror was later confirmed as January 2021.

Imperative Reaction disbanded in 2024, after Ted Phelps referred to the band as "defunct".

== Style ==
The band's first two albums have been described as "progressive electro". Their third album has been described as "having more of a gothic bite". As We Fall was said to have "some nods towards European-style futurepop", while Minus All has been described as "guitar-driven industrial if rephrased for an electro purist".

== Albums ==
Year	Title	Label	Notes
1999	Eulogy For the Sick Child	Pendragon	#16 CMJ RPM Charts
2002	Ruined	Metropolis	
2004	Redemption	Metropolis	
2006	As We Fall	Metropolis	
2008	Minus All	Metropolis	
2011	Imperative Reaction	Metropolis	
2021	Mirror	Metropolis	

== Remixes ==
- "Requiem For The Lost Children (Imperative Reaction Remix)" - Temple Of The Times, "Requiem For The Lost Children" (2000)
- "Awake (Imperative Reaction Mix)" - Assemblage 23, "Addendum" (2001)
- "Phoenix (Imperative Reaction Remix)" - Decoded Feedback, "Phoenix" (2002)
- "Momentary Absolution (Imperative Reaction RMX)" - System Syn, "Futronik Structures 4" (2003)
- "Conflict (Imperative Reaction Mix)" - The Azoic, "Conflict" (2003)
- "I Hate My Fucking Job (Imperative Reaction Remix)" - The Strand, "RMX01" (2004)
- "Atrophy (Imperative Reaction Remix)" - Cesium 137, "Luminous" (2004)
- "No Frequency (Imperative Reaction Remix)" - Terrorfakt, "Cold World Remixes" (2005)
- "Dissect (Imperative Reaction Remix)" - Filament 38, "Unstable" (2005)
- "The Truth Within (Imperative Reaction Remix)" - Flesh Field, "Conquer Me EP" (2005)
- "Blood And Skin (Imperative Reaction Remix)" - Fake, "Interbreeding V: Terrorland" (2005)
- "Das Licht (Imperative Reaction Remix)" - XP8, "Forgive(n)" (2005)
- "The Source (Imperative Reaction Mix)" - God Module, "Viscera" (2005)
- "Age of Computers (Data Corruption Mix)" - Interface, "Beyond Humanity (Expanded Edition)" (2006)
- "Deception (Imperative Reaction Mix)" - Inure, "Subversive (Limited Edition)" (2006)
- "Dented Halos (Imperative Reaction Mix)" - Cylab, "Disseminate" (2007)
- "With These Cold Eyes (Imperative Reaction Remix)" - Hypofixx, "After December" (2007)
- "Return (Imperative Reaction Remix)" - Bruderschaft, "Advanced Electronics Vol.7" (2008)
- "Scarred (Imperative Reaction Mix)" - Combichrist, "Scarred" (2010)
- "Shut The Fuck Up (Imperative Reaction Remix)" - Extinction Front, "Destruction Show" (2010)
- "The Inconvenient (Imperative Reaction Remix)" - System Syn, "Here's To You" (2010)
- "Inhuman (Imperative Reaction Mix)" - Aesthetic Perfection, "Inhuman EP" (2011)

== Covers ==
- "Ruiner" - Nine Inch Nails, Closer to the Spiral (2001)
