= Displacer (musician) =

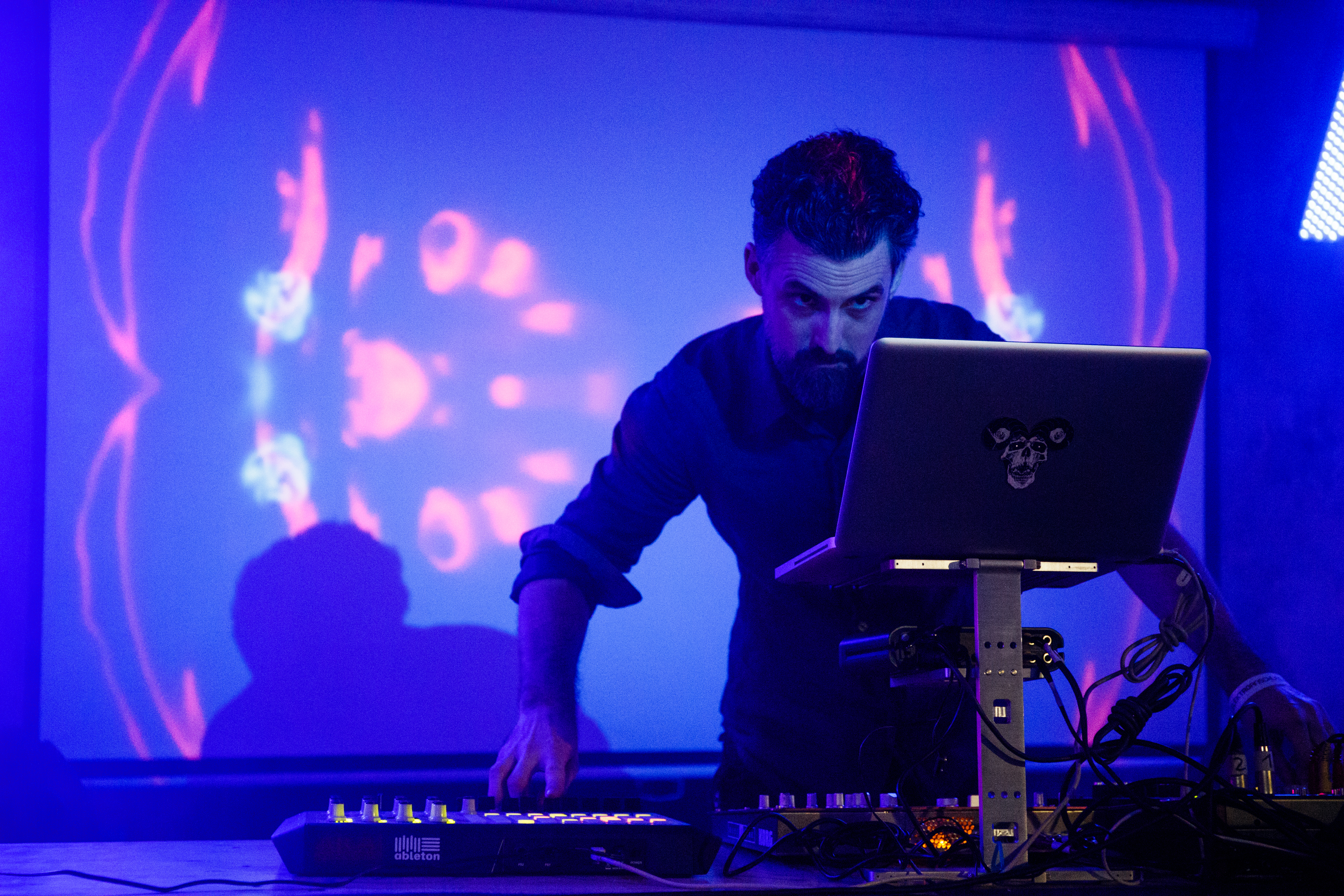
- Morton at the 2014 Elektroanschlag Festival in Altenburg

Background information
- Origin: Toronto, Ontario
- Genres: Intelligent dance music
- Years active: 2003 – present
- Labels: M-tronic, Tympanik Audio
- Members: Michael Morton
- Website: http://www.dsplcr.com

Displacer is the solo electronic project of Toronto, Ontario-based musician Michael Morton.

== Recordings ==
Morton's first released recording was the track "Deep" on Mute Records' Pre-Set New Electronic Music in 2003. He then signed with Paris, France-based M-Tronic Records, through which he released three CDs. In 2008 he signed to Chicago, USA label Tympanik Audio and released three more albums; The Witching Hour, X Was Never Like This..., and the mainly instrumental Night Gallery. Foundations followed in 2012. His recent releases, Electric Dreams in 2014 and 2016's Curse of the Black Vinyl, were released under his own label. The Crime League.

== Remixing ==
In addition to his own music, Displacer has remixed the work of other musicians, including Claire Voyant, Architect, Converter, Beefcake & Monstrum Sepsis from labels including Hymen Records, Ant-Zen, n5MD, Wax Trax, & Metropolis Records.

== Discography ==
- Moon_Phase (2003)
- Arroyo (2004)
- B(uddha)-Sides (2006) MP3 release
- Cage Fighter's Lullaby (2006)
- Remixes For Free? (2006) MP3 release
- The Witching Hour (2008)
- X Was Never Like This... (2009)
- Lost Mission EP (2009)
- Night Gallery (2011)
- Foundation (2012)
- Masterless (2013) FLAC release
- Missing Warriors (2017) FLAC release
