= Terrorfakt =

American industrial power noise music project

- Origin: United States
- Genres: Industrial; Power noise
- Years active: 2001–present
- Labels: Metropolis Records; Tinman Records; Industrial Strength Records; Industrial Movement Records
- Members: Hellraver, and various supporting live members.
- Website: terrorfakt.com

Terrorfakt is an industrial-power noise musical project from New York City, and created in response to the events of September 11, 2001. They are currently signed to Metropolis Records.

Although the project involved multiple members in its early days, it is now the de facto solo project of Benjamin Vincent Dewalt (who also works under the names DJ Hellraver, and T-Faktor). Having produced earlier albums, in 2003 they debuted on Tinman Records with Deconstruction. Prior to the Tinman Records release, a different version of Deconstruction was released on CD-R independently.

In 2004, Terrorfakt signed to Metropolis Records and released "Cold Steel World" and its follow-up remix album Cold World Remixes. In 2006 "Teethgrinder" was released on Metropolis Records, followed by 2009's Re/Evolution, which featured re-mastered versions of select tracks from Deconstruction, "Reconstruction" and some new and unreleased tracks.

== Terrorfakt live ==
Terrorfakt has toured extensively since their inception. The band has toured with, and in support of, such acts as: Front 242, Nitzer Ebb, Front Line Assembly, Winterkälte, Prurient, Haujobb, E-Craft, Funker Vogt, Manufactura, This Morn' Omina and Hocico, in addition to performing live at large industrial music festivals; such as Montreal's C.O.M.A., and Kinetik.

== Discography ==
=== Regular releases ===
- Deconstruction (2003)
- Reconstruction: The Remixes (2003)
- Cold Steel World (2004)
- Cold World Remixes (2005)
- Teethgrinder (2006)
- The Fine Art of Killing Yourself (2007)
- Re/Evolution (2009)

=== Other releases ===
- We Know Pain (CD-R)
- Ausland (CD-R)
- Kalte Stahl Herz (CD-R)
- REworks (CD-R)
- REworks 2 - Friendly Fire (CD-R)
- Arsenal (12")
- Spineless (12")
- Achtung (12")
- The Fine Art of Killing Yourself (12")
- Music from Antarctica (as T-Faktor) (CD-R)
- Bricksplitter (as T-Faktor) (2009)

=== Remixes ===
Hellraver has remixed other artists songs (at their request) that have been released elsewhere. Some of these remixes include:

- "The Clock is Ticking" on Unter Null's The Failure Epiphany Limited Edition
- "Gelöbnis" on P·A·L's Retro Ant-Zen (2004)
- "Seditious Minds" on C/A/T's The Rogue Pair Crunch Pod (2005)
- "Enemy Within" on C/A/T's ATF Crunch Pod (2006)
- "Domination" on Pneumatic Detach's re.vis.cer.a Hive Records (2006)
- "Pass the Drill" on Caustic's Rainbows, Puppies and Crap
- "Head Shot" on code 000's secret societies
- "Bound with Sympathy" on [Matrix 002]
- "Down" on Dym's Signal down
- "Dementia" and "Radio Dead" on UV's Refractions: Remixes in a different Light
- "Wasted Time" on Interface's Wasted Time
- "Faded Into One" (by Imperative Reaction) on Das Bunker: Fifteen Minutes Into The Future
- "Weltenzerstörer (Terrorfakt Remix)" on Doomer's The Ruins Of Your World on (DPR003) Dephected Propaganda Records (2010)
