= God Module =

American dark electronic band

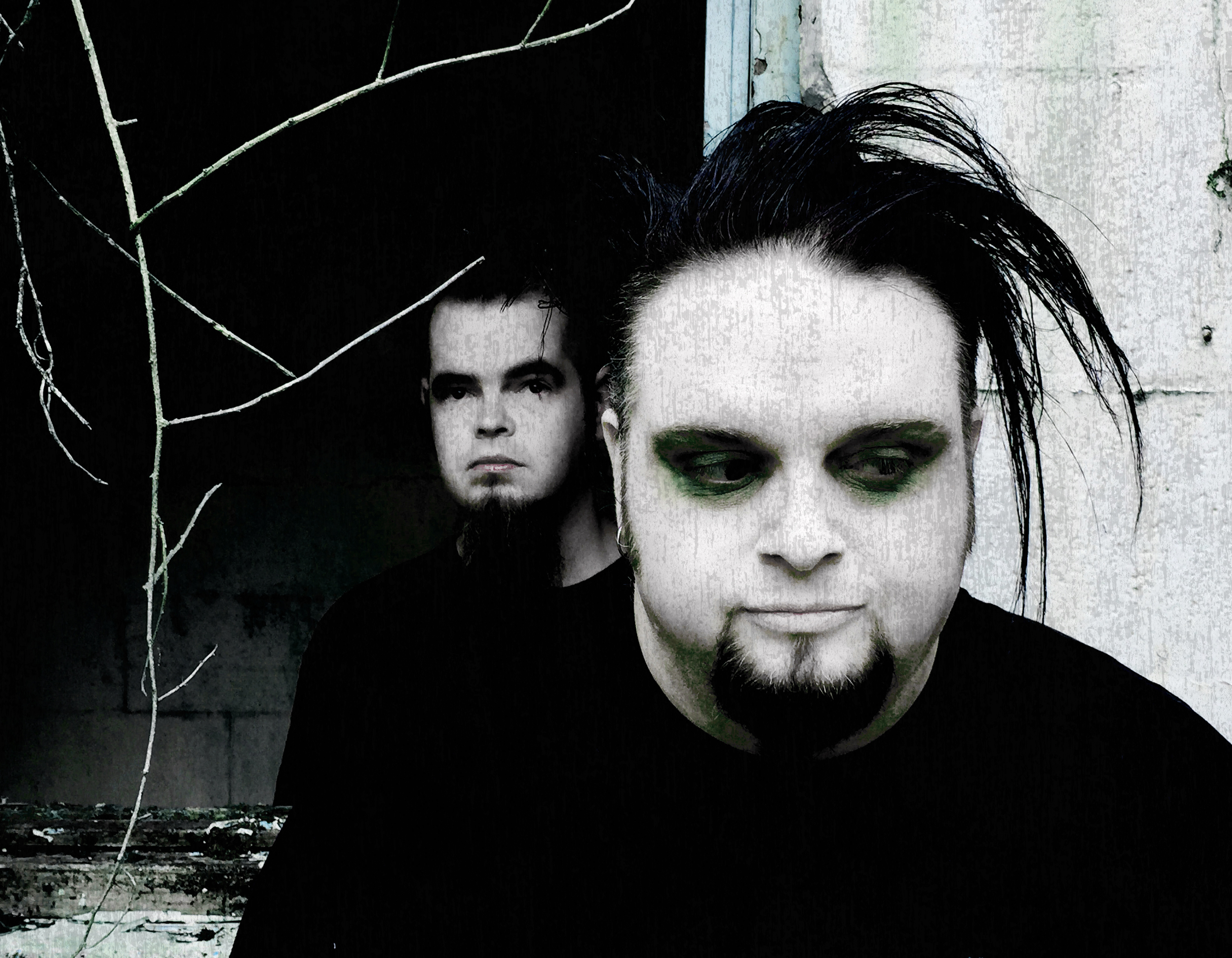

Background information
- Also known as: God Mod
- Genres: Electro-industrial, EBM
- Years active: 1999–present
- Labels: Metropolis Records (North America); Out of Line; Infacted; Inception; Sector 9 Studios
- Spinoffs: Hexheart
- Members: Jasyn Bangert; Andrew Pearson; Jarvis Chris
- Past members: Andrew Ramirez; Byron C. Miller
- Website: www.godmodule.org

God Module is an American dark electronic band founded in 1999 from Orlando, Florida. Since 2006 they have been based out of Washington state. God Module is currently signed to Metropolis Records.

== History ==
God Module was formed in 1999 by Jasyn Bangert and Andrew Ramirez. The band name was derived from an episode of The X-Files that dramatized a theory about a part of the human brain rumored to be responsible for mankind's belief in religion and the concept of God. The band's first album, Artificial, was released by Inception Records in 2000.

In 2002, Jasyn Bangert co-formed Sector 9 Studios along with Alex Matheu of Negative Format. The band had their initial release of their first EP, Perception (2002), and second album, Empath (2003) on the label.

In 2000, the band toured the US with Flesh Field, Negative Format, and Cenobita. God Module has toured the US and North America frequently, touring almost yearly in the States since 2010, and have played festivals and short tours in Europe.

In 2017, Bangert and Andrew Pearson along with Patrick Hogan of Voicecoil recorded music under the name Hexheart. Hexheart released an album, Midnight On A Moonless Night, and the accompanying single for "A Thousand Times" on Metropolis Records.

== Members ==
=== Current ===
- Jasyn Bangert - lead vocals, programming
- Andrew Pearson - keyboards, backing vocals
- Jarvis Chris - percussion

=== Former ===
- Clint Carney - live keyboards, guest vocals Séance and False Face records
- Courtney Bangert - live synths (2003–present randomly), guest vocals on Artificial, Empath, Viscera, Let's Go Dark, Séance, Prophecy and The Unsound records
- Jon Siren - live drums on the Triptych and Séance tours
- Brill - live keyboards (2014–present) randomly
- Byron C. Miller - live vocals and keyboards (2003-2010), guest vocals on Empath, Let's Go Dark and The Magic In My Heart is Dead EP
- Andrew Ramirez - band and live member (1999-2002), appears on Artificial CD and Perception EP

== Discography ==
- Artificial (1999) – #11 CMJ RPM Charts
- Perception (EP) (2002)
- Empath (2003)
- Artificial 2.0 (2004)
- Victims Among Friends (EP) (2004)
- Viscera (2005)
- Let's Go Dark (2007)
- The Magic In My Heart Is Dead (2010)
- Rituals (EP) (2011)
- Séance (2011)
- Doppelganger (EP) (2012)
- Empath 2.0 (2013)
- Psychic Surgery: The Victims Among Friends and Perception EPs (2013)
- False Face (2014)
- Prophecy (2015)
- Unconscious (EP) (2019)
- Cross My Heart (EP) (2019)
- Unsound (Single) (2019)
- The Unsound (2019)
- The Unsound Remixes (2020)
