= Beyond Therapy Records =

- Founded: 2010
- Founder: Ben V
- Defunct: 2016
- Genre: Industrial music, electronic body music
- Country of origin: United States
- Location: Orlando, Florida

Beyond Therapy Records was an American industrial music record label founded by Ben V of Ludovico Technique in 2010. The label signed primarily underground bands of the industrial, electronic body music, and related genres. It was based in Orlando, Florida. The label's roster included Preacher, Cryogen Second, and MyParasites.

== Dissolution ==
In 2016 the label's entire roster was removed from Bandcamp and all references to the label disappeared from the web. Some releases still exist on iTunes and Spotify. Founder Ben V has not made any statement regarding the fate of the label. Many of its former roster artists have since disbanded or moved on to other record labels.

=== Former Beyond Therapy Records Artists ===
- 9th Evolution
- Acid Casualty
- Cryogen Second
- DespondentMassAtrophy
- Finite Automata
- Force.Is.Machine
- MyParasites
- Preacher
- Professor Grim
- Deprived
- Prognosis
- Man Woman Machine
- Ghostfeeder

== See also ==
- List of record labels
