= Metropolis Records =

American record label

- Founded: 1993
- Founder: Dave Heckman
- Distributor: NAIL • Outside • INgrooves • Virgin Music Group (UMG) • ADA
- Genre: Electro-industrial; synth-pop; gothic rock; punk rock
- Country of origin: U.S.
- Location: Media, Pennsylvania
- Official website: metropolis-records.com

Metropolis Records is a record label that was founded in Philadelphia in 1993, by Dave Heckman. The label's all-electronic format closely tracked with European contemporaries including Off Beat, and since 1995 has been instrumental in promoting and distributing underground electronic music in the U.S.

On June 9, 1999, Metropolis bought the American industrial label, Pendragon Records. It assumed distribution responsibilities for Pendragon's back catalog, as well as that of 21st Circuitry, another industrial label which had gone out of business.
