= Alter Der Ruine =

Power noise group from Tucson, Arizona

- Origin: Tucson, Arizona, United States
- Genres: Synthpop, Electronic, Powernoise, Hardcore Techno
- Years active: 2005—present
- Labels: Sistinas Music, Crunch Pod, ProNoize, Negative Gain Productions
- Members: Mike Jenney; Mike Treveloni; Tamara Jenney
- Past members: Stuart Slimp; Xian Austin; Jacob Rouse; Robert Sidwell

Alter Der Ruine (German for: Age of the Ruin—as in: years of existence of a derelict building) is an internationally touring electronic act based out of Tucson, Arizona that began in 2005. They are known for their creative diversity and intense live shows. Their current sound is a blend of Synthpop, indie, and electro although they started as a Power noise act. Each release has seen new and sometimes drastic influences creep in leading to an ever-evolving sound.

== History ==
In 2007 the group was signed to Sistinas Music, expanded to four members and produced their second album State of Ruin, which features a remix by Assemblage 23.

In 2008, the third album was released by an industrial music label Crunch Pod based in California, USA. In 2009, the band released Beating a Dead Horse: The Relax And Ride It Single available as a free download from Vampire Freaks. In February 2010, a compilation album This is Why We Can’t Have Nice Things was released for Europe by a German label ProNoize.

Alter der Ruine signed to Negative Gain Productions in 2011. They released their fourth and fifth albums "Son of a Bitch" and "There's Always One More Son of a Bitch" as two thirds of a trilogy of records. The third album of the trilogy was self-released by Alter der Ruine as "I Told You Not To Listen Tonight Didn't I?", which consisted of B-sides from the other two albums.

== Band Breakup / Hiatus ==
The band announced they were done with a video posted on YouTube on January 4, 2012. An explanation followed later on the band's website announcing "The Gang Has Disbanded".

The band quietly reformed in 2013 by announcing the addition of new member Tamara. Their seventh album "I Will Remember It All Differently" is out on Negative Gain Productions.

== Other projects ==
The members of Alter Der Ruine are involved in numerous side projects, including the synthpop group Dust Is Noise (featuring Treveloni on vocals, Mike Jenney on drums, and Rouse on synthesizers)

Jenney also does live drumming for Kevorkian Death Cycle and Assemblage 23. He contributed percussion and performed additional production duties on Tranzendance, an album released in 2015 by Arizona darkwave/dreampop band Bella Lune.

== Discography ==
=== Albums ===
- The Ruine Process (2006)
- State of Ruin (2007) Sistinas Music
- State of Ruin Remixes (2007) Sistinas Music
- Giants From Far Away (2008) Crunch Pod
- This Is Why We Can't Have Nice Things (2010) ProNoize
- Son of a Bitch (2011) Negative Gain Productions
- There's Always One More Son of a Bitch (2012) Negative Gain Productions
- I Told You Not To Listen Tonight Didn't I? (2013)
- I Will Remember It All Differently (2014) Negative Gain Productions

=== EPs ===
- Something Old EP (2007)
- Something New EP (2007)

=== Singles ===
- Beating A Dead Horse: The Relax And Ride It Single (2009) Crunch Pod
- RLXRLXRLXRLX (2009)
- Keep the Devil Off Your Back (2012) Negative Gain Productions
- Bury It (2012) Negative Gain Productions

=== Compilations ===
- Das Bunker: Fear of a Distorted Planet (2006) Das Bunker
- Das Bunker: Bunker 54 (2007) Das Bunke, Mechanismz
- Deathkey: Songs in the Key of Death (2007) Crunch Pod
- Materia Fria (2007) Sistinas Music, Crunch Pod
- Endzeit Bunkertracks [Act III] (2007) Alfa Matrix

=== Remixes ===
- Inure - Sick (Alter Der Ruine Mix) Alfa Matrix
- Caustic - Emmanuel Lewis Handjob (Alter Der Ruine Remix)
- Helltrash - I Am the Enemy (Remix By Alter Der Ruine)
- To Mega Therion - The Sermon of Setekh (Pass the Collection Plate Mix)
- Autoclav 1.1 - Nothing But Pillow Teeth (Alter Der Ruine Remix) Hive Records
- W.A.S.T.E. - Omega 3 (ADR Remix)
- Caustic - Spaff Injection (Electro-Spaff Remix by ADR) Crunch Pod
- The Gothsicles - Nine Dudes Freaking Out (Nine Dudes Making Out Remixed by Alter der Ruine) WTII Records
