= W.A.S.T.E. (band) =

American band

- Origin: San Diego, California, United States
- Genres: Industrial, rhythmic noise
- Instruments: Synthesizers, Sequencing, Sampling
- Years active: 2003 – present
- Label: Vendetta Music
- Members: Vuxnut; Tyler Viscerine; Mekanao
- Website: Official Site; MySpace page

W.A.S.T.E.(We All Seek Total Entropy) is an American industrial/rhythmic noise band from San Diego, California, formed in 2003

The band was founded by artist/musician Vuxnut, and the current line-up features studio artists Tyler Viscerine of To Mega Therion and Mekanao of Embodi. W.A.S.T.E. currently has 3 studio albums, with multiple remixes and remasters both by themselves, as well as other artists in their genre, including Xotox, Alter Der Ruine, Combichrist, and others.

== The early years ==
W.A.S.T.E. was founded in San Diego, California. Vuxnut was traveling with his best friend, Theo Harper, when the two decided to collaborate on a shared musical vision. They had their first W.A.S.T.E. show in Los Angeles just two short months after deciding to make music professionally.

Later in 2003, their self-titled debut EP "W.A.S.T.E." was released on Aggrokulture records. This marked the beginning of W.A.S.T.E. in the underground rhythmic noise genre in Southern California. Rapidly, they followed up with their sophomore release "We All Seek Total Entropy" in 2004 on the Mechanismz label, alongside such acts as Fusionwerks and Embodi (Mekanao's project). This album was reviewed by Grave Concerns Magazine. This album featured the original track "Shut Up And Bleed", which would be remixed later and featured on the soundtrack to The Collector.

== Album releases ==
Alongside touring, W.A.S.T.E. releases another full-length album with Sistinas Music in 2006, titled "This Is What We Seek". This marked the evolution of W.A.S.T.E. as their artistic expression and potential was realized. The fluid dance-like rhythm of tracks such as Electric Beatdown Bitch and Eternal were complemented by sheer energy-infused songs such as Toxic Shock and Shut Up And Bleed (which was remixed on the album by Combichrist, and later featured during the opening credits of The Collector). W.A.S.T.E. mixes rhythmic noise, dark ambient, power electronics, and extremely harsh yet danceable industrial.

In 2007, W.A.S.T.E. releases Violent Delights, also on Sistinas Music. With the genre growing, more artists contributed to remixing tracks on this album, including Embodi's remix of Electric Beatdown Bitch and To Mega Therion's remix of Omega 3. The album's title track contains even more of the energy-filled, rage-infused efforts as the previous albums. W.A.S.T.E. seemed to have taken on a much darker overtone with this album.

In 2008, W.A.S.T.E. signed to Vendetta Music, and released "A Silent Mantra Of Rage" in late 2009. With over 25 tracks, this was a 2-disc project. The first disc contained new tracks for the album, including tracks such as War Never Changes, The Beast, and the title track. The second disc contains over 15 remixes of both new and old W.A.S.T.E. material. These were remixed by artists such as Combichrist, Caustic, Xotox, and many others.

'Liquor, Drugs and Hate' was released on Vendetta Music in November 2011.

'Warlord Mentality' was released on Vendetta Music late in 2014

== Style and themes ==
W.A.S.T.E. draws heavy inspiration from Electronica, Industrial, Rhythmic Noise, and Dark Ambient music. Vuxnut's overarching theme of humanity heading into entropy (an inevitable social decline and degeneration) has remained through all his studio albums.
