= Opāru (musician) =

American musician and singer

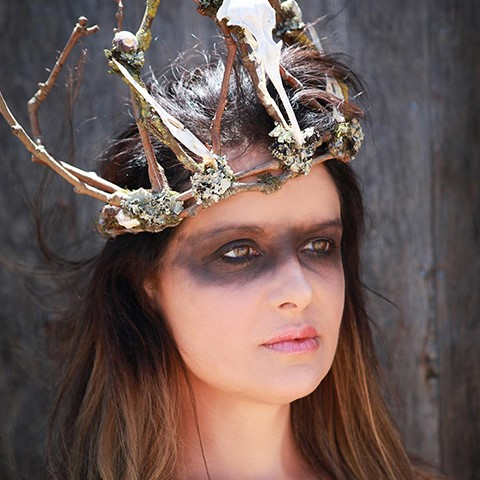
- Opāru (Dianna St. Hilaire)

Background information
- Born: Dianna Marie St. Hilaire; Modesto, California
- Origin: Los Angeles, California
- Occupation: Musician
- Years active: 2001–present
- Label: Evileye Records
- Website: www.oparumusic.com

Dianna Marie St. Hilaire, better known as Opāru, is an American actor, singer and composer from Los Angeles, California. She was born in Modesto, California and grew up in Albuquerque, New Mexico. Her genre is Dark Electro Pop, Pop, and Ethereal.

Teaching herself how to read music and play the piano at age 8, she spent most of her younger years in school choirs and friends bands. She temporarily gave up the idea of pursuing music, but began to write again at age 18 after leaving home.

In 2001 she was in the movie Lockdown. Actress Dianna St. Hilaire, created Versailles Suicide in 2001 and later changed the name in 2003 to Versailles.

In 2015 St. Hilaire started a new project Opāru, the name derived from the Japanese name of the birthstone opal.

== Early work ==
In 2002 Versailles created a four-song demo under the name Versailles Suicide called Fallen Angel, written by Dianna St. Hilaire and produced by Mike White. A track from this album, "Little Dead Kitten", was included on the compilation CD Burque Love 4.

In 2003 Dianna changed the name to Versailles, releasing the gothic/industrial full-length album Live Your Life released on Dianna’s own label, Evileye Records. That same year Versailles took her project into an even more industrial sound, leading to the release of Kiss on the Evileye label.

In 2004, during Versailles' time in Los Angeles, she changed her sound blending her original Darkwave sound with classical piano. She was then labeled "The Gothic Tori Amos". She created a backup band with members Rod Arias and Andy Bettis. That year she was on the Dirty Dave Talk Show on KCLA, performed the LA Music Awards Showcase, and was on the Scary Perry Show – The Comedy Pure Rock Resurrection, a talk show featuring Perry Caravello from the movie Windy City Heat.

In 2005, she released a four-song EP called Believe, placing her in the pop/rock genre. This included three tracks and a remix track of the song "Believe". In Jennifer Layton's Indie Music Review of "Believe", she wrote "Versailles is a dark pop mistress with gothic influences and a voice that can be breathy and innocent even when she’s rasping and pleading and crying out to the heavens". In 2005 she was also a nominee in the 2005 Rock City Music Awards for Outstanding Solo Artist.

== Cleopatra Records ==
In 2005 Versailles was approached and asked to do a song for the Cleopatra Records compilation A Gothic Acoustic Tribute To Nine Inch Nails. For this album she covered the song "Something I Can Never Have". This was followed by two more releases on Cleopatra Records: A Tribute To She Wants Revenge in 2006, covering the song "She Loves Me, She Loves Me Not", and A Tribute To The Smiths in 2007 covering "What Difference Does It Make?", both produced by Gregory Butler. Later she was placed on the Cleopatra release Gothic Divas 2007.

== Broken Dolls ==
In 2008 Versailles released the full-length CD Broken Dolls on her label Evileye Records. This album featured a cover of "Jane Says" by Jane's Addiction. Off this CD the track "Wendy’s Razorblades" is featured in Unscene Magazine Issue 7 compilation CD. This CD also prompted two US tours: the "Broken Dolls Tour" in summer and a fall tour as a supporting act for Metropolis bands Bella Morte and Ego Likeness in 2009, where she played a Vampire Ball.

== Trademark ==
In 2008 Versailles forced the Japanese band Versailles to change their name to Versailles Philharmonic Quintet. Dianna St. Hilaire had registered the US Trademark. She sent a letter to them from her lawyer telling them to stop using it in the United States.

== 2010 ==
In 2010 Versailles released the EP Wendy’s Razorblades written and produced by Dianna and released on her label Evileye Records. She was also on Songs To Die For, a compilation CD released by Darkest Jack. This CD features live versions of "Massacre" and "Wendy’s Razorblades".

== BFM Digital ==
In 2011 Versailles evolved her sound again, making the synthpop/dance EP Sacrifice using influences of Depeche Mode and Joy Division. This album was distributed through BFM Digital. Versailles played the Keytar, and she added Stephanie Rose on bass and Marie Ilene on drums to create an all-female band. The CD was produced by Eric Greedy. The song "Sacrifice" has been featured on KROQ: Rodney On The Rox.

== Years 2012 to 2015 ==
In 2012 Versailles released the full-length CD Pages. This album has songs from Broken Dolls, Sacrifice, and Wendy’s Razorblades, and it was listed on the 55th Grammy ballot. That year she was also on The Gothy Horror Picture Show, doing a cover of "Eddie’s Teddy" from The Rocky Horror Picture Show released by Darkest Jack.

In 2012 Versailles was featured in the Kim Fowley movie Black Room Doom. This movie was given the special Jury Prize at the 13th Annual Melbourne Underground Film Festival.

In 2013 Versailles released a new CD Targets, co-written and produced by Kim Fowley. This album features a new sound with writers Severa Miles and Noizee. This CD is referred to as bubble gum/Euro rock & pop.

St. Hilaire has shared the stage with Voltaire, Kim Fowley, Ego Likeness, Bella Morte, New Model Army, Modwheelmood, Hellblinki, Demonika & The Darklings, Bella Lune, Peeling Grey, and many others.

== St. Hilaire as Opāru ==
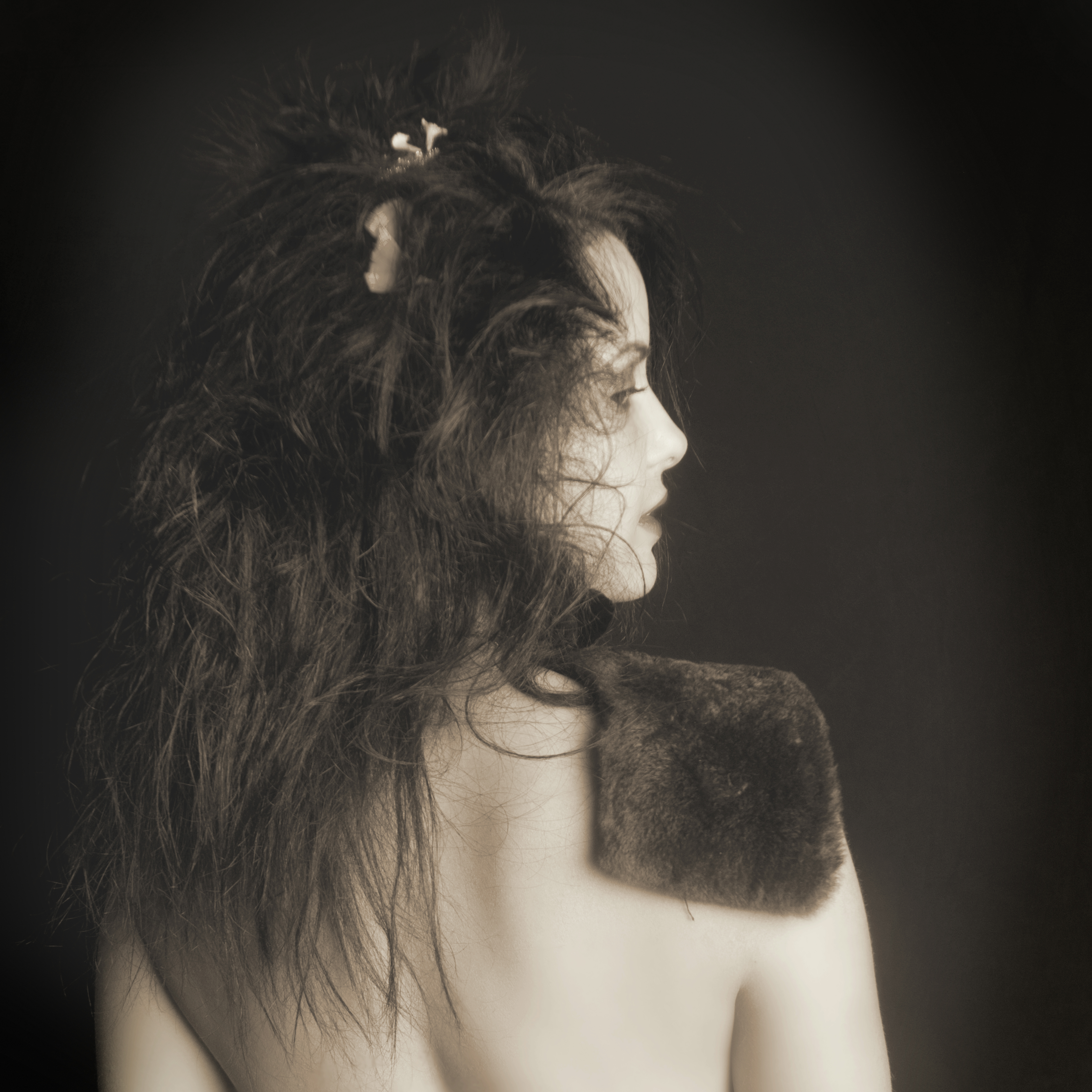
Opāru, 2021

St. Hilaire’s debut song as Opāru was released in December 2016. St. Hilaire and Josh Stevens created the song “Remember Me”.

Opāru followed this in December 2019 with ‘Ghost To Follow’.

Opāru currently works with music libraries and agencies Megatrax, Mpath, APM, Madden Flow, Two Oh Six Music, For Goodness Sync, Unicorn Sync, World Fusion Music Productions, 722 Sync, What Up Pitches, Auribus, EMI, and Universal Music Group.

== Discography ==
=== Studio albums ===
- Live Your Life, 2003
- Broken Dolls, 2008
- Pages, 2012
- Targets, 2013

=== EPs ===
- Fallen Angel, 2002; Demo
- Kiss, 2003
- Believe, 2005
- Wendy's Razorblades, 2010
- Sacrifice, 2011
- Love Me, 2019
- Heart’s In A War, 2021
- Gold, 2022

=== Singles ===
- Remember Me, 2016
- The Deep End, 2017
- Ghost To Follow, 2018
- September Storm, 2020
- I’ll Rise Up, 2020
- We Are Eternity, 2021
- Queen, 2021
- I Never Told You, 2021
- Three Little Birds (Bob Marley Cover), 2021
- Hold On, 2021
- Free, 2021
- The Other Side, 2021
- We Will, 2022
- Empire, 2022
- Limitless, 2023

== Compilation appearances ==
- Burque Love 4
- A Gothic Acoustic Tribute to NIN
- Gothic Divas
- A Tribute to She Wants Revenge
- Stop Me If You Think You've Heard This One Before" A Tribute to The Smiths
- Unscene Magazine Compilation CD
- Darkest Hours- Songs To Die For
- Gothy Horror Picture Show
- "Dark Spy Compilation 41"
- Phenomenal Women Volume 8 (September Storm), 2020
- Eternity (We Are Eternity), 2021
- High On Life (I Never Told You So), 2021
- High On Life (Queen), 2021
