= NESferatu =

Studio album by The Gothsicles
- Released: 2006
- Genre: Electronic, gothic, comedy
- Length: 46:27
- Label: Sonic Mainline Records
- Producer: Turbo Gothic 16 (Dan Clark)

The Gothsicles chronology
Etherblister EP (2003)	NESferatu (2006)	NESferaTWO (2009)

NESferatu is the first album by The Gothsicles, released after their debut EP Etherblister. NESferatu was released in September 2006, on Sonic Mainline Records. Themes in the album are diverse and often comedic. Wrote critic Aaron Coats of Inside Pulse, "seventy percent sarcasm and thirty percent absurdity, this amusing album is both an ode to the goth cliche and a tribute to 8-bit gaming."

== Production and themes ==
Themes are diverse and often humorous, often relating to video games or subcultures. The album's track "Triple Shot" is about the maximum powerup in Galaga, while "One Second Ghost" is about the short invincibility experienced after taking damage in most platform games. Other songs reference games such as Konami Code, while "Turn Signals Are Still Cool" explains that turn signals are not optional. "I Can Tell You Shop At Hot(t) Topic" explains the ease of determining that one bought their clothes at Hot Topic. "Hey, I've Got That Font" is about the large collection of fonts the singer has, while "Better Versions by Other People" is a short song explaining that the next 4 songs are remixes of other songs on the album. "Platform Game" is a live performance. Song is not listed on album. "Theme to Full House" is another unlisted live performance. Cover of the theme song to Full House, by Jesse Fredrick.

== Reception ==
Professional ratings
Review scores
Source	Rating
NUVO	(positive)

According to a review in Local Sounds Magazine, "this CD is one of the few examples of dark electronic comedy out there." Wrote critic Aaron Coats of Inside Pulse, "Seventy percent sarcasm and thirty percent absurdity, this amusing album is both an ode to the goth cliche and a tribute to 8-bit gaming." Wrote Leslie Benson of NUVO in a positive review, "With video game clips and Pulp Fiction samples, some EBM beats and a Saved by the Bell’s Screech kind of lyrical comedy, the album even pokes fun at itself."

== Track listing ==
1. "I Can Tell You Shop At Hot(t) Topic" – 1:07
2. "Triple Shot" - 3:17
3. "Konami Code IV" - 3:00
4. "Turn Signals Are Still Cool" - 3:22
5. "One Second Ghost" - 3:34
6. "English License 2.0" - 3:34
7. "Hey, I've Got That Font" - 3:45
8. "Mix this Song into A23's 'Maps of Reality'" - 3:18
9. "Better Versions by Other People - 0:50
10. "Konami Code (Hi-Score RMX)" - 3:37
11. "Turn Signals are Still Cool (Pimp My Rhyme Mix by Caustic)" - 3:34
12. "Konami Code (Epsilon Minus remix) - 4:19
13. "One Second Ghost (Sore Thumbs Mix by Stochastic Theory) - 4:39
14. "Lunch Breakin'" - 0:59
15. "Blip to be Squarewave" - 1:20
16. Platform Game (unlisted live performance) - 0:43
17. Theme to Full House (unlisted live performance) - 1:29
