= The Gothsicles =

American industrial and electronic body music band

- Origin: Madison, Wisconsin; Chicago, Illinois; Boston, Massachusetts
- Genres: Electronic body music (EBM), industrial, powernoise, dark electro
- Years active: 2002–present
- Labels: Tigersquawk Records, Negative Gain Productions, WTII Records, Sonic Mainline Records
- Members: Brian Graupner
- Website: thegothsicles.com

The Gothsicles is an American industrial and electronic body music (EBM) band formerly based out of Chicago, Illinois before moving to Boston, Massachusetts in 2018. The group was formed in Wisconsin in 2002 by Brian "darkNES" Graupner, who handles vocals and synthesizers, and is the sole consistent member. The band has a rotating lineup of live musicians, including Matt Fanale of Caustic, Matt Slegel of Angelspit, and David Dodson of Abstinence. The band released its first LP, NESferatu, in 2006. Following albums included Sega Lugosi's Dead (2009), Industrialites & Magic (2011), Squid Icarus (2014), and I Feel Sicle, which was released on November 4, 2016. According to COMA Music Magazine, "The Gothsicles are one of the forerunners in Industrial Music for the Nerdy Masses."

Known for "spastic" and energetic live performances, they have performed at major festivals such as Infest, Kinetik Festival, Resistanz, Game On Expo, Reverence Festival, Terminus Festival, Cold Waves Festival, and Mechanismus Festival. The band has had songs remixed by artists such as Leæther Strip, Project Pitchfork, Neuroticfish and Pankow. Side projects include The Causticles, a collaboration with Caustic, Hardcore Pong with Angelspit, and the weekly internet talk show Space Couch..

== History ==
=== 2002-05: Founding ===
The Gothsicles was first formed around 2002 as an industrial and electronic body music (EBM) band in Madison, Wisconsin. Later based in Chicago, Illinois, members include Brian "darkNES" Graupner (vocals, synthesizers), plus a rotating lineup of live musician that has included Matt "Sega Lugosi" Fanale (vocals), and Dan "Turbo Gothic 16" Clark (production, programming).

The Gothsicles officially started June 24, 2002 when The Gothsicles’ entry in a remix contest for the band Freezepop was selected as a winner Founding member Graupner, who writes the majority of their lyrics, had long been interested in diverse music genres. After being exposed to industrial and EBM in high school, he had become an avid fan of bands such as And One, who according to Graupner "sort of proved you could make goofy industrial music work." The band's name was chosen because Graupner found it "hilarious" in college. In 2003 The Gothsicles self-released the EP Etherblisster, and over the next several years performed the songs at festivals such as Reverence.

=== 2006-09: NESferatu ===
Produced by Dan Clark of The Dark Clan, NESferatu is the first full-length album by The Gothsicles. Released in September 2006 on Sonic Mainline Records, the album's diverse themes include platform games, Konami, type fonts, and the importance of using turn signals. The end of the album includes remixes by artists such as Epsilon Minus, a Canadian techno duo that briefly reformed for the remix. According to Local Sounds Magazine, "this CD is one of the few examples of dark electronic comedy out there." Wrote critic Aaron Coats of Inside Pulse, "seventy percent sarcasm and thirty percent absurdity, this amusing album is both an ode to the goth cliche and a tribute to 8-bit gaming." Wrote Leslie Benson of NUVO in a positive review, "with video game clips and Pulp Fiction samples, some EBM beats and a Saved by the Bell’s Screech kind of lyrical comedy, the album even pokes fun at itself." The band toured in support of the album, and a free remix CD, NESferaTWO, was released on February 23, 2009.

"It may seem silly to use the term 'matured,' given the nature of their music, but The Gothsicles have done just that. It's apparent right from the start with 'Infl8-R' that the level of production has gone way up. Not that there was anything wrong with what we heard on NESferatu, but with this album the band opens up the floodgates of sound and assaults you with some serious EBM arrangements, as well as the more traditional 8-bit synth lines."
— Plastiksickness

The Chicago-based WTII Records signed the band in 2008, and their first album on WTII, Sega Lugosi's Dead, was released on March 31, 2009. Produced with help from Andrew Sega of Iris, it features artwork by Bogart Shwadchuck and Vlad McNeally. Plastiksickness called the album "matured," praising the production and "serious EBM arrangements." In April 2011 they played music from the album at the first Resistanz Festival, held in Sheffield. Wrote Sound Sphere Magazine about the show, "the riotously funny Gothsicles... proudly displayed their geek chic and love of retro games consoles with hits like ‘Konami Code IV’ and ‘One Second Ghost’. This notoriously nerdy group really riled the crowd into a frenzy."

=== 2011-14: Industrialites & Magic and Squid Icarus ===
Released on August 9, 2011 on WTII Records, their third album Industrialites & Magic was again written by Brian Graupner, with Dan Clark producing most tracks. The album features guest vocals from Caustic, Xuberx and Critical System Error. Like their previous releases, the end of the album has remixes by groups such as Leather Strip, Caustic, and Yendri, Boole. Topics were again diverse, and their track "Save That Mermaid" is a reference to The Goonies II video game. The album peaked at No. 1 at Amazon.com in the "Goth and Industrial" category for most downloaded album. A music video for "Save That Mermaid" was released in August 2011, and was named Video of the Day by COMA Music Magazine.

External videos
- The Gothsicles - "Save Dat Mermaid" (2011 official music video)
- The Gothsicles - "Ultrasweaty" (2014 official music video)
- The Gothsicles - "4 Fat Guys" (2016 official music video)
- The Gothsicles - "IDDQD (2018 official music video)

As of early 2014, Graupner confirmed he'd completed an album that he called "the best thing I've ever done." The Gothsicles' 2014 album Squid Icarus came out on December 15, 2014 on Negative Gain Productions, after a Kickstarter campaign. The album has features by Angelspit and Cyferdyne, and the artwork was created with the help of Angelspit and fashion photographer Emily Gualdoni. Brutal Resonance called the album "brilliant," praising the production value by guest producers such as Assemblage 23, Faderhead, Rotersand, Christ Analogue, and Haujobb. Intravenous Magazine described the album as a "love letter to geek culture," and "their most club-friendly and well-rounded outing to date. The classic Gothsicle elements are all present such as Graupner's bat-shit crazy vocals, the 8-bit leads, and of course more nerdy nods than anyone would rightly admit to getting." According to IDie:YouDie, the album "definitely feels like the best transference of the band’s live energy over to record we’ve yet heard."

=== 2015-16: I Feel Sicle ===
Two remix EPs followed the release of Squid Icarus. The Nyarlat Hot EP was released January 20, 2015 for WTII Records and featured remixes by God Module, Project F, as well as new original material. Squid Remixarus was released a year later on January 26 of 2016, featuring remix work from Beborn Beton, Kevin MacLeod, and Avarice in Audio.

November 4, 2016, marked the release of The Gothsicles’ 5th full-length album, “I Feel Sicle”. Of this album, Brutal Resonance said “Graupner and friends have cranked out another hilarious, 8-bit induced album with a couple of wonderful collaborations and dance floor hits.”

=== 2017-18: SIC REMIXES, Konami Code 20th Anniversary EP, and Tigersquawk Records ===
A remix EP companion to I Feel Sicle, SIC REMIXES was released April 13, 2017, boasting remix work from several artists in including Neuroticfish, E-Craft, and Null Device. Said, IDie:YouDie, "Two unlikely great tastes that taste amazingly great together, did you ever think you would hear frigging Neuroticfish remix the ‘Sicles? We never did, but now that it’s arrived we are amped."

SIC REMIXES also initiated the founding of Graupner’s own record label, Tigersquawk Records.

2017 also saw the formation of the side-project, Gasoline Invertebrate, and its Freak Drive EP. A Kickstarter campaign was launched for this release and funded within three hours.

The coming of 2018 marked 20 years since the group’s single, Konami Code, was originally penned in 1998 for Graupner’s first solo electronic act, Sleeping Disorder. To commemorate this, the Konami Code 20 Year Anniversary EP was released on April 6, featuring remixes from acts such as Pankow and Studio-X, as well as a video for the new original track, IDDQD. The Gothsicles’ relocation from Chicago to Boston was also chronicled with the song, "The Gothsicles Are Moving to Boston in May of 2018".

== Touring ==
Beyond regularly touring in Wisconsin and Illinois, since 2003 the band has performed at a number of major festivals. They were frequent performers at the Reverence Festival held in Madison, Wisconsin, appearing from 2004 to 2009. Other early notable shows include GenCon from 2004 to 2007, CONvergence from 2006 to 2007, and MarsCon 2006 to 2008. They were on stage with Caustic at the Indoctrination Festival in Chicago in 2006, and were the opening act at the British alternative event Infest 2007, where they were reviewed positively by the BBC. Also in 2007 they performed at Eccentrik Festival, a goth and industrial festival in Raleigh, North Carolina, and appeared at the final rendition of Blacksun Festival in New Haven, Connecticut.

In March 2009 the band embarked on the Vampirefreaks.com 'It Ain't Dead Yet Tour' with Caustic and Pr0metheus Burning. They toured 12 cities in a period of 2 weeks which spanned across the Midwest and East Coast. They performed at the Kinetik Festival in 2010 in Montreal, also writing the song "Holy Shit We're Playing Kinetik!" for the occasion. The band also wrote a song dedicated to their first performance at Resistanz Festival, to be included on the festival's compilation CD. Explained Graupner, "When festivals of that caliber want me on their bill, I get amazingly effin’ pumped and those songs are the result. It would be dishonest of me to write any other kind of track for those comps." They have performed three times at the Montreal industrial music festival C.O.M.A., appearing in 2010, 2012, and 2013. In late 2012 The Gothsicles undertook a tour of the United States with bands such as Deviant UK, for all the emptiness, Die Sektor. In June 2013 they performed at Terminus Festival, and in the summer of 2014 toured Canada as part of the Minitour with for all the emptiness and Hätz.

2015 saw a nationwide, coast to coast U.S. tour in support of Squid Icarus with Angelspit.

In 2016, The Gothsicles headlined the last night of Sheffield, England’s final Resistanz Festival and commemorated the event with the release of the song “One of the Last Bands Ever To Play Resistanz Festival”, a complete to their initial song for the event, “The First Band Ever to Play Resistanz Festival”, released in 2011.

The Gothsicles were also the featured band on the annual Gothic Cruise, bound in 2016 for Alaska. For this event, The band released “The Gothic Cruise to Alaska 2016 Juneau Reactor EP” (a play on electronic band, Juno Reactor).

2017 marked a banner year for live performance with slots on Milwaukee's Sanctuary Festival, a return to the Terminus Festival, Chicago's Cold Waves Festival, and MAGFest presents: Game Over Richmond. The Gothsicles also completed their first European tour with gigs in Helsinki, Reykjavik and a headlining slot at London's Beat:Cancer Festival. The band returned to the Sanctuary Festival in 2018 and appeared at Seattle's Mechanismus Festival.

== Side projects, vlog ==
The Gothsicles frequently collaborate with other musicians and have formed various side projects, including

- Space Couch, a weekly talk show simulcast live over the internet
- Space Couch Podcast, audio from the live show repackaged in podcast form
- Tigersquawk Records, a record label headed by Graupner
- The Causticles, a collaboration with Caustic
- The Nightsicles, a collaboration with Finnish synthwave band, NightStop
- Crudmouth, 90s-style grunge band with Cory Gorski of Canadian electronic band, Volt 9000
- Gasoline Invertebrate, a dark industrial project that has spawned two EPs
- Hardcore Pong, a video-game themed collaboration with Australian group, Angelspit
- Dinosaur Tank, a chip-tune project
- Khionik, a collaboration with Roanoke, VA-based artist, Syrinx
- DJ Fishdick, Graupner's Creature From The Black Lagoon-based DJ persona
- False Edge, a collaboration with Chicago artist, Death 0f Self
- Gothsticulate, which involves Caustic and Geoff Lee's EDM project Modulate
- Noiseferatu, 2015 touring project with Angelspit and The Dead Room, offering a live scoring of the silent film classic, Nosferatu

== Style and equipment ==
Style and influences

The Gothsicles are known for blending various electronic genres, particularly industrial music, electronic body music, and industrial offshoots such as dark electro. COMA Music Magazine wrote that the band creates "oddball EBM" that's "fun, loud and entertaining." Graupner has cited artists such as Atom and his Package, "Weird Al" Yankovic, and Neotek as influences. Though the band's songs address diverse and often random topics, lyrics regularly reference the classic NES console and games such as Contra, River City Ransom, and Goonies II.

Live shows and equipment

Their "spastic" live shows are energetic and often include visual elements such as video. The live band consists of Brian Graupner and a rotating lineup of musicians such as Matt Fanale, with occasional guest production from artists such as Dan Clark.

== Members ==
=== Studio and live ===
- Brian "darkNES" Graupner (2002–present) - vocals, synthesizers, songwriting

=== Live members ===
Current as of 2022

- Matt Slegel
- Hari Garou
- Steven Saunders
- Mikey Hell
- Brian Absence
- Mike Jenney
- Brendin Ross
- Dan Clark
- Josev F
- Matt Fanale
- Edwin Locke
- Syrinx
- Thomas Howell
- DOS://Boot
- Bogart Shwadchuck
- Kristian Melegi
- Karl Learmont
- Keef Baker
- JL
- Brad Perkins
- Johnathan Reveles
- Alex McKay
- Psyence Fiction
- Sebastien L'Arrivée
- Damion Champe
- DJ emanon
- Bjarki Þór Guðmundsson
- Jon Billian
- Isaac Rosenthal
- Adam Powell
- Deftly-D
- Stephen Eckstein
- Rick Furr
- Ryan Rasmussen
- Colin Kelly
- Eric Kristoffer

== Discography ==
=== Albums ===
Albums by The Gothsicles
Year	Album title	Release details
2006	NESferatu	Released: Oct 23, 2006; Label: Sonic Mainline Records; Format: CD, digital
2009	Sega Lugosi’s Dead	Released: Mar 31, 2009; Label: WTII Records; Format: CD, digital
2011	Industrialites & Magic	Released: Aug 9, 2011; Label: WTII Records; Format: CD, digital
2014	Squid Icarus	Released: Dec 15, 2014; Label: Negative Gain Productions; Format: CD, digital
2016	Squid Remixarus	Released: Jan 26, 2016; Format: CD, digital
2016	I Feel Sicle	Released: Nov 4, 2016; Label: Negative Gain Productions; Format: CD, digital
2017	SIC REMIXES	Released: April 13, 2017; Label: Tigersquawk Records; Format: digital
2021	Animal Songs	Released: February 26, 2021; Label: Tigersquawk Records; Format: digital, vinyl
2021	Animal Addendum	Released: July 2, 2021; Label: Tigersquawk Records; Format: digital

=== Extended plays ===
EPs by The Gothsicles
Year	Album title	Release details
2003	Etherblisster	Released: 2003; Label: Self-released; Format: CD, digital
2009	NESferaTWO	Released: Feb 23, 2009; Label: WTII Records; Format: Digital
2012	AXE BATTLE: A Remix EP	Released: Oct 11, 2012; Label: Groupees.com; Format: Digital
2014	Songs From the De-EP	Released: Apr 14, 2014; Label: Undustrial Records; Format: Digital
2015	The Nyarlat Hot EP	Released: Jan 20, 2015; Label: WTII Records; Format: Digital
2016	The Gothic Cruise to Alaska 2016 Juneau Reactor EP	Released: Aug 20, 2016; Format: Digital
2017	The Terminus Festival 2017 EP	Released: Jun 30, 2017; Label: Tigersquawk Records; Format: Digital
2017	The Cold Waves Festival 2017 EP	Released: Sep 4, 2017; Label: Tigersquawk Records; Format: Digital
2018	Konami Code 20th Anniversary EP	Released: Apr 6, 2018; Label: Tigersquawk Records; Format: Digital
2018	The Mechanismus Festival EP	Released: Apr 25, 2018; Label: Tigersquawk Records; Format: Digital

=== Singles ===
Selected songs by The Gothsicles
Year	Title	Album	Release details
2003	"Konami Code III (Revolution)"	Ehterblisster EP	Self-released (2003)
2004	"Daisy Chain 4 Satan (TKK cover)"	Single only	Self-released (Oct 2004)
2005	"Theme From 'So You've Decided To Become A Goth'"	Single only	Self-released (May 3, 2007)
2006	"Konami Code"	NESferatu	Sonic Mainline (Oct 23, 2006)
2007	"Holy Shit, We're Playing Infest!"	Single only	Self-released (Oct. 2007)
2009	"Nine Dudes Freaking Out"	Sega Lugosi's Dead	WTII (Mar 31, 2009)
2009	"Everyone Should Play V : TES ('Cause Somebody's Gotta Be Worse Than Me)" (ft. Ben Peal)	Single only	Self-released (Nov. 15, 2009)
2011	"Save Dat Mermaid"	Industrialites & Magic	Music video (Aug 2011)
2013	"Terminus Festival Is Gonna Be Awesome" (ft. Panic Lift)	Single only	Self-released (Jun 25, 2013)
2014	"Ultrasweaty"	Squid Icarus	Music video (Dec 2014)
2016	"Chica Vampiro feat. MC Lars and Rodney Anonymous of The Dead Milkmen"	Single only	Self-released (January 15, 2016)
2016	"Straight Up Otter Time"	I Feel Sicle	Negative Gain Productions (November 4, 2016)
2016	"4 Fat Guys"	I Feel Sicle	Music video (December, 2016)
2018	"IDDQD"	Konami Code 20th Anniversary EP	Music video (April, 2018)

=== Compilations ===
Selected compilations featuring songs by The Gothsicles
Year	Single name	Album	Release details
2008	"DEATHKEY"	Songs In The Key Of Death: A Deathkey Compilation	Sonic Mainline
2010	"Holy Shit, We're Playing Kinetik"	Kinetik Festival Volume Three	Kinetik
2010	"Jim, Let Me Know When You Can Drink Again (Extreme Party Stylezz)"	Electronic Saviors: Industrial Music to Cure Cancer	Metropolis (Feb 9, 2010)
2011	"The First Band Ever To Play Resistanz Festival (We're #1)"	Resistanz - International Industrial Music Festival	Resistanz
2012	"Who Wants To Join Our Superhero Team, Right Now It's Just Me And Jim"	Electronic Saviors Volume 2: Recurrence	Metropolis (May 8, 2012)
2012	"This Year's Password is 'Party'"	Kinetik Festival Volume Five	Kinetik
2013	"3rd Original Kinetik Track (Americans On Rev)"	Kinetik Festival Volume 5.5	Kinetik
2016	"One Of The Last Bands Ever To Play Resistanz Festival (We're #104)"	Resistanz Festival Soundtrack 2016	Resistanz
2017	"Cold Front"	COLD WAVES VI COMPILATION CD	Cold Waves
2017	"Harder, Blacker, Graupner (vs. ESA)"	Beat:Cancer Festival v1.0	Beat:Cancer
2017	"Straight Up Otter Time (Retro Space Otter Remix by Banshee)"	BEAST WARS - Electric Bat vs Tigersquawk	Tigersquawk
2018	"Konami Code (Death of Self Ruins Another Gothsicles Song Remix)"	Undustrial Records vs. Tigersquawk Records	Tigersquawk

=== Remixes by The Gothsicles ===
Selected remixes by The Gothsicles, with date of remix release
Year	Title	Original artist	Album	Release details
2012	"Idol (Poison Control Mix By The Gothsicles)"	Darker Days Tomorrow	Single only	Erisian Records (Mar 13, 2012)
2012	"Empty (Jam Master Cleanse Remix by The Gothsicles)"	Death of Self	Bugs Crawling out of People	Apr. 6, 2012
2012	"Best I Can Do (Best of Madtown Electro-Synth Part 2 Rmx By the Gothsicles)"	Stochastic Theory	Single only	Self-released (Sep. 18, 2012)
2013	"Cephalopod (Incompetechno rmx by The Gothsicles)"	Kevin MacLeod	Single only	Self-released (Jan. 7, 2013)
2014	"Cracks Start To Show (Battle Armor Skeletor rmx by The Gothsicles)"	Deviant UK	AnalogueTrash Records: Label Sampler Vol. 1	AnalogueTrash Records (Dec. 10, 2014)
2014	"Product (Unit G rmx by The Gothsicles)"	Projekt F	Under the Skin	Dec 19, 2014
2015	"2 Headlights Appears On The Road (Americanthropy remix by The Gothsicles)"	Obszön Geschöpf	15 Years of Bloody Nightmares	June 25, 2015
2016	"Bomb the Clubs (Club the Bombs Mix by The Gothsicles)"	Caustic	Bomb the Club Mixes Maxi-Single	March 22, 2016
2016	"Greed (Acquisitioned by The Gothsicles)"	Gild the Mourn	I-VIII Deluxe Edition	October 26, 2016
2017	"Vortex (The Gothsicles Remix) "	Antibody	Opera Of Death	February 3, 2017
2017	"Stardust (Starry Wisdom Remix by The Gothsicles)"	Curse of Cassandra	Single only	March 3, 2017
2017	"Murder (Malice, A Floor Thought rmx by the Gothsicles)"	The Rain Within	Murder : Dismembered	March 10, 2017
2017	"Chicago (The .22 Bus Mix by The Gothsicles)"	project .44	Murder Weapon/Forty Four Double A Side Single	June 1, 2017
2017	"Shark Club GOTHSICLES Remix"	Squid Lid	SHARK CLUB REMIXZ	June 1, 2017
2018	"Modern Day Privateers (The Gothsicles Remix)"	...And We All Die	Modern Day Privateers (Remixes) + Outtakes	March 23, 2018
2018	"Good Girl (Evaluate and Rank Me Remix by The Gothsicles)"	Isserley	Sad Girls Club Vol. 2	Tigersquawk Records (March 24, 2018)
2018	"I, Weapon (Thinktank remix by The Gothsicles)"	Angelspit	PUNCTURE MARKS (Black Dog Bite Remix Album)	April 1, 2018
2018	"BIOS (Refragmentation Remix by The Gothsicles)"	BloodWerks	Electronic Saviors Vol. 5: Remembrance	Metropolis Records (June 8, 2018)
2018	"Another Fucking Love Song - The Gothsicles Lovesicle Mix"	Go Fight	Another Fucking Love Song	August 25, 2018
2019	"Shock and Awe (Boston Dyna-Mix by The Gothsicles)"	Big Time Kill	Shock and Awe - The Remixes	January 21, 2018

=== Remixes of The Gothsicles ===
Selected remixes of The Gothsicles songs, with date of remix release
Year	Title	Remixer	Album	Release details
2007	"Konami Code (Epsilon Minus Remix)"	Epsilon Minus	NESferatu	Dec 12, 2007
2009	"Nine Dudes Freaking Out (Alter Der Ruine Remix)"	Alter Der Ruine	Sega Lugosi's; Dead	WTII (Mar 31, 2009)
2009	"Nine Dudes Freaking Out (Boole Remix)"	Boole	Sega Lugosi's; Dead	WTII (Mar 31, 2009)
2009	"I Thought The CD Player Was Skipping... But It Was Just a Cyanotic Song (Cyanotic Remix)"	Cyanotic	Sega Lugosi's; Dead	WTII (Mar 31, 2009)
2011	"My Guy Died (Boole Remix)"	Boole	Industrialites & Magic	WTII (Aug 9, 2011)
2015	"Death Touch (VanDamnanator Mix by God Module)"	God Module	Nyarlat Hot EP	WTII (Jan 20, 2015)
2015	"Death Touch (God Van Dammet Remix by BALLPEEN)"	BALLPEEN	Nyarlat Hot EP	WTII (Jan 20, 2015)
2015	"On Another Plane (F_cked by Projekt F"	Projekt F	Nyarlat Hot EP	WTII (Jan 20, 2015)
2016	"Sword Cane (coldcut by Michael B Wagner of Beborn Beton)"	Beborn Beton	Squid Remixarus	Jan 26, 2016
2017	"Unbekannt in Deutschland (Neuroticfish RMX)"	Neuroticfish	SIC REMIXES	Tigersquawk (Apr 26, 2017)
2017	"Unbekannt in Deutschland (E-Craft remix)"	E-Craft	SIC REMIXES	Tigersquawk (Apr 26, 2017)
2017	"Cold Front (Gost Remix)"	Gost	The Cold Waves Festival 2017 EP	Tigersquawk (Sep 4, 2017)
2018	"Konami Code (fm_П_rmx by Pankow)"	Pankow	Konami Code 20th Anniversary EP	Tigersquawk (Apr 6, 2018)
2018	"Konami Code (Studio-X Remix)"	Studio-X	Konami Code 20th Anniversary EP	Tigersquawk (Apr 6, 2018)

== See also ==
- Industrial music
