= Gothic Cruise =

American electronic music festival

- Genre: Electronic music
- Years active: 1989–present
- Founders: Zaida Browne of All Genre Travel
- Website: http://gothiccruise.com/

Gothic Cruise is a small, annual electronic gothic-styled music festival that host oversea events relative to the goth culture. It has been operated continuously from a variety of ports within the United States of America with live entertainment venues since 2007. It was founded in 1989 by license advisor Zaida Browne, as she was largely to partly active in the early to mid 1980's, which was when the expansion of the style began to rise in countries, mostly the United Kingdom. The group began to widely expand during the early 2000's, but began to dissipate in passengers in between 2004 until it resumed its festivals in 2007. Like many cruises at the time, the yearly tradition was broken in 2020 due to the COVID-19 pandemic. Sailing resumed for 2021 and 2022, however the company opted for a land-based party in 2023 before resuming cruises in 2024.

== History ==
=== 1989–2003 ===
In 1989 the first event sailed with 10 people and the company claims to have had and average 140 people per sailing by 2003.

They sailed on Premier Cruise Line, Regal Cruise Lines and Royal Caribbean International.

There were no live bands during this time.

=== 2004–2006 ===
2004–2005 there were no sailings.

2006 – Collide was scheduled to play as the first live band on the cruise, but that sailing was cancelled due to Hurricane Katrina.

=== 2007 ===
Vessel: Carnival Glory on Carnival Cruise Lines.

Passengers: 211

Port: Port Canaveral, Florida.

Live Act:

- VNV Nation

=== 2008 ===
Vessel: Carnival Glory on Carnival Cruise Line

Passengers: 174

Port: Port Canaveral, Florida.

Live Acts:

- Combichrist
- Asmodeus X
- Phase Theory
- Red Flag

=== 2009 ===
Vessel: Carnival Legend on Carnival Cruise Line

Passengers: 149

Port: Tampa, Florida

Live Acts:

- The Crüxshadows
- Cruciform Injection
- State of the Union
- Modulate

=== 2010 ===
Vessel: Carnival Liberty on Carnival Cruise Line

Passengers: 237

Port: Miami, Florida

Live Acts:

- Covenant
- Funker Vogt
- The Crüxshadows
- Panzer AG
- DuPont
- Prognosis

=== 2011 ===
Vessel: Norwegian Sun on Norwegian Cruise Line

Passengers: 112

Port: Port Canaveral, Florida.

Live Acts:

- God Module
- Imperative Reaction
- System Synn

=== 2012 ===
Vessel: Explorer of the Seas on Royal Caribbean International

Passengers: 291

Port: Newark, New Jersey

Live Acts:

- VNV Nation
- Icon of Coil
- Aesthetic Perfection
- SITD

=== 2013 ===
Vessel: Freedom of the Seas on Royal Caribbean International

Passengers: 142

Port: Port Canaveral, Florida.

Live Acts:

- Ayria
- Bella Morte
- 00tz 00tz
- Sonik Foundry

=== 2014 ===
Vessel: Carnival Breeze on Carnival Cruise Line

Passengers: 265

Port: Miami, Florida

Live Acts:

- VNV Nation
- VNV Classic
- The Crüxshadows
- Ego Likeness
- Ayria
- Bella Morte
- Rain Within

=== 2015 ===
Vessel: Carnival Dream on Carnival Cruise Line

Passengers: 147

Port: New Orleans, Louisiana

Live Acts:

- Angels & Agony
- Ego Likeness
- Velvet Acid Christ
- Stoneburner

=== 2016 ===
Vessel: Carnival Legend on Carnival Cruise Lines

Passengers: 68

Port: Seattle, Washington

Live Acts:

- The Gothsicles
- Stoneburner
- Voltaire

=== 2017 ===
Vessel: Carnival Legend on Carnival Cruise Line

Disclaimer: From this point forward, the Gothic Cruise website doesn't include a passenger count.

Port: Long Beach, California

Live Acts:

- Covenant
- Haujobb
- Lights of Euphoria
- Hopeful Machines

=== 2018 ===
Vessel: Carnival Glory on Carnival Cruise Line

Passengers: 184

Port: Miami, Florida

Live Acts:

- The Birthday Massacre
- Diary of Dreams
- iVardensphere
- The Rain Within.

=== 2019 ===
Vessel: Carnival Conquest on Carnival Cruise Line

Port: Miami, Florida

Live Acts:

- Das Ich
- Grendel
- Ego Likeness
- FGFC820
- The Rain Within

=== 2020 ===
Cancelled due to the COVID-19 pandemic.

=== 2021 ===
Vessel: MSC Divina on MSC Cruises

Port: Port Canaveral, Florida

Live Acts:

- Die Sektor
- Rain within

=== 2022 ===
Vessel: MSC Divina on MSC Cruises

Port: Port Canaveral, Florida

Live Acts:

- Ego Likeness
- Stoneburner
- Gothsicles

=== 2023 ===
The 2023 event wasn't a cruise, but rather the company's first land-based meetup.

Location: New Orleans, Louisiana

Live Acts:

- IVardensphere
- DSTR
- Curse Mackey

=== 2024 ===
Vessel: Norwegian Escape on Norwegian Cruise Line

Port: Port Canaveral, Florida

Live Acts:

- Rotersand
- Combichrist
- Die Sektor

=== 2025 ===
Info TBD

=== 2026 ===
Info TBD
