= Kelly Maxwell =

Kelly Maxwell may refer to:

- Kelly Maxwell (softball), American softball player
- Kelly Maxwell, guitarist in band, Little Red Wolf
- Kelly Maxwell, character in Ash vs Evil Dead
