= Sea of Sin =

German synth-pop duo

- Origin: Hamburg, Germany
- Genres: Synth-pop, new wave, indie pop
- Years active: 1994–early 2000s; 2018–present
- Members: Frank Zwicker; Klaus Schill
- Website: seaofsin-official.com

Sea of Sin are a German synth-pop duo consisting of vocalist and lyricist Frank Zwicker and musician and producer Klaus Schill. The duo originated in the early 1990s, as the band Covent Garden and adopted the name Sea of Sin in 1994. They released their debut album, Watch Out!, that year, followed by the Illuminate EP in 1997. After a period of inactivity in the early 2000s, the duo returned in 2018 with the album Future Pulse.

== History ==
=== Formation and early releases ===
Frank Zwicker and Klaus Schill met while attending the same secondary school and began making music together in the early 1990s. Their first band was called Covent Garden and also included a school friend named Dirk. After discovering that another band was already using the name, they changed the group's name to Sea of Sin in 1994. The name was taken from the title of a B-side by English electronic band Depeche Mode.

The duo's debut album, Watch Out!, was released in 1994. In 1997, they released the Illuminate EP, which was produced by Heiko Maile of the German synth-pop band Camouflage.

In 2000, Sea of Sin released Urban Chemistry, a compilation of material from the group's 1990s releases. The collection included tracks from the Illuminate EP as well as other songs from the band's early period.

The group subsequently stopped releasing music together. In a 2020 interview, the members described the break as lasting almost 18 years. They said that they had pursued other professional activities during this period.

=== Reunion and later releases ===
Sea of Sin returned in 2018 with Future Pulse, an album featuring newly recorded versions of songs from their earlier catalogue. The release brought the duo back to the German synth-pop scene after their extended break. In 2019, they released Unbroken, their first album of new material since the reunion. The album reached number two on the Deutsche Alternative Charts (DAC), according to the band's 2020 interview.

On 29 November 2019, the duo released The Remixes, a compilation of remixes of their music. It featured contributions from electronic music acts including Mesh, Blume and The New Division.

In 2020, Sea of Sin released several singles, including "Unspoken Words", "Floating Away", "Turn Back Time" and "Immaculate". The remixes of these songs were collected on The Remixes II, released on 19 March 2021. The compilation reached number one on the Deutsche Alternative Charts, according to the band's official biography.

In 2021, the duo produced a remix of "Sometimes" by British singer Anne Clark. The remix appeared on her album Synaesthesia – Classics Re-Worked.

The album Tired of Chasing Ghosts was released in 2023. It brought together material released by the group in the preceding years, including singles, remixes and the previously unreleased song "Empty Places".

In 2025, Sea of Sin began releasing a series of singles, including "Faith!", "No Excuse", "Bang Bang Bang" and "Save Me". These were followed by "Renegades" and "Dark Revelations" in 2026. The songs appeared on the duo's album The Shape of a Lonely Soul, released on 13 March 2026.

== Musical style and influences ==
Sea of Sin's music combines elements of synth-pop, new wave and indie pop. The duo have cited Depeche Mode, Orchestral Manoeuvres in the Dark, New Order, The Cure, Alphaville and Talk Talk among their musical influences. Their songs combine electronic instrumentation and synthesizers with guitar-based arrangements and melodic vocals.

== Members ==
- Frank Zwicker – vocals, lyrics
- Klaus Schill – synthesizers, guitars, production

== Discography ==
=== Studio albums ===
- Watch Out! (1994)
- Future Pulse (2018)
- Unbroken (2019)
- Tired of Chasing Ghosts (2023)
- The Shape of a Lonely Soul (2026)

=== Extended Plays (EPs) ===
- Illuminate (1997)

=== Compilation albums ===
- Urban Chemistry (2000)
- The Remixes (2019)
- The Remixes II (2021)
