= Boole (band) =

US musical group

- Origin: Baltimore, Maryland
- Genres: Electro-industrial, futurepop, synthpop, trance
- Years active: 1996–present
- Labels: Dancing Bull, Sonic Mainline
- Members: Brad Barkett (songwriting, vocals, sax); Mike Barkett (vocals, sax)
- Past members: Ian Andrew Hall (vocals, melodica); J.J. Barkett (vocals, guitars); Kevin Zygmontas (lyrics, vocals)

Boole is an electronic hybrid act formed in 1996 by Brad Barkett and Mike Barkett at Loyola College in Baltimore, Maryland. The band was formed as a foray into explorations of post-modern forms of popular dance music, in contrast to Brad Barkett's experimental music project formed in 1990, The Apologizers. The current live lineup consists of Brad Barkett and Mike Barkett on vocals and saxophones.

== Biography ==
In 1996, Boole was formed by Brad Barkett (br0d) and Mike Barkett (The MAB) in Baltimore, Maryland, at Loyola College. After appearing on a few compilations and playing a few shows in the local area, Boole relocated to scenic Washington, DC.

== Discography ==
=== Albums ===
- The Wooper Du E.P. (Dancing Bull Productions, 1999)
- Self-Titled (Dancing Bull Productions, 2000)
- Pheromones (Dancing Bull Productions, 2002)
- The Vital Few (Dancing Bull Productions/Sonic Mainline Records, February 14, 2008)

=== Remixes ===
- "The Mask" (Infekktion (U.S.), 2003)
- "80's Boy" (Epsilon Minus (Alfa Matrix), 2003)
- "Document" (Assemblage 23 (Metropolis Records), 2003)
- "Disease" (Ayria (Alfa Matrix), 2003)
- "Burn Witch Burn"/"Severine" (Ego Likeness (Dancing Ferret Discs), 2006)
- "Nine Dudes Freaking Out" (The Gothsicles, 2009)
- "Hostage"/"Mindphaser (Front Line Assembly, 2010)
- "Awakening" (Talamasca (Mind Control Records), 2011)
- "Zwara" (Juno Reactor, 2011)
- "Voran" (Accessory (band), 2011)
- "My Guy Died" (The Gothsicles, 2011)
- "Daily War" (The Dark Clan, 2011)
- "White Knuckle Head Fuck" (Caustic (band), 2011)
- "Get The Party Started" (Pink (singer), 2014)
- "Unicorn" (Basement Jaxx, 2014)
- "Thriller" (Michael Jackson, 2014)
- "Party Killaz" (Godlips, 2014)

=== Covers ===
- "Pocket Calculator" (Kraftwerk, 1996)
- "Rough Sex" (Lords of Acid, 1997)
- "Move Any Mountain" (The Shamen, 1999)
- "Streetbeater" (Quincy Jones, 1999)
- "Mr. Roboto" (Styx, 2000)
- "Panic (song)" (The Smiths, 2000)
- "Leipzig" (Thomas Dolby, 2000)
- "Free Bird" (Lynyrd Skynyrd, 2001)
- "(Every Day Is) Halloween" (Ministry, 2002)
- "Sub-culture (song)" (New Order, 2003)

=== Compilations ===
- Greet The Sun, Subcon.01 (Magnetic Resonance, 1998)
- Subversitech, Sonic Seducer Cold Hands Seduction Vol. XIV (Sonic Seducer, 2001)
- Pheromones, Emotional Overdrive (Angelfall Studio Compilation Vol. 1, 2002)
- Outcasts, State of Synthpop 2005 (A Different Drum, 2005)
- Smoking Gun, Electronic Saviors: Industrial Music To Cure Cancer (Metropolis Records, 2010)
- Voran (Remix), Electronic Saviors Volume 2: Recurrence (Metropolis Records, 2012)

== Side projects ==
- The Apologizers, formed in 1990 by Brad Barkett, featuring many guest artists
- The Emptyset, formed in 2000 by Brad Barkett, with Jason "Hated" Taylor of Control.org, Mindstalker, and C2
- Mow Down Brown, formed in 2001 by Mike Barkett, with Chris Collins of Fort Chode
- Noonerschaft, formed in 2003 by Brad Barkett, with Ned Kirby of Stromkern and Bogart Shwadchuck of Epsilon Minus
- Pummeler, formed in 2007 by Brad Barkett, with J.J. Barkett of P.N.D., Spill, and Damn That's a Big Beetle I Wonder If It's Poisonous
