= The Thought Criminals =

The Thought Criminals or Thought Criminals may refer to:

- The Thought Criminals (Australian band)
- The Thought Criminals (British band)

== See also ==
- Thoughtcrime, a concept in the novel Nineteen Eighty-Four
- "Thought Criminal", a song by The Used from their album The Ocean of the Sky
