= Corporation (nightclub) =

Live music venue in Sheffield, England

Coordinates: 53.3770°N 1.4769°W

- Corp
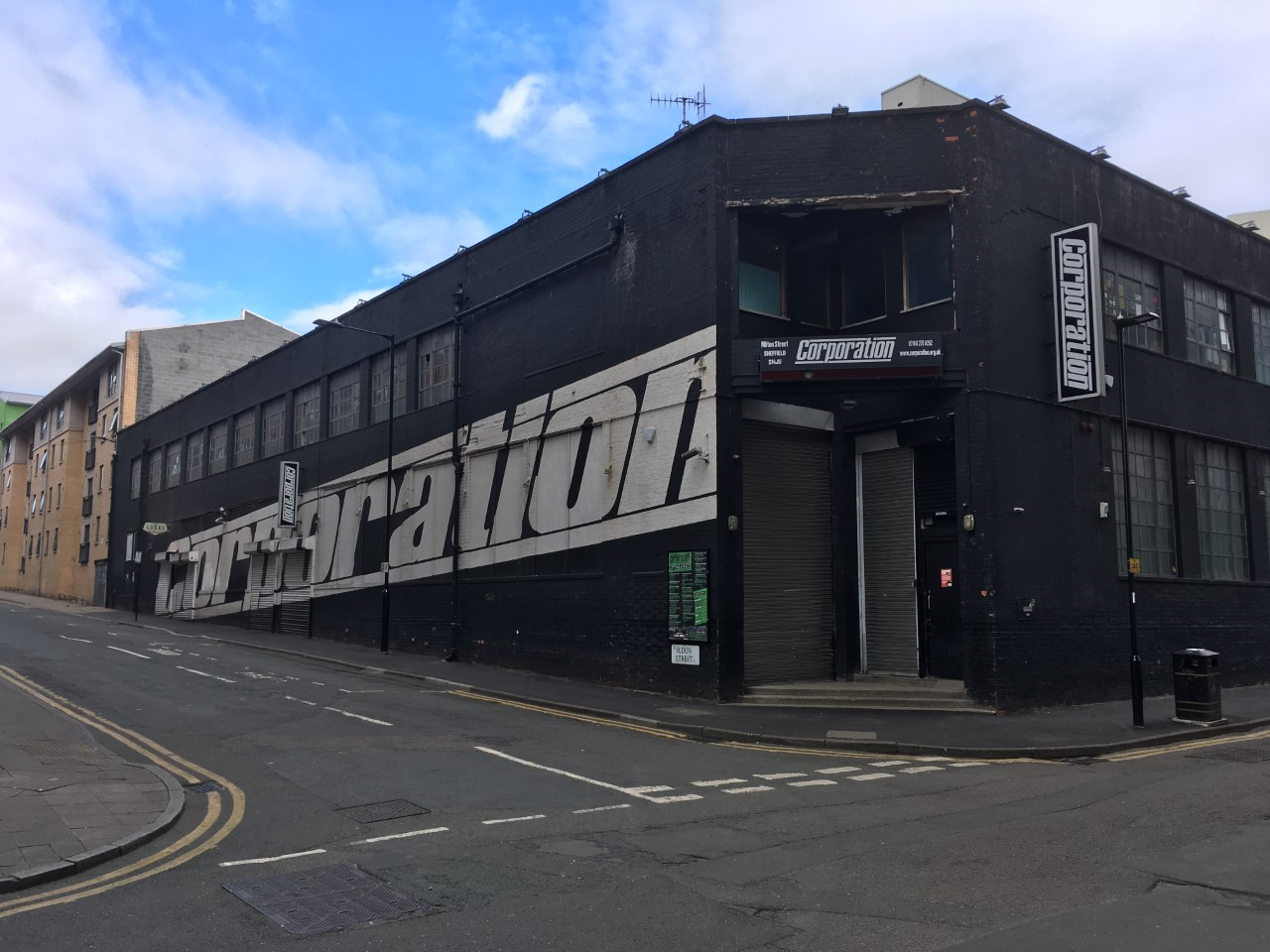
- Corporation in 2017
- Interactive map of Corporation
- Location: Sheffield
- Type: nightclub
- Event: alternative
- Public transit: B Y West Street

Construction
- Opened: 1997

Website
- www.corporation.org.uk

Corporation, often referred to as Corp by locals, is an independent live music venue and nightclub located in the city centre of Sheffield, England. In addition to hosting live music from touring bands, Corporation hosts club nights which play a variety of alternative, pop and rock music.

== Overview ==
=== Layout ===
Corporation is located in the Devonshire Quarter of Sheffield City Centre. Located on three floors, the club contains six bars throughout four rooms: the main arena/band room (Capacity of 453 people), small arena/band room (Capacity of 150 people), upstairs, and The Local Authority/L.A./White Room (Capacity of 270 people). The upstairs room is opened only during club nights and has a balcony overlooking the lower room's dance floor. The Local Authority was established as an additional room in 2013 and is opened on club nights as an extension to the main club and serves on non-club nights as a "mini club".

The total capacity of the venue is 1343 people and this is calculated by adding together the capacity of the individual rooms, as outlined on the Venues Premise Licence

Ground floor - Unit 1 (Small band room) - 150

Ground - Unit 1 raised area (Small band rooms stage) - 50

Ground Floor - Unit 2 (Small Jack Daniels room) - 160

First Floor - Unit 3 (Old/Original room up-stairs) - 320

Mezzanine - Unit 4 (Balcony/VIP area) - 100

New extension/dance room (Main room down-stairs) - 293

First Floor - New Room 5 (LA/Local Authority/White room) - 270

=== Club nights ===
Weekly club nights are held on Mondays (Monday Corp), Fridays (Drop) and Saturdays (Dirty Deeds).

=== Live acts ===
Many bands and artists, such as Bring Me the Horizon, Lamb of God, Slash (musician), Soulfly and Alestorm have played at Corporation. The Resistanz Festival, an annual festival of industrial, synthetic and electronic music was held over Easter weekend at Corporation until 2016. Live shows are all standing-only events viewed in either the main arena or small arenas.

=== Awards and recognition ===
Corporation was voted the best nightclub in Sheffield by the readers of The Star, beating The Leadmill by 800 votes.

The regular club nights hosted at Corporation (Monday Corp, Skint, Drop and Dirty Deeds) are frequently placed among the best in Sheffield and Northern England in general. All of Corporation's weekly club nights attract thousands of people every week, including students from both of Sheffield’s Universities.

Corporation is also noted for the blue pint, its signature drink. There are also red, orange, yellow, green, pink and purple variants.

== History ==
Corporation was originally based on Bank Street, near Castle Market, in a building that had been occupied by a succession of different nightclubs. The building itself was opened in 1967 as The Cavendish Club, was renamed in 1970 to Bailey's Nightclub, again in 1978 to Romeo and Juliet's Nightclub and once more to Cairo Jax in 1985. Cairo Jax closed in 1997, after which Corporation began operations there. In addition to the two separate dance-floors, connected by a main entrance corridor and also one further back, there was a Skate Ramp area and a selection of video games, with alcoves to relax in.

In 2002, Corporation moved to its current location on Milton Street.

In November 2026, former (Left 2024) resident DJ Matthew Blakey was jailed for child sexual offences.
