= Resistanz =

British industrial music festival

Resistanz Festival
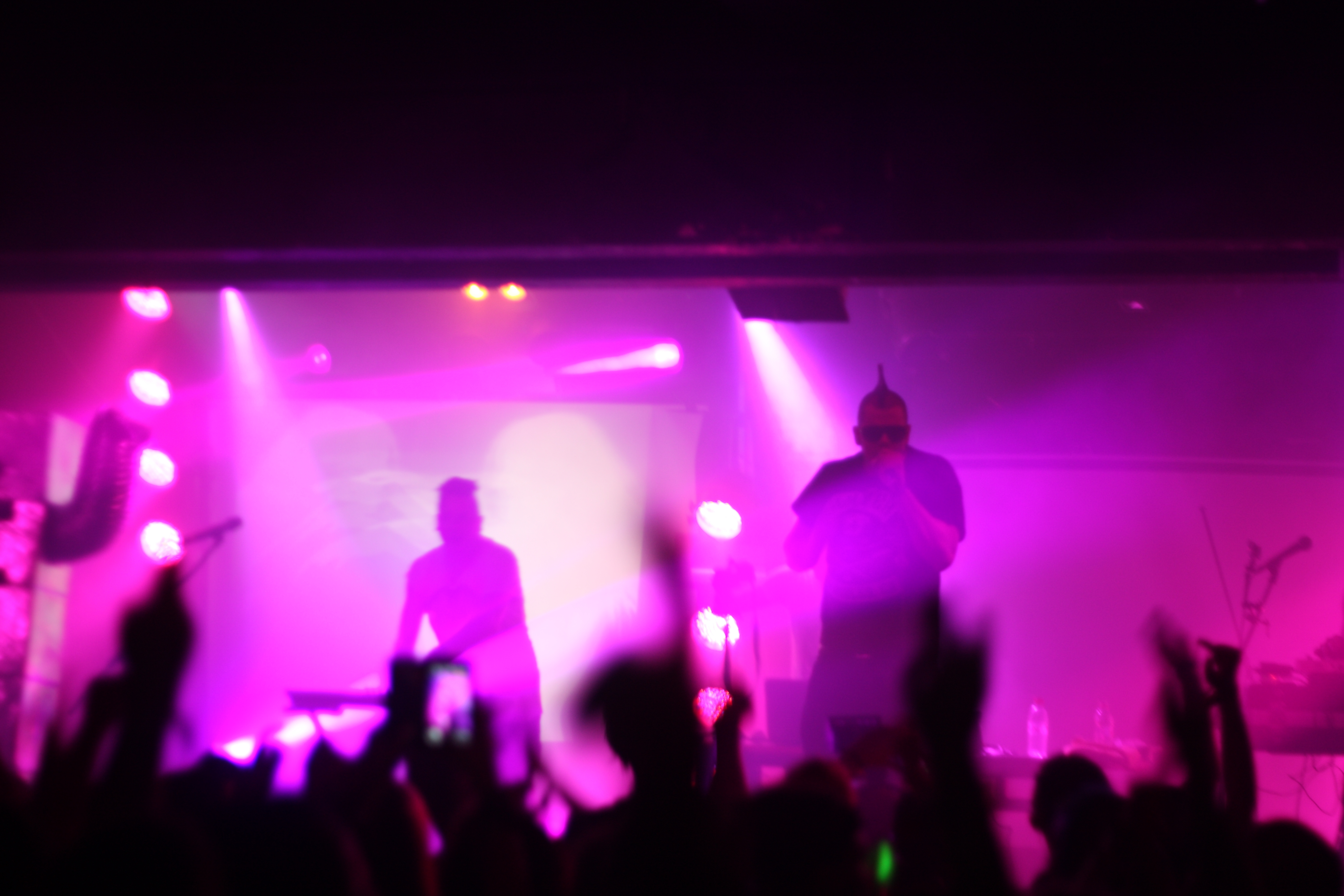
- Picture from 2014
- Genre: Industrial music
- Locations: Sheffield, England
- Years active: 2022 onwards(relaunch of festival); 2011-2016
- Website: https://www.facebook.com/resistanzfestival

Brainchild of Sheffield promoter Leighton, Resistanz is an industrial music festival running since 2011 over the Easter weekend, at the Corporation venue in Sheffield, England. Held annually until 2016, the event was due to take place in 2020 but has been rescheduled for 2022 due to Coronavirus. The festival primarily features alternative electronic music acts including industrial, EBM, futurepop, synthpop and power noise. In later years the festival expanded to include a smaller second room featuring an eclectic mix of artists from genres such as Chiptune, EDM and Drum and bass.

== Event Line-Ups ==
| Year | Dates | Location | Notes |
|---|---|---|---|
| 2025 | 18 April to 20 April | Sheffield | Priest, Aesthetic Perfection, Ashbury Heights, ALT BLK ERA, Years of Denial, Harpy, Cyferdyne, TorontoIsBroken + Reebz, Beyond Border, Leæther Strip, Everything Goes Cold, Palindrones, Dark Machine Nation, Nox Pulso, Junkie Kut, Gencab, Neuroklast, Ray Noir, Jamie Headcharge vs Ms Devine vs Bloodyjoy, Chump Wrecker, VideoKids played at the festival; with DJ sets from Ultravixen, Electric Drean Ted, Nemeshade, E.V., Ray the Binman, Er4se, Simon Penguin, Arricc, Charlieoctogirl, Nerocipher, Vicious Moon x Noizerker, Mechanical Vein x Biomechanimal, ADBT, Crispygoth. |
| 2024 | 29 March to 31 March | Sheffield | Altern 8, ZARDONIC, Frozen Plasma with MATT HART, then grabyourface, then also Seraphim System stage invasions, KANGA, ES23, Choke Chain, Danny Blu, For All the Emptiness feat. MATT HART and also guest Marianne Benedicte J Sveinsson, Killing Miranda, Simon Carter & Fabsi, Seraphim System with guests MATT HART and Keith Kamholz (Mechanical Vein), grabyourface, Teknovore feat. MATT HART with additional guests Matthew Simpson (Biomechanimal), John Stancil (Seraphim System) and Marie L Dragontown (grabyourface) and Karkasaurus performed at the festival. |
| 2023 | 7 April to 10 April | Sheffield | Assemblage 23, Ayria, Grendel, Moris Blak, Randolph & Mortimer, Wulfband, Seraphim System, Biomechanimal, Blackbook, Pretty Addicted, HarleyLikesMusic, Blink 242, Mechanical Vein, Helix, A-E, W.A.S.T.E, Radio Strain, Antibody, Dark Machine Nation, Vuxnut and Master Boot Record performed at the festival. |
| 2022 | 15 April to 17 April | Sheffield | MATT HART, Straftanz, Rotersand, Empirion, Promenade Cinema, Empathy Test, Horskh, Memmaker, iVardenshpere, Stoppenberg, Vanguard, The Gothsicles, Sirus, ESA, Cyferdyne, J:Dead, Wychdoktor, Craven, Antibody and Machine Wraith performed at the festival. |
| 2020 - Postponed due to Coronavirus | 10 April to 13 April | Sheffield | The bands scheduled for this coming year’s festival were Straftanz, Assemblage 23, The Gothsicles and Stoppenberg. ES23, Surgyn, Sirus, Promenade Cinema, Wychdoktor, SPARK! and REIN were also scheduled to play. |
| 2016 | 25 March to 28 March | Sheffield | Godflesh, Organ Donors, Neuroticfish, Izoloscope, Petrol Bastard, IVardensphere, Grendel, Basszilla, Cyferdyne, Terrolokaust and The Gothsicles performed at the festival. |
| 2015 | 3 April to 6 April | Sheffield | 3Teeth, Hocico, Solitary Experiments, Author & Punisher, Reaper, Pre/Verse, Waste, Ruinizer, Rave the Requiem, Da Octopusss, Sirus, Advance and Coma Duster performed at the festival. |
| 2014 | 18 April to 21 April | Sheffield | Incubite, WormZ, Chrom, Modulate, Straftanz (Final ever show), Izoloscope, The.Invalid, Nitro/Noise, Memmaker, Organ Donors, Cyberpunkers, Assemblage 23, Freakangel, Cyferdyne, Die Sektor, Cuttoff: Sky, This Morn Omina, Beelzebass, Seabound and Apoptygma Berzerk performed at the festival. |
| 2013 | 29 March to 1 April | Sheffield | Funker Vogt, Aesthetic Perfection, Alien Vampires, C-Lekktor, Surgyn, CygnosiC, Uberbyte, IVardensphere, Seabound, BlackOPz, Method Cell, Celldweller, Noisuf-X, Chain Reactor, Cease2xist, Voster, Alter Der Ruine, and Phosgore performed at the festival. |
| 2012 | 7 April to 9 April | Sheffield | Icon of Coil, Grendel, Mind.in.a.box, Nachtmahr, Ultraviolence, Frozen Plasma, Soman, Straftanz, ESA, Waste, Be My Enemy, Memmaker, FGFC820, Detroit Diesel and Surgyn performed at the festival. |
| 2011 | 2 April to 3 April | Sheffield | Suicide Commando, Faderhead, Modulate, XP8, Uberbyte, C/A/T, Gothsicles, And One, Covenant, Caustic, SAM, Eisenfunk, Deviant UK and [X-RX] performed at the festival. |

== See also ==
- List of industrial music festivals
- List of electronic music festivals
