= Pr0metheus Burning =

Prometheus Burning
- Origin: Pittsburgh, Pennsylvania
- Genre: Electro-industrial
- Years active: 2001–2014
- Labels: Augmented, Hive Records, Crunch Pod, Thac0 Records, WTII Records
- Members: Greg VanEck, Nikki Telladictorian
- Website: www.prometheus-burning.com

Pr0metheus Burning (also commonly spelled Prometheus Burning) was an Electro-Industrial duo from Pittsburgh, Pennsylvania, which started in early 2001. The group has garnered notable success with the release of their 2006 album Beyond Repair, and its 2007 remix album Nboyde Rarepi (which included remixes from Xanopticon, Iszoloscope, and others), both released through Hive Records, and most recently, their 2012 release Kill it with Fire, which was released on Wax Trax II records. Together the group has released a total of four full-length albums, one remix album, has been featured in several compilation albums, and has created remixes for other Electro-Industrial artists.

In addition to playing much of the East coast and Midwest, the group has also performed in Canada.

The current members in the studio are Nikki Telladictorian and Greg VanEck, but have featured special guests and theatrics on stage during live performances.

== History ==
Pr0metheus Burning began in 2001 as an experimental electronic project by Greg VanEck. In 2003, he self-released the experimental Cathode demo, and some time after Nikki Telladictorian joined and performed vocals on some material featured on the 2004 debut album Influenza, released in a limited edition of 50 copies on the record label Between Existence. The album was re-released in early 2005 by Augmented Records with added bonus tracks with different artwork and packaging.

In May 2006 they signed to Hive Records and released their next album, Beyond Repair, which received a positive review in Igloo Magazine. It was around this time that they stopped using the pr0metheus buRning moniker and became known as Prometheus Burning as seen on the album covers for Beyond Repair.

A remix version of Beyond Repair, entitled Nboyde Rarepi, was released the following year. It included remixes by artists including Iszoloscope, Xanopticon, Edgey, and Atomhead, and a previously unreleased song titled "Battery Drain".

In 2008 they released a 12-inch record on Thac0 Records in collaboration with fiction writer Kenji Siratori. The album cover featured artwork by visual artist Paul McCarroll. Also in 2008 they signed to Crunch Pod Records and released Plague Called Humanity in 2009. In March 2009 they embarked on the Vampirefreaks.com It Ain't Dead Yet Tour with Caustic and The Gothsicles. They toured 12 cities in a period of 2 weeks which spanned across the Midwest and East Coast.

In February 2010, posts by Prometheus Burning on the band's LiveJournal and MySpace confirmed the existence and track listing of their next studio album, titled Displacement Disorder. During April of that same year Prometheus Burning confirmed that the album would be self-released, and began a Kickstarter project to build donations for the album. The project included auctioning of studio artwork created by Nikki Telladictorian, as well as live Stickam feeds from within the Prometheus Burning studio. These scheduled live performances were called "Noise-A-Thon" webcasts, and included performances by Four Pi Movement, Xanopticon, DJ Cutups, and Herpes Hideaway. The group exceeded their Kickstarter goal by the end of the month. Displacement Disorder was released as a double CD package that included bonus items such as stickers, pins, and limited edition postcards hand crafted by Nikki Telladictorian, each one featuring one of a kind artwork collages.

In 2012 the band signed with Wax Trax II Records, also known as WTII, to release their next full-length album Kill it with Fire. This album was the third release to feature custom artwork by visual artist Paul McCarroll, creating an ongoing aesthetic theme with the band's album art. Also in 2012 the band started an IndieGoGo campaign to raise money for releasing a Lung Cancer awareness compilation. They exceeded their goal of $1,000 by an additional $380. The compilation was titled Pneuma and was released as a digital download and a double disk CD, both available through Bandcamp exclusively. The compilation featured experimental electronic artists such as Android Lust, Somatic Responses, and Nordvargr. All proceeds generated from sales of Pneuma are to be annually donated to a non-profit charity dedicated to cancer research. The first of these donations were made on August 30, 2013, for a total of $1,319.

== Discography ==
=== Demos ===
- Lamer (2001)
- Cathode (2003)
- Influenza (2004)

=== Studio albums ===
- Influenza (2005, Augmented)
- Beyond Repair (2006, Hive)
- Nboyde Rarepi (2007, Hive)
- Plague Called Humanity (2009, Crunch Pod)
- Displacement Disorder (2010, Augmented)
- Kill It With Fire (2012, WTII)

=== EPs ===
- Retribution (2008, Thac0)
