= Live Your Life (album) =

Studio album by Versailles
- Released: February 2003
- Recorded: February 2001 – February 2003
- Genre: Darkwave
- Label: Evileye

Versailles chronology
Fallen Angel (2002)	Live Your Life (2003)

Professional ratings
Review scores
Source	Rating
Stream of Consciousness	(favorable)

Live Your Life is an album by the darkwave artist Versailles.

Live Your Life, released in 2003 on Versailles' own record label Evileye Records, is her first full-length album. The follow-up to her 2002 demo Fallen Angel, Live Your Life continued to develop her unique sound and creativity.

Recorded over a period of two years with help from producer Mike White, Versailles explores her darkest areas and brings out her need for self healing and the healing of others. After moving from New Mexico to Los Angeles, Versailles took on a year of study at the Musicians Institute and isolation to finish the album. This album brings out her need to express her inner pain, longing and need to belong to something greater than herself.

== Track listing ==
1. "Cemetery Man" - 5:38
2. "Fire Ring" - 4:52
3. "Whispering Willow Tree" – 2:21
4. "Shadow Behind Me" – 4:05
5. "Crystals Last Glance" – 5:07
6. "Live Your Life" – 5:02
7. "Fallen Angel" – 5:01
8. "Little Dead Kitten" – 4:50
9. "Night" – 5:37
10. "These Eyes" – 4:45

== Personnel ==
- Dianna St. Hilaire – Synthesizer, guitar, programming, vocals, cover art
- Schannon Shirey - Photography
- Mike White - Production, electric guitar, bass
- Stien - Effects
