= Straftanz =

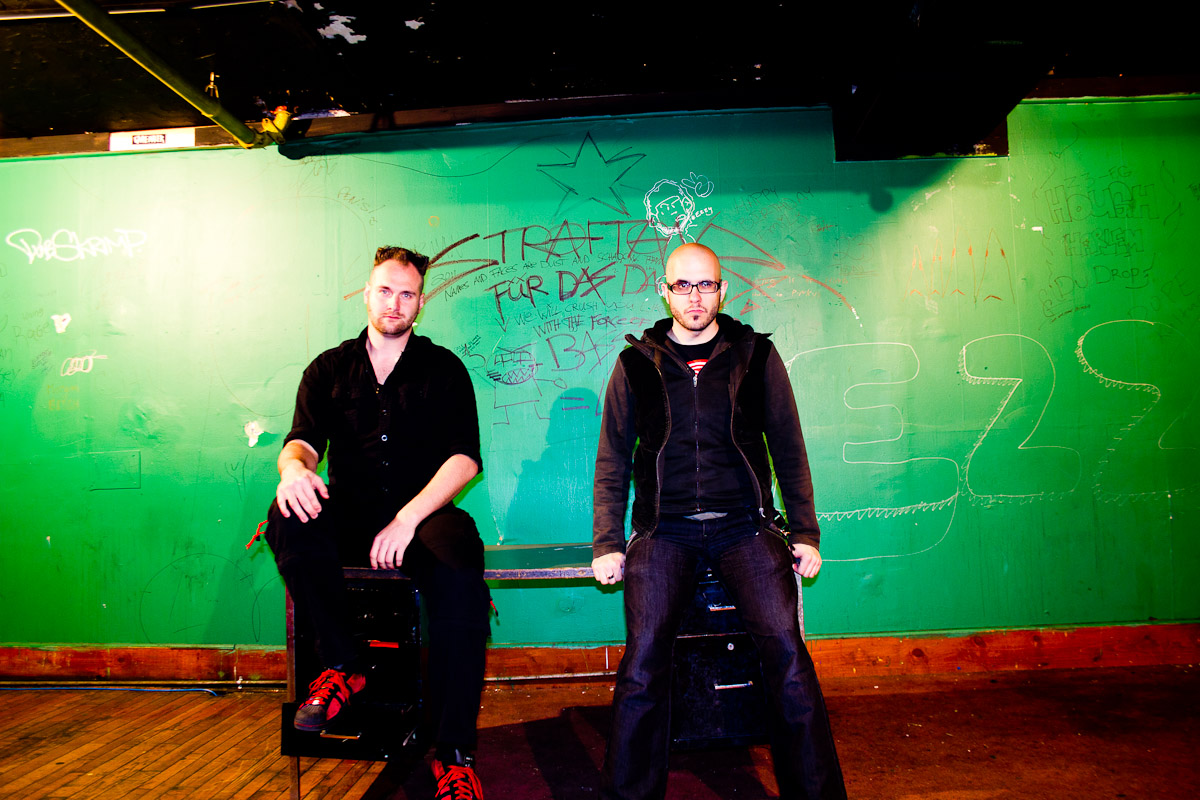

Background information
- Origin: Gelsenkirchen, Germany
- Genres: EBM; Aggrotech; Futurepop
- Years active: 2006–2014
- Labels: Scanner, dependent, Metropolis
- Members: j-ing, k-x, -jl-, cyberdominator
- Website: http://straftanz.de

Straftanz was a German electronic dance music project, established in the summer of 2006. Straftanz consisted of a loose group of artists (j-ing, k-x, -jl- and cyberdominator) who called themselves the Straftanz ZK. Additional artists involved were Carsten Jacek (SITD), Mille Petrozza, and Myk Jung (The Fair Sex) who were involved in the recording of the first album Forward Ever. Straftanz also collaborated with the futurepop project Rotersand by way of sharing ideas and equipment. In interviews, Straftanz described its musical style as "Industrial-Streetfighting-Dance". In fact, the sound of Straftanz is best described as a mixture of EBM, futurepop, trance, rave, metal, and rhythm noise elements that are tied together with a present dance groove.

== History ==
The track "Straftanz" was first played at the club Sixx P.M. in Dortmund. DJs copied the demo and spread it across Germany and Europe before any record deal was offered. The German label Dependent signed Straftanz and in October 2006 released the single "Straftanz" with surprising success, ranking #35 on the Deutsche Alternative Charts (DAC) Top 100 Singles of 2006. Despite the fact that its lyrics mainly consisted of the names of German alternative clubs and DJs, "Straftanz" in its various versions covering different areas of Germany (Ost, Süd, West and Nord) gained attention at alternative parties worldwide. The UK act Revolution By Night completed a remix of the track entitled "Straftanz UK (featuring RBN)" for the band, but currently this version has not been made available commercially. However, it was available on the Straftanz Myspace page, picked up club play in the UK, and was played live several times by RBN.

After the record label Dependent went out of business, Straftanz changed to the label Scanner and released the EP "Tanz Kaputt, was Euch Kaputt Macht!" which was followed by the project's first album release Forward Ever. German music magazines covered Straftanz extensively. "Tanz Kaputt, was Euch Kaputt Macht!" reached Position 23 in the 2008 Deutsche Alternative Jahrescharts. Straftanz played several club shows and festival gigs since the release of the album. In October 2009, Straftanz toured for the first time by joining VNV Nation on the second part of their Of Faith, Power, and Glory tour.

In September 2011 Straftanz released its second album Mainstream Sellout Overground in Europe, closely followed by its first US release on Metropolis. In time for the release Straftanz again joined VNV Nation for the European leg of their Automatic tour, covering 18 gigs in 8 countries. In November Straftanz toured the United States for the first time as support band for the Automatic tour.

In November 2013 Straftanz announced that their last performance would be at Resistanz on April 18, 2014. A post on Straftanz.org stated that "The artistic concept of Straftanz is exhausted. Therefore we quit." The group has since disbanded and some have moved onto new projects including electro-rock band Pre/verse.

== Discography ==
- Straftanz, MCD (2006) Dependent Records
- Tanz Kaputt, was Euch Kaputt Macht!, EP (2007_ Scanner/Dark Dimensions
- Forward Ever, CD (2007) Scanner/Dark Dimensions
- Mainstream Sellout Overground (2011) Metropolis
