= Bella Lune =

- Origin: Phoenix, Arizona, USA
- Genres: Gothic; Darkwave ethereal electronic dreampop
- Years active: 2007–present
- Label: Aetheria Music
- Members: Fuchsia; Hurley; Beeka; Lenore
- Past members: Kal3id; R. Duke; Dy; Teresa Joy; Divad; J.J.
- Website: www.bellalune.com

Bella Lune is a darkwave/dreampop band that was formed in 2007 in Phoenix, Arizona, USA. The band incorporates elements of darkwave, post-punk, synthpop, shoegaze, and ethereal music to create a dreamlike trance throughout their sound. Bella Lune cites many 80s post-punk and new wave bands as influences, including The Cure, Joy Division, Depeche Mode, Cocteau Twins, New Order, Siouxsie and the Banshees, Bauhaus, and Love and Rockets.

== History ==
=== Abstracted Visions (2007-2009) ===
Bella Lune originated when lead singer/songwriter Fuchsia Angel met former guitar player and songwriter Kal3id. After discovering they had similar tastes in music, Bella Lune took shape.

The band's first album, Abstracted Visions, was released in 2007 on the band's own record label, Aetheria Music. The album drew comparisons by critics to bands like The Cure, The Birthday Massacre, Cocteau Twins, and Switchblade Symphony. Abstracted Visions relies on delicate synth and guitar patterns to weave somber and ambient atmospheres. The band also released music videos for three songs--"Transmissions," "Neverwhere," and "Blissful Escape." Hurley was recruited in 2008 to play synths and help with production.

In 2009, the band was listed in Music to Die For: The International Guide to Today's Extreme Music Scene, written by Mick Mercer. Violinist, Beeka, made her live debut when Bella Lune opened for Nitzer Ebb, on their Industrial Complex tour.

=== Synesthesia (2010-2012) ===
Synesthesia, the group's second album, was released in 2010. In the same footsteps of their debut, Synesthesia drew further comparisons to bands well known within dark alternative circles. It also opened them up to a larger, international audience. Drummer, R. Duke, joined the live lineup in 2010. The band created music videos for "The Dolly Pop Song" and the fan favorite "Ophelia." Following the release of Synesthesia, Bella Lune embarked on a tour in Japan, with a headline performance in Tokyo. Prior to the tour, Dy was recruited to play guitar, completing the live ensemble.

In 2011, Bella Lune released an EP called Ophelia, featuring remixes by artists, including Daniel Myer. It also has a cover of Dead Souls by Joy Division. The band was featured in Issue 7 of Giuseppina Magazine and photographed by Brandy Caldwell. Fuchsia and Dy appeared on the cover of Echo Magazine's 2011 Halloween Issue. Fuchsia was featured in the Breast Cancer Awareness Issue of Giuseppina Magazine, where she was commended for donating her hair to the charity Locks of Love. Fuchsia also appeared in the special Halloween edition of Giuseppina Magazine, with a pictorial by photographer Brandy Caldwell.

In 2012, Bella Lune embarked on their first European Tour, which ended with a headline performance in Whitby, England at the Bram Stoker Film Festival. Heinz Ehlmann wrote about Bella Lune in Issue 74 of Gothic Magazine. The song "Ophelia" was included on the magazine's Gothic Compilation Part LIV. Lead singer, Fuchsia, was published in several fashion magazines in 2012, including Bella Morte Magazine, LA Hot Magazine, and Vedere Magazine.

=== Secrets and Tranzendance (2013-2016) ===
The third album Secrets, released in 2013, saw a shift in direction, toning down the electronics and bringing a more organic sound to the forefront. The last track on the album is a live mix of "Transmissions," featuring heavier guitars and percussion, as well as a violin outro. This is the last album to feature founding member Kal3id. In August 2013, Fuchsia was on the cover of the Phoenix New Times Magazine, titled "Rock of Ages". Fuchsia was also on the cover of Carpe Nocturne Magazine, and interviewed for the article "An Evening With Bella Lune".

Fuchsia and Hurley spent 2014 in the studio writing, recording and producing their fourth full-length album 'Tranzendance'. Bella Lune also contributed a song to the charity compilation DeathMass Six in 2014, to help feed hungry LGBT families.

On January 31, 2015, Bella Lune released their fourth studio album Tranzendance, which incorporated more danceable, modern electronic elements to their sound. Bella Lune joined forces with Mike Jenney, of Alter Der Ruine, who contributed percussion and additional production on the album. A portion of the proceeds from the album sales are being donated to musicandmemory.org, which helps elderly alzheimer's patients in nursing homes through music therapy. In June 2015, Bella Lune headlined a dark electronic showcase at the Crescent Ballroom in Phoenix. The band added a new visual element to their set for 2016, which was created by visual artist NyQ Bonaventura. In the fall of 2015, Bella Lune was included on Side Line Music Magazine's Face The Beat Vol. 2 compilation. They opened for Keep Shelley In Athens, from Greece, at Valley Bar in November 2015. Bella Lune was also included on the final 'DeathMass Six' charity compilation in December 2015.

In 2016, Fuchsia and Hurley began writing their fifth studio album. Fuchsia and Hurley also took to the dance floor in 2014, by contributing their DJ/mixing skills to events like Club Shadowplay, AZ Vampire Ball, Fetish Ball events, and Spellbound Burlesque. Bella Lune performed live at the Sinful Dreams fetish event in June 2016, and brought back long time drummer, R. Duke, to be a guest for two special shows. They also added a new keyboardist, Lenore, to the live line-up just on time for their show at Bar Sinister in Los Angeles on July 23. Lenore's Arizona debut with Bella Lune was at Club Red in Mesa, AZ on December 6, opening for Toronto synthpop act Ayria and London based Inertia.

=== Covers Vol. 1 and Stardust (2016-2019) ===
As Fuchsia and Hurley wrote their fifth studio album, they continued to DJ frequently. The group started a regular dance night in the Phoenix area called Club Nocturne in January 2017, which continues to grow in popularity. They also became the resident DJ at Spellbound Burlesque. On October 1, 2018, Bella Lune released an album of covers appropriately titled 'Covers Vol. 1', which includes covers originally done by Cocteau Twins, New Order, Siouxsie And The Banshees, Massive Attack, Led Zeppelin and others. By Summer of 2019, they had finished 'Stardust', which features more live band members than ever before. The album will be released in Summer 2019, and more live shows will be scheduled. To Be Continued...

== Touring ==
Bella Lune has also shared the stage with many popular acts in the goth industrial subculture, such as Peter Murphy, Icon Of Coil, Ayria, The Crüxshadows, I:Scintilla, Lycia, My Life with the Thrill Kill Kult, Nitzer Ebb, Voltaire, Covenant, OhGr, Left Spine Down, Dope Stars Inc, Stripmall Architecture, Bella Morte, Ego Likeness, Audra, and many more.

In Spring 2010, Bella Lune did a mini-tour in Japan, with a headline performance in Tokyo. In October 2012, Bella Lune embarked on their first European Tour, which ended with a headline performance in Whitby, England at the Bram Stoker Film Festival.

== Side Projects ==
Fuchsia also has a side project called Dreamgaze. Dreamgaze takes influence from shoegaze and dreampop music. The first album, Sound Colour, was released in 2009 on Aetheria music. Fuchsia also has a side project called Annadyne, which formed in 2002, took a decade long hiatus and reformed in 2016.

== Current band members ==
- Fuchsia Angel - Vocals, songwriting, guitar, bass, keyboards, synth/drum programming
- Hurley - Synth, bass, guitar, production, songwriting, vocals, synth/drum programming
- Beeka - Violin
- Lenore - Synth & voice programming

== Former band members ==
- Kal3id - Songwriting, guitar, synth, drums, production, vocals
- Dy - Guitar
- Teresa Joy - Violin
- Divad - Guitar
- JJ - Drums
- R. Duke - Drums

== Discography ==
=== Full Releases ===
- Abstracted Visions (2007)
- Synesthesia (2010)
- Secrets (2013)
- Tranzendance (2015)
- Covers Vol. 1 (2018)
- Stardust (2019)

=== Maxi-Singles ===
Ophelia (2011)

=== Side Projects ===
Dreamgaze - Sound Colour LP (2009) Annadyne - The Fallen One Single (2016) Annadyne - The Last Time Single (2017) Annadyne - Anymore Single (2018)

=== Compilations ===
- Lunar Sea (2009) (Shinto Records)
- E Ditoria (2009) (Shinto Records)
- Zoundbies (2009) (Zorch Records)
- Face the Beat Vol. 1 (2011) (Side-Line)
- DeathMass Six (2014)
- Face the Beat Vol. 2 (2015) (Side-Line Music Magazine)
- DeathMass Six (2015)

=== Music videos ===
- "Neverwhere" (2008) (Light Pulse Studios)
- "Transmissions" (2009) (Light Pulse Studios)
- "Blissful Escape" (2009) (Light Pulse Studios)
- "Ophelia" (2011) (Light Pulse Studios)
- "The Dolly Pop Song" (2011) (Light Pulse Studios)
- "Don't Wake Me Up"- Tranzendance (2016)
