= Blume (band) =

Italian electronic music band

- Origin: Italy
- Genres: Futurepop; Synthpop; Darkwave
- Years active: 2008–present
- Labels: WTII Records, A Different Drum
- Members: Enrico Filisetti; Ivan Savino; Daniele De Fabritiis

Blume are an Italian electronic music band formed in Milan in 2008. The group consists of Enrico Filisetti (vocals), Ivan Savino (synthesizers and programming), and Daniele De Fabritiis (guitars). Their sound blends EBM-futurepop with synthpop and darkwave.

== History ==
With the online release of the first recordings, they capture the curiosity of media and critics, arousing the interest of the following and of some labels. In February 2009, the band signed a record deal with the US label A Different Drum, which releases Rise From Grey, in January 2010. The debut album achieved success from the press with several specialty magazines praising the band for their work.

After the first European tour, the band signed new recording contract with the label WTII Records, which releases the single "Western Rust" in July 2013, and their second studio album Autumn Ruins, in September 2013. On October 20, 2017, the band released a new single, "Blackening", immediately acclaimed by fans and critics. On May 4, 2018, the third album called Ashes is being distributed globally.

Over the years, their music leads them to play in some of the most important clubs and festivals throughout Europe, like the Wave-Gotik-Treffen. The band shared the stage in Italy, Germany, England, Russia, Spain and Greece with some influential bands of the dark alternative scene, including: Covenant, Kirlian Camera, VNV Nation, She Wants Revenge, De/Vision, Seabound, Apoptygma Berzerk and many more.

== Band name ==
The band name comes from a German word that means Bloom, Flower. Their name was taken from the song "Blume" by German industrial band, Einstürzende Neubauten. The band chose this for the symbolic and allegorical meaning. In their lyrics is often present an apocalyptic scenery.

== Band members ==
- Enrico Filisetti (Vocals, Songwriting)
- Ivan Savino (Songwriting, Production, Keyboards)
- Daniele De Fabritiis (Guitars)

== Discography ==
=== Albums ===
- Rise From Grey (2010)
- Autumn Ruins (2013)
- Ashes (2018)

=== Singles and EPs ===
- "Western Rust" (2013)
- "Blackening" (2017)
