= The Thought Criminals (British band) =

English electronic band

- Origin: London, United Kingdom
- Genres: Electropop; Industrial; Electro
- Years active: 2004–present
- Label: WTII Records
- Members: Rocky Goode, Kirlian Blue,
- Website: thethoughtcriminals.co.uk

The Thought Criminals is a London, England-based electronic band, formed by Kirlian Blue (synths, backing vocals) and Rocky Goode (vocals, lyrics) in 2004. Their debut album was Die Young : Stay Pretty (2008, WTII Records), made with dance producer Tony Messenger and mixer Rob Henry of Children of The Bong. Their last release was the Alnum "You're A Moral Liability !" (19 November 2018, WTII Records). "The Thought Criminals conjure early 80's style electropop in the vein of, Frankie Goes to Hollywood, Soft Cell, New Order, Gary Numan, OMD, etc". "The band’s sound contains audible traces of Gary Numan, Tik and Tok, Nine Inch Nails and a gorgeously dark sense of humour which will leave a little smile on your face." "Take one part Numan-esque glamour, one part Soft Cell'ish sleaze and sultriness and one part Prodigy inspired punk rock and you'll still be nowhere close to describing the hyper-kinetik sound of London's self-proclaimed electro-sluts."

== Official releases ==
- You're A Moral Liability ! (WTII140) Album released by WTII Records 19 November 2018.
- "No Love Song" (WTII134) EP release by WTII Records 9 September 2017.
- "Dirty Electro EP" (WTII125) EP release by WTII Records 31 October 2016.
- "All the Freaks" (WTII055) Single released by WTII Records 3 August 2009.
- Die Young: Stay Pretty (WTII051) Album released by WTII Records Fall 2008.
- "Suicide Bomber" (CRIME002) Single released by Dirty Electro 10 September 2007.
- "I Wanna Be a Celebrity" (EFS-IS-027) Single released by Electric Fantastic Sound 1 March 2007.

== Compilation appearances ==
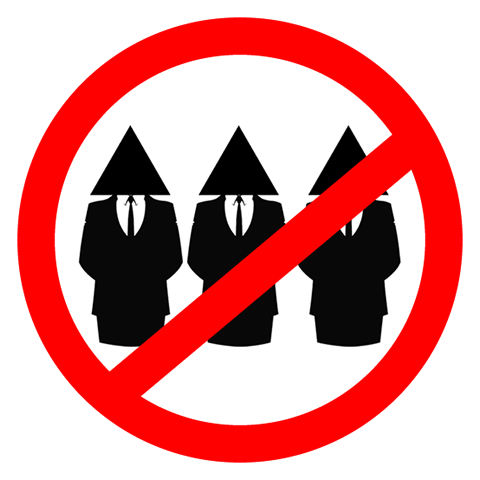
Logo

- Cyberslut - Jaded KMA Records 2005.
- Date Rape Lovers - 4x4 Multi-Single Vol 1 Section 44 Records 2005.
- Electricity - 4x4 Multi-Single Vol 1 Section 44 Records 2005.
- Party Till The Police Come Section 44 Records Electrixmas 2007.
- Electricity - Electrixmas 2007.Electrixmas 2007.
- Suicide Bomber - Synthklubben V2.7 Killing Music 2007.
- Pay Her To Lay Her - We Love Synthpop - The Album ScentAir Records 2012.
- Dirty Electro - Metazoa OTB Records 2016
- Watching You - WTII Records Label Sampler 2017 WTII Records 2017.
- Reality - Electronic Saviors: Industrial Music To Cure Cancer Volume V: Remembrance Metropolis Records 2018.
- Depression - Sounds from the Asylum Snide 2018.
