= WTII Records =

American independent record label

- Founded: 2001; 25 years ago
- Founder: Bart Pfanenstiel
- Genre: Electronic, industrial, EBM, synthpop, ambient, post-punk, electropop, electronic rock
- Country of origin: United States
- Location: Louisville, Kentucky (formerly Chicago, Illinois)
- Official website: "Official site". Archived from the original on July 16, 2019.

WTII Records is an independent record label created in 2001 by former Wax Trax! Records employee Bart Pfanenstiel together with David Schock.

== History ==
=== WTII established ===
The concept behind WTII began in 1999, while Bart Pfanenstiel was employed at Wax Trax! During Wax Trax!'s final year, Pfanenstiel and Dannie Flesher (co-founder of Wax Trax!) were moving Wax Trax into the modern era of electro/industrial music. They did this by tapping into a new breed of bands that were making their way to the US from Europe. Pfanenstiel had made a connection with Stefan Herwig of Offbeat Records. The two discussed licensing possibilities; the first of those opportunities came with the signing of VNV Nation to Wax Trax!. At the time, Wax Trax!'s parent label TVT had decided to move in a different direction, shutting down the Wax Trax! offices in Chicago, and Pfanenstiel had created a new label to capitalize on these opportunities. Jim Nash (co-founder of Wax Trax!) and Dannie Flesher had taught Pfanenstiel how to manage a label. After Jim Nash's death, Bart worked with Flesher on all label activities. Bart Pfanenstiel wanted to create a label that would rekindle the spirit of Wax Trax!'s early years.

With a roster of available artists, Pfanenstiel sought out the help of David Schock, who had experience working at a small independent music distributor. Schock had built strong relationships with mom-n-pop, brick and mortar and chain stores nationwide. WTII Records, LLC was officially launched on January 1, 2001.

=== 2001–2006 ===
The label's initial plan was to build a roster and catalog through licensing established artists from Europe. The first three artists licensed by WTII were In Strict Confidence, Melotron, and Controlled Fusion. WTII 001, In Strict Confidence's Love Kills! was officially released on March 14, 2001. The booklet for Love Kills! was a limited run 20 page velum booklet that had to be specially printed.

Over the first five years, the label continued to grow and build a solid catalog and fan base. The label adhered to its initial plan and added well-established artists, including: Stromkern, Beborn Beton, HMB, Arcanta, cut.rate.box, La Floa Maldita, Backlash, Acumen Nation and Regenerator. When the core roster was solidified, the labels expansion changed focus and the goal transitioned from signing established artists towards developing new talent. The label signed and released debut albums from newer bands such as State of the Union, Trigger 10d, Monstrum Sepsis, and PTI.

The label's first two major tours occurred in 2002, as Beborn Beton toured the United States as the opening act for Apoptygma Berzerk. The tour coincided with the release of Beborn Beton's greatest hits album, Tales From Another World. The band Stromkern initially toured the country in support of their album Armageddon; they then followed the first tour with a second tour in support of the Re-align EP.

In 2003 the label held its first festival, WTII Minifest, a two-day celebration of the label's first two years. The event was held at the Underground Lounge on Friday and the Bottom Lounge on Saturday; it featured performances from Monstrum Sepsis, Trigger 10d, cut.rate.box, State of the Union and HMB.

Album releases in 2004 included Stromkern's back catalog, Flicker Like a Candle and Dammerung im Traum, the Trigger 10d remix album But the Girl's the Same, State of the Union's sophomore album Inpendum, and the debut of PTI.

In 2005, Stromkern released their DAC #1 single "Stand Up", followed by the critically acclaimed album Light It Up. The band attended several festival dates and a full North American Tour with fellow label mates PTI. Additionally, they released a second single from their new album, "Reminders", and began 2006 with a second tour of the US and Europe with industrial band Front Line Assembly.

In 2006, the label celebrated its 5th anniversary via a promotional compilation titled The 5 Year Hits, also known as the WTII 5th Anniversary Compilation. The album was a mix CD which featured the labels club hits. It also contained a track from every artist on the WTII roster. Mixing was accomplished by Chicago DJs Jeff Moyer and DJ Pulz-8; mastering by Chris Randall of Sister Machine Gun. The CDs were given away at shows, clubs and conventions across the United States. They can still be downloaded for free on the WTII website.

Over these first 5 years of existence, WTII experienced success in licensing tracks and musical snippets to high-profile TV stations, independent films and video games. Signed bands such as State of the Union, Stromkern, Trigger 10d, and Monstrum Sepsis had tracks appear in episodes of MTV's Made, My Super Sweet 16, and Trailer Fabulous. Monstrum Sepsis's music appeared on A&E's Biography and Vh1's Driven. Stromkern's song "Stand Up" appeared in a SpikeTV's webisode called Death Guild as well as being included in the video game Project Gotham Racing 3. Monstrum Sepsis's song "Mace" appeared in The Matrix: Reloaded and Monstrum Sepsis scored the soundtrack to the online Matrix: Reloaded video game. Music from Trigger 10d and HMB was used in the independent film Shut-Eye, with HMB's song "Impulse" included as the title track.

=== 2007–2010 ===
During this time period, the label's musical focus and roster continued to diversify; however the emphasis remained on developing new artists. In 2007 the label included electronic rock in their music with the signing of New York-based band The Qualia. They also released the third and final single from Stromkern's Light It Up album.

In 2008, the label released albums from State of the Union and Monstrum Sepsis. They also signed electro/alternative act The Thought Criminals. Towards the end of 2008, the band The Gothsicles was signed. In 2009, the label signed and released a greatest hits collection from industrial band Dessau, released a single from The Thought Criminals, and signed gothic band Attrition.

In 2010, the label added another new artist, the cold wave band Am.Psych. They also released sophomore albums from The Qualia and Trigger10d.

At the end of 2010, WTII's success caught the attention of members from Nail Distribution. The label began negotiating a deal that would provide full distribution coverage across North America. In December 2010, an agreement was reached between the two parties. This international agreement was a notable step forward for the label. This increase in success allowed the label to begin focusing on artist promotion and development.

=== 2011–2016 ===
In 2011, the band created a new distribution network and catalog of upcoming releases. The label signed UK band Method Cell, their album Curse of a Modern Age was the first album released using the new distribution network. Later that year, the label signed and released albums from Canadian hardcore industrial artist Stiff Valentine, Claus Larsen's (Leæther Strip) alter ego Klutae, Swedish synthpop/electronic rock band Lowe, and Pittsburgh's industrial act Rein[Forced]. In addition to these new acts, the label released music from The Gothsicles and The Qualia.

In the summer of 2011, WTII celebrated its 10th anniversary with Minifest 2, a 4-day festival which featured performances from WTII artists Trigger 10d, Am.Psych, Rein[Forced], The Gothsicles, Stiff Valentine, Dead on TV, Stromkern and other local and national acts. Throughout the year there were also performances worldwide from The Gothsicles, The Qualia, Stiff Valentine, Rein[Forced], Method Cell, Klutae and Attrition. The year ended with an east coast tour from Lowe. The highlight of their tour was a CMJ (College Music Journal) showcase in New York City.

Beginning in 2012, Stromkern made their return with the release of a new EP. The label expansion and diversity continued as a larger mix of new and established artists were added. Following their performance at the Minifest 2, electro-punk band Dead on TV made their WTII debut in the spring, along with the release of their EP Fuck You, I'm Famous. Analog noise manipulator band Prometheus Burning made their label debut in the fall with the release of Kill It with Fire. The label compiled its first free mp3 compilations which included tracks from all artists signed to the label. This compilation was available for download on their website, Amazon.com, iTunes and several others. Near the end of the year, the label released a remix album from Stiff Valentine as well as a new album from Rein[Forced].

In 2013, WTII signed two London-based bands, Mechanical Cabaret and Deviant UK. Signing both artists included multiple releases. Mechanical Cabaret released a "Best of" compilation album called Selective Hearing in March. They also released a new album in October. Deviant UK released North American versions of two of their albums. The label also added the band SMP (Sounds of Mass Production) and released their album called Death of the Format. Another two new bands, Blume and Die Sektor, released albums in the fall on the label. The albums Autumn Ruins by Blume and (-)existence by Die Sektor have reached to the top 10 in various album charts and several festival around the world.

In the fall of 2013, the label entered into an overseas distribution agreement with Planetworks Entertainment. WTII focused on the North American network and Planetworks maintained overseas markets.

In 2014, the label oversaw new releases from State of the Union and Mechanical Cabaret and also signed the bands Slave Unit, Autoclav1.1, AlterRed and Stars Crusaders.

In 2015, the label released a new single by Mechanical Cabaret and a new EP by The Gothsicles. These releases were followed by the digital release of Stromkern's limited-edition version of Armageddon. In March, the label released the first new material from Sister Machine Gun in 7 years. The band Regenerator also rejoined the label, releasing their first new album in 6 years. Industrial supergroup Deathproof made their debut under the label, and both Autoclav1.1 and Stars Crusaders released new material. The label re-issued a remastered version of Mechanical Cabaret's debut album with unreleased tracks and bonus remixes. In the fall of 2015, the label signed tribal/noise powerhouse band ESA and released the third album of their Themes of Carnal Empowerment trilogy to positive reviews. The label also entered into a new partnership with Austin, Texas-based band CHANT, who subsequently toured with the popular industrial band KMFDM. Towards the end of 2015, Chicago based band Comasoft released the EP Let's Go All the Way. ESA and Stars Crusaders finished 2015 with two new digital EPs released under the label.

2016 marked the 15th Anniversary of the label. The first release of 2016 was the debut from the Canadian EBM band nTTx.

== Overview ==
Over the years the label roster has continued to grow with artists that vary in sound and style. The label has overseen releases from artists like Stromkern, Autoclav1.1, Prometheus Burning, SMP, Slave Unit, Sister Machine Gun, Deathproof, Beborn Beton, Deviant UK, AlterRed, ESA (Electronic Substance Abuse), Mechanical Cabaret, Blume, State of the Union, Trigger 10d, The Thought Criminals, The Gothsicles, Dessau, Die Sektor, Frontal Boundary, Attrition, In Strict Confidence, Monstrum Sepsis, Klutae, Trigger 10d, Stiff Valentine, Method Cell, Lowe, Stars Crusaders, The Qualia, cut.rate.box, Dead on TV, Rein Forced, PTI, Backlash, am.psych, and HMB.

== Distribution ==
The label is currently distributed worldwide by MVD (Music and Video Distribution) former distributors include NAIL Distribution, a Division of the Allegro Media Group and Planetworks Entertainment.

== Artist roster ==
- Acumen Nation
- AlterRed
- am.psych
- Arcanta
- Attrition
- Autoclav1.1
- Backlash
- Beborn Beton
- Blume
- Controlled Fusion
- cut.rate.box
- Dead on TV
- Deathproof
- Dessau
- Deviant UK
- Die Sektor
- ESA (Electronic Substance Abuse)
- Frontal Boundary
- HMB
- In Strict Confidence
- Klutæ
- La Floa Maldita
- Lowe
- Melotron
- Mechanical Cabaret
- Method Cell
- Monstrum Sepsis
- nTTx
- Prometheus Burning
- PTI
- Regenerator
- Rein[Forced]
- Sister Machine Gun
- Slave Unit
- SMP
- Stars Crusaders
- State of the Union
- Stiff Valentine
- The Gothsicles
- The Qualia
- The Thought Criminals
- Trigger 10d

== See also ==
- List of record labels
- Industrial music
- Wax Trax! Records
