= Little Red Wolf =

Little Red Wolf are a Madison, Wisconsin-based band with styles ranging from alt-country to folk-rock and traditional pop. The four-piece is known for being multi-instrumentalist with female-led vocals and harmonies. Little Red Wolf members with primary instruments: Emily Mills (drums), Kelly Maxwell (guitar), Meghan Rose (piano and guitar), Laura Detert (viola and bass guitar). Other instrumentation includes accordion, bass ukulele, mandolin, clarinet, keytar, and glockenspiel.

== Discography ==
Little Red Wolf released a full-length album titled If Only We Were Just Like We Are independently on December 11, 2010. The album was engineered, mixed and mastered by John Feith at SubFloral Studios.

If Only We Were Remixed was released February 8, 2011 and features remixes of 6 songs from the full-length record by Madison-based electronic artists: Null Device, Caustic, Black Jack Red Queen, and The Dark Clan. It was mastered by Eric Oehler of Null Device at Submersible Studios in Madison.

On June 26, 2014, Little Red Wolf released their second independently released full-length album, Junk Sparrow. The album was recorded by Brian Liston at Clutch Sound and then mixed by him after a successful Kickstarter campaign.

== Performances ==
Little Red Wolf performed with Bitch, Erin McKeown, Athens Boys Choir and Tiffany at the 2011 Fruit Fest in Madison. They've also played with Girl in a Coma and Company of Thieves. The group has also played shows to benefit Domestic Abuse Intervention Services in Madison, various renewable energy causes and events, Primates, Inc., and the Madison chapter of Girls Rock Camp.

== Awards and nominations ==
Little Red Wolf was rated Madison's Favorite New Band in the 2009 Isthmus Annual Manual.

If Only We Were Just Like We Are was nominated for best alternative album at the Madison Area Music Awards in 2011. Other nominations include Bella in the Elm for best alternative song, and Sunshine for best blues song.

The band came in second place in the 2011 Isthmus Favorite's reader poll for "Favorite Folk/Bluegrass Band."

== Reviews and Profiles ==
- "Reviewing the Neighbors: 'If Only We Were Just Like We Are' by Little Red Wolf" by Paul Tatro for dane101.com
- "Reviewing the Neighbors: Little Red Wolf's 'If Only We Were Remixed'" by Kat Kosiec for dane101.com
- Profile of Little Red Wolf in Maximum Ink Magazine
