= Abstinence (band) =

American experimental music group

- Origin: Belmar, New Jersey, U.S.
- Genres: Industrial, noise, performance art
- Years active: 1985–present
- Labels: s6k Media, Furnace Records, Silent Records
- Members: Darryl Montogomery; John Bechdel; David Dodson

Abstinence is an American experimental industrial music project founded in 1985 in Belmar, New Jersey, and now based in Brooklyn, New York. Their sound ranges from bombastic to noise, ambient soundtrack to industrial music and uses video/audio dialog and sound samples.

== Discography ==
=== Full length albums and EPs ===
- Revolt of the Cyberchrist (1994, Furnace Records/Silent Records) – #18 CMJ RPM Charts
- Theorem (1995, Furnace/Silent)
- The Path of Maximum Resistance (2005, s6k media)
- Delusions of Architecture (2014, Furnace Records/Voidstar Productions)

=== Singles ===
- Frigid 12" EP (1994, Furnace/Silent)

=== Compilation appearances ===
- Hellscape (1995, Furnace/Silent) includes the songs "Interference" and "Screaming Into the Void VSmix: (Virtually Silent Mix)"
- New Industries (1995, Dynamica Records – Germany) includes the song "Frigid Changes"
- Hellscape 2 (1995, Furnace/Silent) includes the song "Fractured/Assassinate the Beat"
- Operation:Beatbox (1996, Reconstriction Records/Cargo Records) includes the song "Two-Three-Break"
- Ikebana: Merzbow's Amlux Rebuilt, Reused And Recycled (2003, Important Records) includes the song "Freq"
- The Unreasonable: Voidstar Productions XXV Year Anniversary Compilation (2015, Voidstar Productions) includes the song "Multiple Beat Revolt (MSTREdit)"

=== Filmography ===
- Backyard Glances soundtrack Alva Skateboards (1987) includes the song "Level 7"
- Multiple Cross Wounds unreleased video (1991)

== Members ==
=== Current ===
- Darryl "Hell" Montgomery (1985–present)
- John Bechdel (1993–1996, 2004–present)
- David "Deftly-D" Dodson (2004–present)
- Brian "Beat" Senders (2009–present)

=== Past members ===
- Steve Herring
- Bill Kuegler
- Mike Roberts
- Eloise Mourning
- Paul Raven
- J. Burns
- Jerry Franklin
- Bill Latshaw
- Tommy Latshaw
- Tommy Walling
- Mark Yard
- Mike Scrivani
- Greg Hunt
- Terry Hughes

== Related bands ==
- Operation Mindwipe
- Rock'it Society
- Patient 4311
- Nau-Zee-auN
- Zero Times Infinity
- Terrorfakt
- Mon -O- Taur
- Machine Age Madness
- MMOS
- Digital Disturbance
