= Caustic (band) =

American band

- Origin: Madison, Wisconsin, United States
- Genres: EBM, Industrial, powernoise
- Years active: 2002–present
- Labels: Metropolis; Crunch Pod; Static Sky; Sonic Mainline; Negative Gain Productions
- Members: Matt Fanale

Caustic is an American industrial band based out of Madison, Wisconsin, United States, created in 2002 by DJ Matt Fanale (a.k.a. Eurotic), who is the sole consistent member. The band's live lineup varies quite a bit, largely depending on the location of the show. Caustic's lyrics are typically humorous, while the music itself ranges between older styled industrial and more modern styled powernoise.

Caustic has performed live at a number of international industrial music festivals, including the 2005 and 2006 Providence Industrial Festival and the 2006 Blacksun, Reverence, Indoctrination, and the UK's Infest Festival in 2007.

== Background ==
=== History ===
Originally the debut album, Unicorns, Kittens, and Shit, was supposed to be released by Static Sky Records in early 2006, but due to production issues surrounding the CD liner notes, the release of the album was pushed back until summer 2006. After Static Sky Records closed, Caustic moved to the Crunch Pod label. The debut album is listed as a co-release between the then defunct Static Sky Records and Crunch Pod. Caustic has enjoyed moderate success in 2006 with the release of Unicorns, Kittens, and Shit, which hit number 1 on Metropolis Records' mail-order site. Caustic's second full-length Booze Up and Riot propelled the project even further, with a follow-up planned for late 2008 on Crunch Pod. In the meantime Caustic has also released several split EPs and CDR releases, as well.

Matt Fanale has been in side projects such as m00ntz! (with Eric Oehler (Null Device) and Chuck Spencer (Stochastic Theory)), as well as currently with Parasite Twin (with Brian Schuh), and Prude, with Chemlab's Jared Louche, Cyanotic's Sean Payne, and Plastic Heroes' Marc Plastic.

Perhaps one of Caustic's more famous songs is "Kill AFI" Written in response to post-punk band AFI's song on Decemberunderground "Kill Caustic". The title of that song, however, had nothing to do with Caustic.

In 2010, right before the release of And You Will Know Me By The Trail of Vomit, Fanale publicly declared he gave up drinking, frequently blogging about his experiences with his alcoholism. The song "White Knuckle Head Fuck" on 2011's The Golden Vagina of Fame and Profit is specifically about his dealing with withdrawal.

=== Genre and style ===
Caustic can largely be described as industrial and/or powernoise, with a more humorous and self-deprecating tone than similar acts:

I actually tried making serious music for a bit, but fortunately or unfortunately, nobody could take me seriously, so I went from wanting to be the next "grr spit industrial" project to what I am now. I kind of like the juxtaposition of trying to be as badass on stage as possible while screaming, "Tell me about my uterus!" As I've said before though, a good number of bands in the hard electronics scene are trying way too damn hard to be controversial and angry, spouting cliché after cliché, and it's become boring. I think having fun is a much better idea -- but being just as loud. I'd rather scream about handjobs than Christianity or Satan or Satanic Christianity any day, because at least that's something I like. Mmm...handjobs. However, I definitely don't want to be seen as a "joke band," but more like the Mr. Bungle of industrial -- without the talent.

Fanale has claimed Caustic's genre to be "Jizzcore," as a joke about the amount of self-indulgent, artist-created subgenres in industrial.

Influences Matt Fanale has referenced include Revolting Cocks, Hank III, Pop Will Eat Itself, Chemlab, Atari Teenage Riot, and Stromkern, as well as the comedians Doug Stanhope, Bill Hicks, and Louis CK.

=== Live ===
Live performances are often noted for the often frenetic interaction with the audience and the band's surroundings, characterized by mild drunken belligerence. Forties were often on prominent display. Bizarre costumes and frenetic lightshows are also a staple:

I've pissed off some people at live shows.... Some dipshit at my first Seattle show was grumpy about the Caustic live set because we were apparently "making fun of the scene," or something like that. I think my pal Krass, in drag and playing cowbell, and Darren (formerly of Backandtotheleft/Noxious Emotion) on drums, shirtless and rubbing his chest against the window of where we were playing, had something to do with it.

...

I believe in giving a show. I believe in having some live shit actually going on, and I believe in having a good time. People avoid shows in this scene, and I'm talking industrial in general, because there isn't a show. Most people [who perform] are just standing there twisting knobs and looking like they're checking their email. Boring. Bo-fucking-ring.

I like screaming at an audience, having them scream back and looking like a jackass. I'd rather show too much of my stupid personality than not, and be remembered for looking like a moron than just standing there like some bored chump. Mind you, there are exceptions to every rule, but when I pay to see a show I want to see an actual show, and that's what we try to do. We're incorporating video now, too, so the dumb possibilities are becoming endless.

Caustic was set to open for 5 dates of the 2006 KMFDM/COMBICHRIST tour, but managed to get kicked off within 24 hours.

Of note is Caustic's last performance of 2006 at the Indoctrination Festival in Chicago in which Fanale commandeer the event's video projector to project gay porn onto the band (consisting of Fanale and the Gothsicles). He also taped his microphone to his chin with clear duct tape, festooned the stage with pages from a gay pornographic magazine, sprayed the audience with a douche, had a rubber chicken shoved down his pants as well as taped to his head and arm, and, after assailing the audience with the rubber chicken repeatedly, was handed a bouquet of roses with the chicken taped to it.

== Discography ==
=== Full length albums and EPs ===
- I Am On Fire EP Sonic Mainline (2004)
- Unicorns, Kittens, and Shit Static Sky / Crunch Pod (2006)
- Booze Up And Riot Crunch Pod (2007)
- Savage Lands (split disc) Coreline Media Projects (2008)
- I Am On Fire MEGAFLAMER EDITION Crunch Pod (2008)
- This is Jizzcore 2CD Crunch Pod (2009)
- And you will know me by the trail of Vomit... Independent release (2010)
- The Golden Vagina of Fame and Profit Metropolis Records (U.S.)/L-Tracks Recordings (Europe) (2011)
- The Man Who Couldn't Stop Metropolis Records (2012)
- Industrial Music Negative Gain (2015)
- American Carrion Independent release (2018)
- Buggy Submersible Studios (2023)
- Thirsty Dog Submersible Studios (2025)

=== Special releases ===
- Meld Endif vs. Caustic split CDr Sonic Mainline Records / Thirdwave Collective (2005)
- Rainbows, Puppies, & Crap special mp3 album available for download (2006)
- Give Me Free Handjobs free online remix ep (2006)
- High Art for Low Expectations Caustic vs. Justin Mathew Mooney split CDr Sonic Mainline (2007)
- Binge Drinking Special Edition (accompanying CDR with Booze Up and Riot- 200 ltd edition) (2007)
- Hangover Special Edition (limited CDR sold singly or with Booze Up and Riot- 200 ltd edition) (2007)
- Douche Ex Machina (remix CDR limited to Kickstarter.com backers only- 100 copies) Independent release (2011)
- Not Your Body Caustic vs Grabyourface split Independent release

=== Compilation appearances ===
- Decadent Tongue on Electroculture Sampler Volume 1 from www.electrogarden.com (2004)
- Drag Show Gone Wrong on Electro/R/Evolution Volume 1 Static Sky Records (2005)
- Your Stupid Fucking Face on Friends of Brokecore Vol. 2 CDr Brokecore (2005)
- Rapidly Punching the Soft Spot on Das Bunker: Fear of a Distorted Planet 2CD Das Bunker (2006)
- Digital Mangina on "Endzeit Bunkertracks: Act II" 4CD Alfa Matrix (2006)
- Romophobia on New Input Noise compilation (2006)
- Drag Show Gone Wrong (imperfect mix by Stochastic Theory) on Silver Echo Records Presents, Vol 1 (2006)
- MMM Papscraper I Love You (Cervello Elettronico mix) on Septic VII compilation Dependent (2007)
- MMM Papscraper I Love You (Cervello Elettronico Original mix) on "Endzeit Bunkertracks: Act III" 4CD Alfa Matrix (2007)
- Dare To Be Stupid on Electronic Saviors Presents: Respect the Prime 1986 Revisited (2016)

=== Remixes ===
- Enemy Within (Battle for New Orleans mix) on The Rogue Pair by C/A/T
- Enhancer (Triple D Cl0b mix) on ATF by C/A/T
- Databass (Caustic Floorwhore mix) on The Blackout Remixes by PTI
- Falling Behind (Catching Up mix) on Dialogue by Stochastic Theory
- Sleeper Cell (meamthereaper mix) on Meld by Endif
- Turn Signals Are Still Cool (Pimp My Rhyme Mix) on NESferatu by The Gothsicles
- Small Time Pedophile (Caustic's Gary Glitter Mix) on 'This Is What We Seek' by W.A.S.T.E.
- Here (Chuck Tolerates Caustic Mix) on 'Opposite Extremes' by Stochastic Theory
- Traffek (Street Legal Mix) by Sleep Clinic
- The Last Tribe (you suck off hobos mix) by Replogen
- Heavy (big boned mix) by GASR
- Let Me Tell You Something (Pogue Mahone mix) by The Azoic
- Orange and Black (Dia del Muerte Mix) by God Module
- Cluckwerk (Communal Beef Mix) by The Operative
- Dark Days and Red Nights (Red Dawn Mix) by Penal Colony
- Noize Junky (Loud Noises Mix) by Floppy Disk
- Rain Expedition (Caustic Remix) by on 'The Rain Expedition EP' by Phantom West
- Animal (In Bed Mix) by Terrorfakt
- Dented Halos (Vintage Mix) by Cylab
- And Some Other Dead Stuff (Caustic Mix) by Severe Illusion
- Gothicke Nocturne (Eternal Mix) on 'Vampires Dance!' by The Dark Clan
- Prince of E-ville (Mix by Caustic) on 'Frost EP: Sent to Destroy' by Combichrist
- Balloon Song (Caustic's Static Cling Mix) on 'If Only We Were Remixed' EP by Little Red Wolf

== List of band members ==
=== Studio and live ===
- Matt Fanale (2002–present) -- vocals, programming, mixing

=== Live only ===
Though Caustic's studio production is essentially entirely from Fanale, when Caustic tours, other musicians often join the band for the live show. The following are some of the artists that have joined Caustic for one or more performances.

- Ben Arp (of C/A/T)
- Jason Hollis (of Endif)
- Josev F. (of CTRLSHFT)
- Maehymn (of CTRLSHFT)
- sal0cin (of Empusae)
- :EYG:
- Charles Nelson Reilly (of Match Game, R.I.P. brother)
- Darren Miller (formerly of Backandtotheleft/Noxious Emotion)
- darkNES (of The Gothsicles)
- HELLRAVER (of Terrorfakt)
- Sheena Easton and her sugar walls
- Eric Eldredge (of Interface)
- David Christian (of Cervello Elettronico)
- M4RC (of Grendel)
- Eric Gottesman (of Everything Goes Cold/See Colin Slash)
- Dan Clark (of The Dark Clan/Null Device/Stromkern)
- DEATHKEY (of DEATHKEY)
- Severina X Sol (of Cylab/The Breakup/Sol Sirenn)
- Thee Databomb
- Edgey
- Deftly-D (of Nau-Zee-auN/Zero Times Infinity/Abstinence/HSM)
- Mika G. (of This Morn' Omina- live cover only)
- ffej and B.O.B. (of Sensuous Enemy)
- Eric Dusik (of PTI/Breath and Decay)
- skot (of Beta Virus)
- Keef Baker
- Clint Sand (of Synnack/formerly cut.rate.box)
- Meansalley (of Servitor Sanctum 7)
- Jasyn Bangert (of God Module)
- Eric Oehler (of Null Device)
- Emily Mills (of Little Red Wolf)
- Andrew Davies (of DoublePlusTen)
- Rodney Linderman (of The Dead Milkmen)
