= List of industrial music labels =

General Information
- Related genres (partial): Dark ambient; electro-industrial; EBM; experimental; industrial rock; industrial metal; power electronics; power noise; witch house
- Location: Worldwide

The following is a list of music labels that predominantly feature industrial music styles and that have released or distributed work by one or more notable industrial music artists or bands.

The releases for each of the labels here listed can be categorized by one of the many industrial music genres for the entirety of, or a significant portion of, the label's lifetime. For the purposes of this list we are using a maximally inclusive definition of "industrial" music, taking a cue from S. Alexander Reed's characterization of genre as "both hazy and changing over time." Therefore, some labels, such as Cleopatra, Mute, and Play It Again Sam that began as predominantly industrial music labels but diversified over the years are included due to their significant contributions to the genre during those periods.

Many of the listed labels shared bands and artists due to licensing agreements meant to increase distribution in different markets and geographic areas; e.g.: Cleopatra & Zoth Ommog, Metropolis & Off Beat, Wax Trax! & Play It Again Sam. Likewise, some of these labels revived the back catalog of others that have closed, e.g.: Infacted with Zoth Ommog & Bloodline, Metropolis with 21st Circuitry & Pendragon, etc. Several labels spawned sub-labels to differentiate between styles; any of which that meet the genre definitions above are included separately in the list with relationships indicated.

== Labels ==
Name	Year		Selected Notable Acts	Notes
13th Planet Records	2005	(United States)	Ministry; Prong; Revolting Cocks	Founded by Ministry frontman Al Jourgensen.
21st Circuitry	1991	(United States)	Covenant; Hate Dept.; New Mind; Scar Tissue; Steril; Unit:187; Xorcist	A San Francisco record label, acquired by Metropolis in 1999.
A Different Drum	1996	(United States)	Blume; Code 64; De/Vision; Neuroactive; T.O.Y.	An independent record label and online store specializing in synthpop and related genres and founded by Todd Durrant. The label held a yearly Synthpop Music Festival which ran for 3 years, from 2004 to 2006; in Salt Lake City, Utah at the Red Lion Hotel. A selection of songs from the label's artists have been featured on various versions of Konami's Dance Dance Revolution series, including the arcade version of Dance Dance Revolution X.
Accession Records	1996	(Germany)	Assemblage 23; Cleaner/Cleen; Lights of Euphoria; Panzer AG; [:SITD:]	Founded by Adrian Hates.
Ad Noiseam	2001	(Germany)	Black Lung; Hecate; Hecq; Scorn	Founded by Nicolas Chevreux. Originally started out as a webzine but quickly moved on to being a record-label.
AFM Records	1996	(Germany)	Eisbrecher; Fear Factory; Gothminister; Ministry	Metal-oriented music label based in Schwalmstadt, Germany.
Alfa Matrix	2001	(Belgium)	Armageddon Dildos; Ayria; Bruderschaft; Dunkelwerk; Front 242; I:Scintilla; Komor Kommando; Leæther Strip; Mentallo and the Fixer; Unter Null	Founded by staff members of Side-Line magazine, Séba Dolimont, Bernard Van Isacker, and Benoît Blanchart.
Alien8 Recordings	1996	(Canada)	Aube; Knurl; Merzbow; Tim Hecker	Canadian label founded by Sean O'Hara and Gary Worsley.
Ant Zen	1992	(Germany)	Aube; Black Lung; Morgenstern; Sonar; Vromb	Established in Germany by Stefan Alt and Alex Pickar. The name is derived from the phrase "Anti-Zensur" ("anti-censorship"). Ant Zen also runs several boutique sub-labels including Bazooka Joe, Delikatessen Records, Duebel, Flyco, Hymen Records, and Mirex.
Antler / Antler-Subway Records	1982	(Belgium)	A Split-Second; Consolidated; Klinik; The Neon Judgement; Noise Unit; Poésie Noire; Siglo XX; Vomito Negro	Belgian label founded in Aarschot by music producer Roland Beelen. In 1989, Antler merged with Maurice Engelen's (of Lords Of Acid) New Beat imprint Subway Records. The label was influential in EBM & New Beat during its early years but shifted towards a more dance & techno roster during the 90s.
Artificial Sun	2012	(Russia)	Distorted World; Type V Blood	Established to distribute records by industrial bands and artists mainly on territory of Russia, CIS and Europe and Naveen.
Artoffact Records	1999	(Canada)	Aesthetic Perfection; cEvin Key; Download; Juno Reactor; Noise Unit; Psyche; Steril	Founded by Jacek Kozlowski
Avalanche Recordings	1999	(United Kingdom)	Final; Godflesh; Jesu	Founded by English musician Justin Broadrick in 1999. It is named after Broadrick's own recording studio, Avalanche Studios, and mainly releases Justin Broadrick's side projects.
Bain Total	1977	(France)	Die Form	Founded by French photographer, Philippe Fichot, who used the label to primarily release his work as Die Form as well as other experimental music artists.
Beyond Therapy Records	2010	(United States)	Finite Automata	Founded in Orlando, Florida by Ben V of Ludovico Technique in 2010.
Bloodline	2000	(Germany)	Behind the Scenes; Decoded Feedback; Echo Image; Funker Vogt; In Strict Confidence; Leæther Strip; Lights of Euphoria; Melotron; Neuroticfish; S.P.O.C.K; Unheilig; XPQ-21	Founded by Torben Schmidt after Zoth Ommog went defunct
Body Records	1981	(Belgium)	Absolute Body Control; Algebra Suicide; Blackhouse; Dive; Klinik	Founded by Dirk Ivens of Absolute Body Control. Distributed in part by Antler Records.
Celtic Circle Productions	1992	(Germany)	yelworC	Founded by Alfred Kaenders. Spawned sub-label Khazad-Dûm and produced compilation releases for Side-Line and Vertigo. The label ceased operations in 1998 after experiencing financial difficulties.
Cleopatra Records	1992	(United States)	see Category:Cleopatra Records artists (60)	Founded in Los Angeles by Brian Perera. It started out as a primarily industrial-gothic imprint that imported many European bands to the US, but has since grown into a more diverse direction and spawned a family of labels, including Hypnotic Records, Purple Pyramid Records, Deadline Music Records, and X-Ray Records.
Cold Meat Industry	1987	(Sweden)	Arcana; Ataraxia; Brighter Death Now; Deutsch Nepal; In Slaughter Natives; Raison d'être	Founded by Roger Karmanik, and specialized in niche music genres such as dark ambient, death industrial, and neoclassical dark wave.
Cold Spring	1990	(United Kingdom)	C.C.C.C.; Genesis P-Orridge; Laibach; Psychic TV; Merzbow; Sol Invictus; Z'EV	Founded by Justin Mitchell and based in Northamptonshire, England, specialising in "all forms of extreme media, but particularly: Dark ambient, Neo-classical/Neo-folk, Orchestral, Power Electronics/Noise, Japanese Noise, Minimal, Death Industrial, Dark Soundtracks, Experimental, obscure electronics from Russia, China, Japan, and Poland.
Come Organisation	1979	(United Kingdom)	Come; Nurse With Wound; Whitehouse (band)	Founded by William Bennett initially as a means for releasing his own music as Come.
Contempo International	1984	(Italy)	Attrition; Clock DVA; Lassigue Bendthaus	Founded by Giampiero Barlotti. Shares a name with a record shop in Firenze, Italy from where the label was formed. First active from 1984 to 1995, Contempo specialized in electronic, industrial, and post-punk. The label has since relaunched with a focus on indie and rock genres.
COP International	1991	(Germany) (United States)	see Category:COP International artists (13)	Founded in 1991 by Christian Petke (a.k.a. Count Zero of Deathline Int'l.) in Frankfurt, Germany. A few months later his girlfriend, Kim "X" Nguyen, opened a branch office in Oakland, CA. Among the more notable of the label's releases were the female-focused, "Diva X Machina" compilations series.
Cyberware Productions	1993	(Finland)	Neuroactive; Terminal Choice	
Daft Records	1991	(Belgium)	Absolute Body Control; Dive; Esplendor Geometrico; Sonar	Dirk Ivens' second label, after Body Records.
Dais Records	2007	(United States)	Cold Cave; Genesis P-Orridge; High Functioning Flesh; Stephen Mallinder; Youth Code	Founded by musicians Gibby Miller and Ryan Martin.
Dancing Ferret Discs	1998	(United States)	Absurd Minds; The Crüxshadows; Eisbrecher; Paralysed Age	Established by Patrick Rodgers (a.k.a. DJ Ferret) in 1995 with the formation of sister company Dancing Ferret Concerts.
Darkest Labyrinth	2000	(Japan)	Angelspit; Blood; GPKism; Spectrum-X	First called Cure, Starwave Records started as an Osaka-based project to release works by label-owner Kiwamu's own band Blood. The label changed names to Darkest Labyrinth and expanded to distribute music by international Gothic and Post-Industrial artists in Japan.
Decibel	1994	(United States)	Alien Faktor; Oneiroid Psychosis	Founded by composer Tom Muschitz in Milwaukee, Wisconsin.
Dependent Records	1999	(Germany)	see Category:Dependent Records artists (29)	An EBM "mega label" founded by former Off Beat A&R manager Stefan Herwig along with Eskil Simonsson (Covenant), Johan Van Roy (Suicide Commando), Bryan Erickson (Velvet Acid Christ), and Ronan Harris (VNV Nation).
Digital Hardcore Recordings	1994	(Germany)	Alec Empire; Atari Teenage Riot; EC8OR; Hanin Elias; Nic Endo	Established by Alec Empire, Joel Amaretto and Pete Lawton and based in Berlin.
Discordia	1992	(Germany)	Dive; Esplendor Geometrico; Fiction 8; Kirlian Camera; VNV Nation	Closed in 1997 and re-emerged as Triton. Ran a sub-label, Taste This, to release the Taste This compilation series.
Dossier	1985	(Germany)	Chrome; Controlled Bleeding; Delerium; Front Line Assembly; Noise Unit; Psychic TV; Throbbing Gristle; Vampire Rodents	Founded by Manfred Schiek.
Durtro	1990	(United Kingdom)	Current 93	Formed by David Tibet of Current 93, mainly for releasing his own records.
Dynamica	1993	(Germany)	Cubanate; Oomph!; Templebeat; Think About Mutation	Founded by Jor and Anna Rosen after the success of Machinery Records specifically to release industrial metal music. Both labels later came under the Noise Records banner, a label of Modern Music Records, but still continued to release music under their own names.
Earthly Delights	1986	(United Kingdom)	Caroline K; Nocturnal Emissions	Founded by Nigel Ayers of Nocturnal Emissions. The label's name refers to Hieronymous Bosch's painting The Garden of Earthly Delights.
Eerie Materials	1990	(United States)	Evolution Control Committee; Negativland	First based in Richmond, Virginia and later in San Francisco, California
Energy	1989	(Sweden)	Pouppée Fabrikk	A sub-label of Hot Stuff founded by Per Faeltenbor. Merged with the labels Front Music Production and Electronic Beat Association in 1990 to become Energy Rekords.
Energy Rekords	1990	(Sweden)	Cat Rapes Dog; Die Krupps; Pouppée Fabrikk; Scapa Flow; S.P.O.C.K	Formed in 1990 by the merging of the three labels: Front Music Production, Electronic Beat Association, and Energy - all small labels run from the Swedish town of Älmhult - founders Håkan Ehrnst, Krister Svensson and Per Faeltenborg. In 1998 Energy Rekords merged with October Records and added that label's bands to its roster.
Extreme Records	1985	(Australia)	Merzbow; Muslimgauze; Shinjuku Thief; Soma; Vidna Obmana	Founded by Ulex Xane and initially specialised in underground experimental and industrial cassettes. Roger Richards became involved in 1987 and eventually became the label's director after Xane's departure.
Fetish Records	1978	(United Kingdom)	23 Skidoo; Clock DVA; Stephen Mallinder; Throbbing Gristle	Founded by Rod Pearce, who adapted the name from a mail art t-shirt. It was also a home to the early works of graphic designer Neville Brody, who created artwork for releases as art director for the label. Fetish's final release was the compilation album The Last Testament in 1983, which featured a sleeve note written by Jon Savage.
Fifth Colvmn Records	1990	(United States)	see Category:Fifth Colvmn Records artists (26)	Founded by Zalman Fishman, owner of the nightclub FIFTH COLVMN, located in Washington D.C. Following an investigation for tax evasion, the Fifth Column nightclub closed in 1996. Although a separate entity, the label eventually suffered as well and ceased operation in 1997.
FiXT	2006	(United States)	Blue Stahli; Celldweller; Klayton; Varien	Founded out of Esion Media, the name under which Klayton published his earliest Celldweller material.
Fourth Dimension Records	1984	(United Kingdom)	Circle; KK Null; The Gerogerigegege	Founded by Gary Levermore as an offshoot of his Third Mind label before being taken over by Richard Johnson (aka Richo) in 1984.
Front Music Production	1987	(Sweden)	Cat Rapes Dog; Scapa Flow	Founded by Håkan Ehrns. In 1990 merged with the labels Energy (A Division Of Hot Stuff) and Electronic Beat Association to become Energy Rekords. Front Music Production was connected to Swiss label Art Sound Records. Both labels have been founded by Swiss/Sweden music magazine New Life.
Functional	1993	(Germany)	Brighter Death Now	A division of Tesco Organisation specializing in Industrial, Heavy Electronics and Noise. Mainly re-releasing sold out cassettes.
GPC Productions	1989	(United States)	Kevorkian Death Cycle; Mentallo and the Fixer; Non-Aggression Pact; Xorcist	A.k.a. "General Purpose Cassettes," founded in Newark, DE by Sloth (a member of Batz Without Flesh), Cliff Tkac (a member of XenophoN) and Alex Kane (of Sinister Attraction.)
GUN Records	1992	(Germany)	Apoptygma Berzerk; L'Âme Immortelle; Oomph!; SITD	German industrial, metal, and crossover label founded by Bogdan Kopec; ceased operations in 2009.
Hard Records	1992	(Denmark)	Decoded Feedback; Lights of Euphoria; Luc van Acker	Cophenhagen-based label and distributor founded by Christian Rosén.
Homestead Records	1983	(United States)	Einstürzende Neubauten; Swans	Distributor of Dutch East India Trading turned label; established by Barry Tenenbaum and Sam Berger.
Hospital Productions	1998	(United States)	Alessandro Cortini; Cold Cave; Controlled Bleeding; Prurient; Silent Servant; Vatican Shadow	Founded by Dominick Fernow and also operated as a physical record store.
Hypnobeat Records	1987	(Germany)	Autopsia; Evils Toy; Project Pitchfork	Founded by Oliver Roesch and distributed by Semaphore in Europe. Co-located with sister label Hyperium Records.
Hypnos	1996	(United States)	Austere; Jeff Greinke; Vidna Obmana	Established by M. Griffin to release his own recordings, but later expanded to distribute other ambient and drone artists including releases on the Binary and Hypnos Secret Sounds sub-labels.
Industrial Records	1976	(United Kingdom)	Category:Industrial Records artists (10)	Industrial Records is a record label established in 1976 by industrial music group and performance artists Throbbing Gristle. The group created the label primarily for self-releases but also signed several other groups and artists. The label gave a name to the industrial music genre.
Infacted Recordings	2003	(Germany)	Accessory; Colony 5; Decoded Feedback; Grendel; Heimatærde; Lights of Euphoria; Orange Sector; SITD	Founded by Torben Schmidt (formerly A&R Manager of the labels Zoth Ommog & Bloodline).
Invisible Records	1988	(United States)	Chris Connelly; Dead Voices on Air; Killing Joke; Lab Report; Murder, Inc.; Pigface; Sheep on Drugs	A Chicago-based record label founded by Martin Atkins. In 2001, Invisible Records started a subsidiary label, Underground Inc.
KK Records	1987	(Belgium)	Cat Rapes Dog; Controlled Bleeding; Kode IV; Lassigue Bendthaus; The Neon Judgement; Numb; Psychick Warriors ov Gaia; Test Dept; Vomito Negro	Belgian label that was influential with EBM/Industrial in the 2nd half of the 80s. During the 90s the style changed into some more experimental pop-electro before it dissolved around 2000. Spawned numerous sublabels including Electrip, Instinct Ambient Europe, KK Traxx, Madagascar, Nova Zembla, Radical Ambient, Terminal Antwerp, Ultraxx, Zazaboem.
Lens Records	1999	(United States)	Rapoon; Dead Voices on Air	Chicago-based record label founded by Robert Hyman.
Machinery Records	1989	(Germany)	And One; Black Lung; Cubanate; Dance or Die; New Mind; Oomph!; Snog; Swamp Terrorists; Syntec	Founded by Jor Jenka and Anna Rosen in Berlin, Germany. In 1991, Machinery came under the Noise Records banner, as part of the Modern Music Records group. By the end of the 1990s Machinery was releasing less music, with many of the original acts instead releasing on the Dynamica sub-label. When Modern Music was acquired by the Sanctuary Records Group in 2001, the Machinery imprint was dropped.
Memento Materia	1992	(Sweden)	Code 64; Covenant; Mesh	A Swedish record label focusing on synth-, electro- and futurepop, although it also released some EBM in the 1990s. In 2001, it formed Prototyp, a sublabel focusing on EBM, industrial and harder electro.
Metropolis Records	1993	(United States)	see Category:Metropolis Records artists (147)	Founded in Philadelphia, Pennsylvania in 1993 by Dave Heckman. The label's all-electronic format closely tracked with European contemporaries such as Off Beat and, since 1995, has been instrumental in promoting and distributing underground electronic music in America.
Minus Habens	1987	(Italy)	Blackhouse; Dive; Ivan Iusco	Founded by composer Ivan Iusco, originally to release his own work as Nightmare Lodge as well as other Italian electronic musicians. Minus Habens spawned a sister label, Disturbance, that focused on techno & ambient including Iusco's own IT project.
Mute Records	1978	(United Kingdom)	see Category:Mute Records artists (141)	Founded by Daniel Miller of The Normal.
Negative Gain Productions	1997	(United States)	Alter Der Ruine; Caustic; Haujobb; Kevorkian Death Cycle; Mr.Kitty	Currently run by Roger Jarvis (of KDC and HexRx) and Micah Skaritka (of Cruciform Injection); also publishes NGP Magazine.
Nettwerk	1984	(Canada)	Chris & Cosey; Consolidated; Download; Moev; Severed Heads; Single Gun Theory; Skinny Puppy; The Tear Garden	Originally created by Nettwerk principals Terry McBride, Mark Jowett, Ric Arboit and Dan Fraser, as a record label to distribute recordings by the band Moev, but the label expanded in Canada and internationally. Initially specializing in electronic music genres such as alternative dance and industrial, the label turned towards pop and rock in the late 1980s and 1990s.
New European Recordings	1981	(United Kingdom)	Death In June; In the Nursery	Began as Death In June's personal self-produced label. In the 1980s' NER was distributed by Rough Trade UK, in 1990s' by World Serpent Distribution. Due to legal problems between Death In June and WSD, in 2000 the distributor then became Tesco Organisation, Germany which ended 7 years later. Since 2007 the official Worldwide distributors of the NER catalogue are Soleilmoon in America and NEROZ II in Australia.
Neurot Recordings	1999	(United States)	FINAL; KK Null; Savage Republic	Founded by members of avant-garde metal band Neurosis.
Nextera	1989	(Czech Republic)	Clock DVA; The Hafler Trio; Lustmord	Czech record label founded by Kristian Kotarac.
Nilaihah Records	1999	(United States)	Ad Inferna; The Azoic; Interface; Null Device; Oneiroid Psychosis; XP8	Founded by Kristy Venrick of The Azoic, after Oneiroid Psychosis asked her to release their next album. Though she did not have a record label at the time, Oneiroid Psychosis was impressed by Kristy's success at promoting her own band. After considering the proposal, a year later, Kristy agreed and decided to begin Nilaihah Records.
Nothing Records	1992	(United States)	see Nothing Records discography	Founded by John Malm Jr. and Trent Reznor as a sub-label of Interscope Records.
Nova Zembla	1993	(Belgium)	Black Lung; Xingu Hill	Sub-label of KK Records.
Off Beat	1993	(Germany)	see Category:Off Beat label artists (16)	Founded by Stefan Herwig and Thorsten Stroht after Stefan closed Kugelblitz Records. Sublabel of WestCom along with sister labels Visage (synthpop), Poison Ivy (goth rock), and Nightshade Productions (dark wave). In 1999 Stefan Herwig, A&R manager at Off Beat, left the company over differences in promotion to form the Dependent label, taking many of Off Beat's acts with him and effectively shutting down Off Beat & Westcom.
Old Europa Cafe	1983	(Italy)	Autopsia; Deutsch Nepal; Merzbow; The Haters	Founded by Rodolfo Protti, originally as a small cassette label.
Opción Sónica	1991	(Mexico)	Bostich; Cenobita; Hocico; Ordo Equitum Solis	Mexican label and distributor with a heavy emphasis on electronic music during the 90s.
Out of Line Music	1995	(Germany)	And One; Ashbury Heights; Blutengel; Combichrist; Hocico; Klinik; Rabia Sorda; Signal Aout 42; Suicide Commando	Founded as a mail order company, later expanded to Miami and Las Vegas with distribution through Rough Trade.
Pendragon Records	1994	(United States)	Gridlock; Haujobb; Imperative Reaction; Velvet Acid Christ; Xorcist	Founded by Irish expatriate Colm O'Connor. The label was bought out by Metropolis Records in 1999 shortly after it released Halo_Gen's self-titled album. When Metropolis Records bought Pendragon, they continued to sell Pendragon's backstock.
Pharmafabrik	1993	(Slovenia)	Asmus Tietchens; Daniel Buess; Nordvargr	
Positron! Records	1998	(United States)	Beautiful Assassins; Sister Machine Gun	Founded by Chris Randall, frontman of the industrial band Sister Machine Gun.
Play It Again Sam	1983	(Belgium)	à;GRUMH...; Poésie Noire; Siglo XX; The Neon Judgement; The Legendary Pink Dots	Founded in Belgium by Kenny Gates and Michel Lambot.
Prototyp	2001	(Sweden)	Colony 5; Pouppée Fabrikk; Pride and Fall	A sublabel formed out of Memento Materia focusing on EBM, industrial and harder electro.
Ras Dva	1994	(United States)	Benestrophe; Kevorkian Death Cycle; Leæther Strip	Founded by Ric Laciak, a disc jockey for WMSE in Milwaukee and writer for Industrial Nation magazine. It was originally started as "GAWMUS," a fan club for members of the band Leæther Strip. In 1995, Ras Dva released There Is No Time, a comprehensive 4-CD compilation of the European and American industrial music scenes.
Red Rhino Europe (RRE)	1982	(Belgium)	Front 242	European subsidiary of the UK-based Red Rhino Records that served as Front 242's European label during the 1980s and 90s. RRE was acquired by Play It Again Sam after the financial collapse of its parent company in 1988.
Re-Constriction Records	1991	(United States)	see Category:Re-Constriction Records artists (20)	A division of Cargo Music based in California. The label was founded in 1991 and headed by Chase, who was previously the music director at KCR, a student radio station on the campus of San Diego State University.
Relapse Records	1990	(United States)	see Category:Relapse Records artists (121)	Formed by Matthew F. Jacobson in Aurora, Colorado.
ROIR	1979	(United States)	Einstürzende Neubauten; Front Line Assembly; The Legendary Pink Dots	Reachout International Records, founded by Neil Cooper initially as a cassette-only label.
Rotorelief	2005	(France)	CoH; Die Form; Nurse With Wound; Maurizio Bianchi	
Season of Mist	1996	(France)	Genitorturers; Punish Yourself	Metal and industrial metal label founded by Michael S. Berberian that also distributes other major industrial labels within France.
Sector 9 Studios	2002	(United States)	Negative Format; God Module	Founded by Alex Matheu out of dissatisfaction with labels he worked with as Negative Format.
Simbiose Records	1992	(Portugal)	Aenima; Bizarra Locomotiva; Mentallo and the Fixer; Swamp Terrorists	Later renamed to Symbiose Records
Soleilmoon Recordings	1987	(United States)	see Category:Soleilmoon artists (38)	Began as a cassette label operating from the back of a record shop called the Ooze in Portland, Oregon, US. In 1991 the shop was sold and Soleilmoon became a full-time label.
Some Bizzare	1981	(United Kingdom)	see Category:Some Bizzare Records artists (27)	Founded by Stevo Pearce.
Sordide Sentimental	1978	(France)	Monte Cazazza; Psychic TV; Savage Republic; Throbbing Gristle	Founded by Jean-Pierre Turmel and Yves Von Bontee.
Sound of Pig	1984	(United States)	If, Bwana; Minóy; Morphogenesis; Psyclones	A cassette culture label started in the early 1980s by Al Margolis in New York City.
Staalplaat	1982	(Netherlands)	Asmus Tietchens; Autopsia; Deutsch Nepal; Edward Ka-Spel; Hafler Trio; Laibach; Lustmord; Muslimgauze; Rapoon; Z'EV; Zoviet France	Founded by Geert-Jan Hobijn and is famous for its Mort Aux Vaches series, which is a collaboration between Staalplaat and the national Dutch radio VPRO, in which the station provides the recording sessions and Staalplaat releases them in a limited edition.
Steelwork Maschine	2003	(France)	Westwind	Founded in 2003 by Christophe Gales and Serge Usson after the demise of Gales' previous CD-R label Black Sun Rising. Steelwork Maschine also started a mail-order store on internet in 2004.
Sterile Records	1979	(United Kingdom)	Bourbonese Qualk; Controlled Bleeding; Konstruktivits; Maurizio Bianchi; Nocturnal Emissions; SPK	Founded by Nigel Ayers and Caroline K of the post-industrial music group Nocturnal Emissions. Caroline K left the label in 1983. In 1986 the label was effectively dissolved as Ayers turned his attention to setting up the Earthly Delights company.
Subconscious Communications	1993	(United States)	Doubting Thomas; cEvin Key; Download; Hilt; Otto von Schirach; PlatEAU; Skinny Puppy; The Tear Garden	Founded by Dwayne Goettel of Skinny Puppy and Phil Western of Download. The label has been described as a "record label, musician collective, remix team, 32-track digital studio, [and an] analogue synth museum."
Subterranean Records	1979	(United States)	Chrome; Controlled Bleeding; Factrix; Minimal Man; Monte Cazazza; Psyclones; Z'EV	Founded by Steve Tupper and a then partner, Michael Fox, in San Francisco. Subterranean had a small storefront record shop on Valencia Street for about 4 years, from about 1984 to 1988.
Synthetic Sounds	2006	(Canada)	iVardensphere; Left Spine Down; The Rabid Whole	Record label founded by concert promotion and music management/booking company Synthetic Entertainment. Distributed by Canadian company Sonic Unyon.
Synthetic Symphony	1993	(Germany)	And One; Camouflage; Chandeen; Covenant; Dance or Die; Die Krupps; Electro Assassin; Funker Vogt; Melotron; Psyche; Skinny Puppy; Velvet Acid Christ; Welle:Erdball	A division of SPV GmbH
Techno Drome International	1987	(Germany)	Bigod 20	Founded by Andreas Tomalla (a.k.a. Talla 2XLC). The label's first records appeared under the tagline 'Aggrepo', which is a syllabic abbreviation of aggressive / positive – a German-based alternative term for Electronic Body Music. Tomalla left the label in 1989 to found Zoth Ommog and New Zone, after which TDI turned towards a house & techno sound.
Temple Records	1984	(United Kingdom)	Psychic TV; Zos Kia	Founded by Genesis P-Orridge and Psychic TV from 1984 through 1994 for releases by Psychic TV and related projects. TOPYUS was the related sublabel for releases inside the United States of America. In 2003, the label was resurrected as a part of the Voiceprint label group.
T.E.Q. Music?	1993	(United Kingdom)	Portion Control; Solar Enemy; Arthur Loves Plastic; Vanishing Heat	Music label off-shoot of "Music from the Empty Quarter", a magazine covering industrial and experimental music that was published from 1991 to 1996.
Tesco Organisation	1987	(Germany)	Anenzephalia; Post Scriptvm; Throbbing Gristle; Trepaneringsritualen; Vromb	Founded by Joachim Kohl and Klaus Hilger, Tesco Organisation started as a mail order company in 1987. In 1989 the label released their first album and shortly after this release Tesco expanded and created a sub-label, Functional, primarily for the re-release of unknown cassette recordings.
Third Mind Records	1983	(United Kingdom)	see Category:Third Mind Records artists (26)	Founded in February 1983 by Gary Levermore.
Trisol Music Group	2000	(Germany)	Cenobita; Die Form; Project Pitchfork; Rotersand; XPQ-21	Umbrella company for a number of sub labels covering various styles of dark alternative music.
Triton	1998	(Germany)	Camerata Mediolanense; Dive; Kirlian Camera; Vomito Negro	Began where Discordia left off.
Tursa	1990	(United Kingdom)	Sol Invictus; Tor Lundvall	Founded by Tony Wakeford and distributed by World Serpent Distribution.
TVT Records	1984	(United States)	see Category:TVT Records artists (81)	TVT Records (Tee-Vee Tunes) was an American record label founded by Steve Gottlieb. In 1992, TVT purchased the Chicago-based industrial music label Wax Trax! Records. In 2007, TVT filed for bankruptcy and in 2010 much of the label's back catalog was acquired by The Bicycle Music Company.
Tympanik Audio	2007	(United States)	Ad·ver·sary; Black Lung; Haujobb; Stendeck	Chicago-based electronic music label.
Tzadik Records	1995	(United States)	see Category:Tzadik_Records_artists (136)	New York City label that specializes in avant-garde and experimental music; established by composer and saxophonist John Zorn.
Underground, Inc.	2000	(United States)	see Category:Underground, Inc. artists (29)	A Chicago-based subsidiary of Invisible Records distributed by Caroline Distribution.
United Dairies	1979	(United Kingdom)	Asmus Tietchens; Current 93; Nurse With Wound	Formed by Nurse With Wound to distribute their own releases but later expanded. Distributed by World Serpent Distribution until 2003, and by Jnana Records thereafter.
Van Richter	1993	(United States)	Girls Under Glass	Founded in California by Paul Van Richter (né Abramson). In 1999, the label made an early entry into the ecommerce space by launching its own online retail store, Muzik Non-Stop, which offered CD retail and downloadable music in Liquid Audio format. At various points has been distributed by Fontana Distribution, Navarre Corporation, and Ryko Distribution Partners.
Vinyl on Demand	2003	(Germany)	Asmus Tietchens; Current 93; Die Tödliche Doris; John Duncan; The Legendary Pink Dots; Merzbow; Nurse With Wound; Psychic TV; SPK	Founded by Frank Maier with the purpose of re-releasing on vinyl many of the limited edition cassettes in Frank's collection, but as time passed the reissues became deluxe box sets with material from cassettes as well as unreleased material. Vinyl On Demand sold yearly subscriptions to collectors, often providing extras exclusively for subscribers.
VUZ Records	1993	(Germany)	Absolute Body Control; Advanced Art; Psyche; Wumpscut	Founded by Hoger Hanraths out of his mail order service that originated in the tape scene of the 1980s. VUZ spawned a boutique sub-label, Cats' Heaven, that dealt in more of an industrial-inspired dark ambient and trance direction.
Wax Trax! Records	1980	(United States)	see Category:Wax Trax! Records artists (48)	Label began by Jim Nash & Dannie Flesher at the beginning of the 1980s named after the record store that the pair originally established in Denver, Colorado. The label was in operation until 1992 when it was purchased by TVT Records.
WTII Records	2001	(United States)	Acumen Nation; In Strict Confidence; Klutæ; Sister Machine Gun; SMP	Founded by former Wax Trax! Records employee Bart Pfanenstiel and David Schock. Distributed worldwide by MVD (Music and Video Distribution) former distributors include NAIL Distribution a Division of the Allegro Media Group and Planetworks Entertainment.
York House Recordings	1979	(United Kingdom)	Asmus Tietchens; Maurizio Bianchi	A cassette label founded by David Elliott, who also published a magazine called Neumusik.
Zoth Ommog Records	1989	(Germany)	see Category:Zoth Ommog Records artists (29)	Established by German music producer Andreas Tomalla (aka Talla 2XLC) and later handed over to producer Torben Schmidt. Held under the umbrella of Music Research GmbH along with sister labels New Zone, Metamatic, and others.

== See also ==
- Lists of record labels
- List of industrial music bands
- Assimilate: A Critical History of Industrial Music

== Sources ==
- Reed, S. Alexander (2013). Assimilate: A Critical History of Industrial Music. New York: Oxford University Press. ISBN 9780199832583. OCLC 1147729910 – via the Internet Archive.
