= Arvika Festival =

Annual music festival in Sweden (1992–2010)

Coordinates: 59°38′58.85″N 12°37′12.07″E

Arvikafestivalen
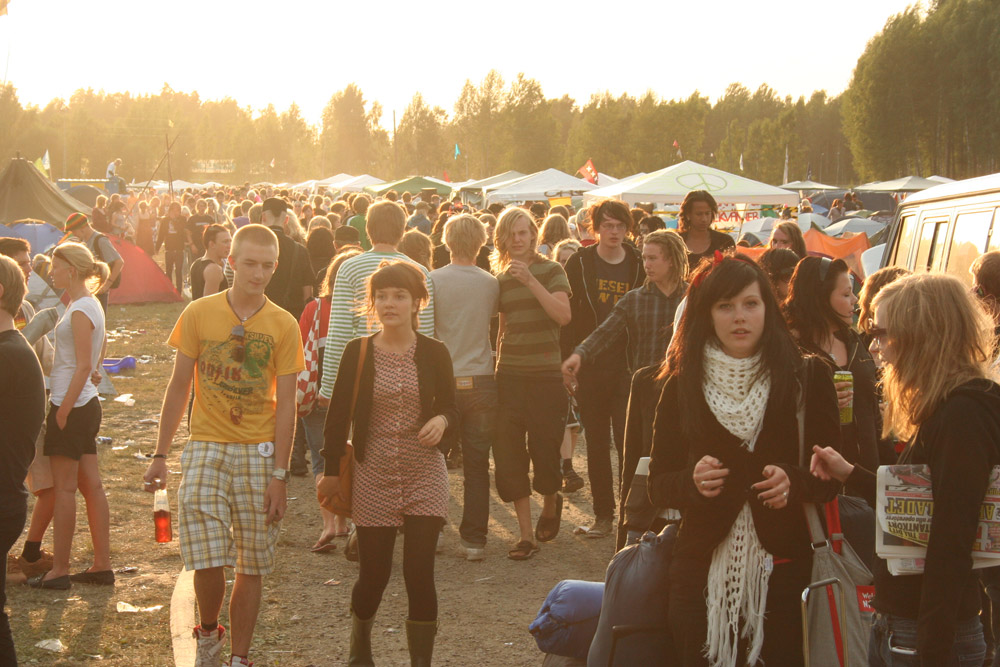
- Genre: Alternative rock, Pop, Electronic music, Metal
- Dates: Three days, first week of July (since 2008)
- Locations: Arvika, Sweden
- Years active: 1992 - 2010

Arvika Festival (Swedish: Arvikafestivalen) was an annual music festival held in Arvika, Sweden. It took place during three days in the middle of July, from Thursday to Saturday, with camping available from the beginning of the week. The non-profit association "Galaxen" (Swedish for "The Galaxy") arranged the festival.

Since the nineties, the festival had built up a tradition of booking many big synth bands. This was initially an unintended side effect: for the first festival in 1992 the arrangers had booked Cat Rapes Dog, Pouppée Fabrikk and S.P.O.C.K. and about 50% of the audience that showed up was actually mostly interested in these bands since no other festival booked many synth acts. However, along with the synth bands, internationally and nationally famous rock and pop acts visit the festival every year, attracting people not only interested in synth music.

In 2006, somewhere between 15000 and 16000 people visited the festival, breaking a new record in ticket sales, and confirming the festival's spot as one of the big ones in Sweden. In 2009 the total number of tickets sold were 22500 including all three-day and one-day passes.

Some of the most famous bands that have visited the festival include (in reverse chronological order):

- Depeche Mode, Nine Inch Nails (2009)
- Interpol, Slayer, Death Cab For Cutie (2008)
- Bloc Party, Infected Mushroom (2007)
- Franz Ferdinand (2006)
- New Order (2005)
- Kraftwerk (2004)
- Björk, HIM (2003)
- Soft Cell, The Cure, Primal Scream, Muse (2002)
- The Sisters Of Mercy, Gary Numan, Placebo (2001)
- Motörhead (1999)
- The Prodigy (1995)
- Tool, Karl Bartos as Elektric Music (1994)
- Einstürzende Neubauten, Die Krupps (1993)

In 2010 the lineup contained bands such as Babyshambles and Regina Spektor.
