= Scapa Flow (band) =

Swedish electronic music band

- Origin: Uppsala, Sweden
- Genres: Electronic body music, Industrial music
- Years active: 1988–1996
- Labels: Front Music Production; Energy
- Spinoffs: No Hotel
- Past members: Andreas Carlsson; Calle Sjöström; Johan Lavsund; Johan Nygren

Scapa Flow was a Swedish EBM band, formed in 1988, and was one of the icons of the new EBM and synth scene that emerged in Sweden in the late 80's. The band was named after Scapa Flow, a body of water in the Orkney Islands.

== History ==
Scapa Flow formed in May 1988 as a quartet of Andreas Carlsson, Johan Lavsund, Johan Nygren and Carl Sjöström. The band was one of several electronic music groups to emerge from Uppsala in the 1980s including Cultivated Bimbo, Inside Treatment, and Systema. Their first demo tape, The Core, was recorded that year. The band made contact with Swedish label Front Music Production, who selected the track "Servant" for their compilation release Trans Europa (A Swiss - Swedish Techno-Compilation). The band recorded a second demo cassette entitled Crucial Impact towards the end of the same year.

The band produced a third demo tape, Overflow, in 1989 and began to play live shows in Uppsala and Stockholm. After the entire pressing of Overflow sold out, Front Music Production approached the band about producing an LP. In November that year, The Guide was released.

In 1990, the band recorded two new songs — "Join the line" and "Creation" — to round out a CD release of The Guide. Lavsund left the band that year before they embarked on a national tour with fellow Swedish band, Inside Treatment. Work began later that year on material for their next album, Chased By Sunset, which brought on guest musicians Calle Nordlund and Jögge The Diamond. The release was delayed into 1991 due to the reorganization of Front Music Production into Energy Rekords. In the interim, Carlsson and Sjöström recorded a cover version of Depeche Mode's "To Have And To Hold" under the name No Hotel for release on the Energy Rekords compilation, I Sometimes Wish I Was Famous - A Swedish Tribute To Depeche Mode.

After the release of Chased By Sunset in August 1991, the band toured Germany with Pouppée Fabrikk. After returning from the tour the band played a last concert in Stockholm before essentially going dormant for a number of years. By the end of 1993 the band had recorded enough tracks to compile their last studio album, Heads Off To Freedom, which was released in 1994. The band played several more shows during 1994 and 1995 before again going dormant.

Despite drifting apart, the band managed to produce several new tracks, some of which emerged on their 2002 compilation release Pax Vobiscum 1988-2001. The band reunited in November 2014 to play the Progress festival in Gothenburg, Germany. In 2018, Swedish label Progress Productions remastered and re-released the band's first demo, The Core, as a limited edition CD.

== Discography ==
- The Core - Demo 0788 (Cass demo) 1988 • (CD album) 2018 – Progress Productions
- Crucial Impact (Cass demo) 1989
- Overflow (Cass demo) 1989
- The Guide (LP album) 1989 – Front Music Production • (LP/CD album) 1991 – Parade Amoureuse
- Chased By Sunset (LP/CD album) 1991 – Energy Rekords
- Heads Off To Freedom (CD album) 1994 – Energy Rekords
- Pax Vobiscum 1988-2001 (CD compilation) 2002 – Energy Rekords
