= Vomito negro =

Vomito negro may refer to:

- An alternative name for the acute viral disease yellow fever
- A Belgian band, see Vomito Negro (band)
