= XPQ-21 =

German electronic band

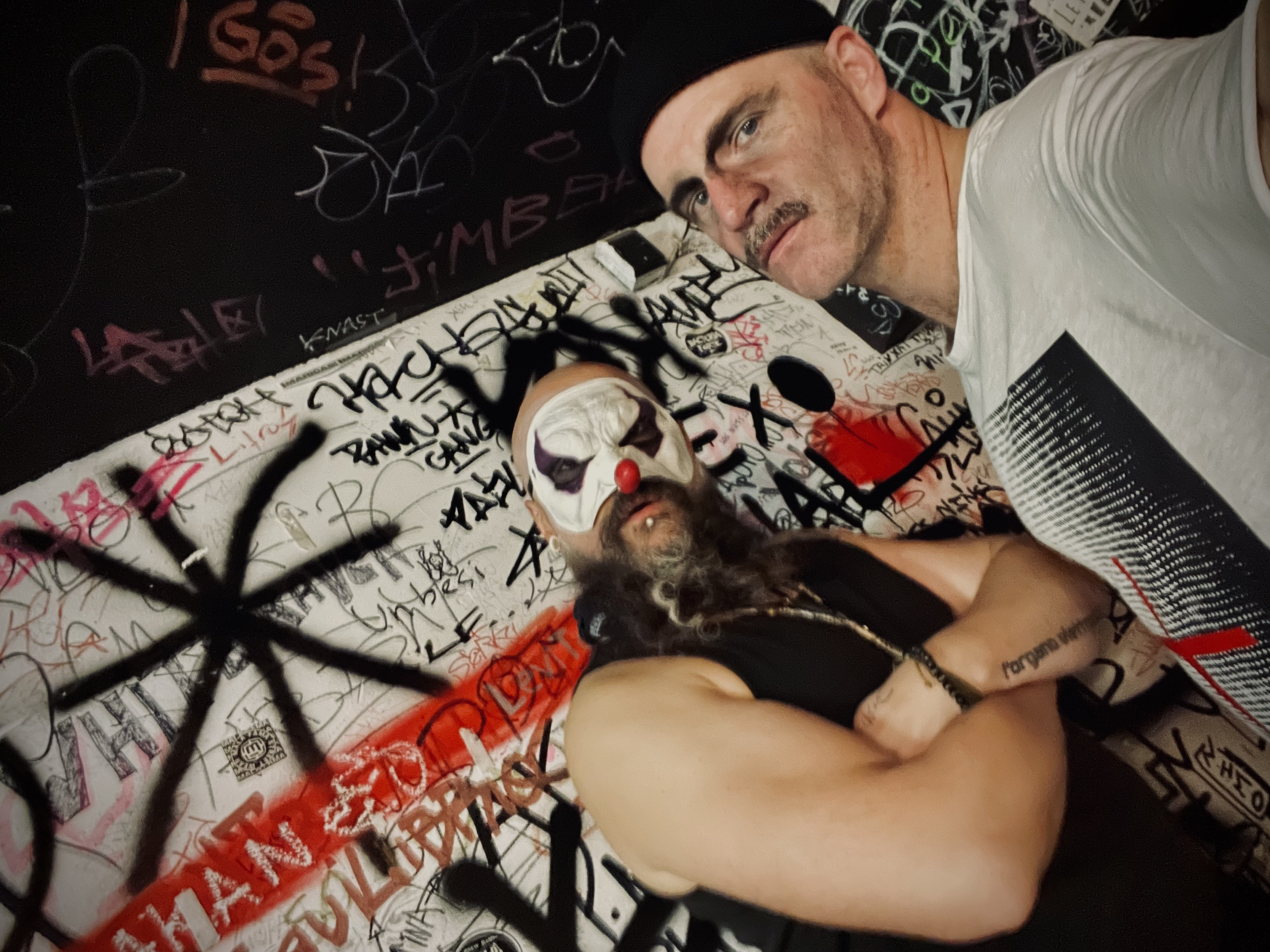
- XPQ-21 in 2022

Background information
- Origin: Germany
- Genres: Electronic Music, EBM, Cyberpunk, Industrial, Alternative Rock, Dubstep, Drum and Bass, Breaks
- Years active: 1998–present
- Labels: Fourbiddentones; Bloodline; Dying Culture; Trisol; Monsters & Heroes
- Members: Jeyênne; Andy Haywire
- Past members: Nicque; Annelie Bertilsson; Hitch; Sascha Kepper; Claudia Lippmann; Martin Hillebrand; Alex Gsell; Moritz Zielke
- Website: www.xpq-21.com

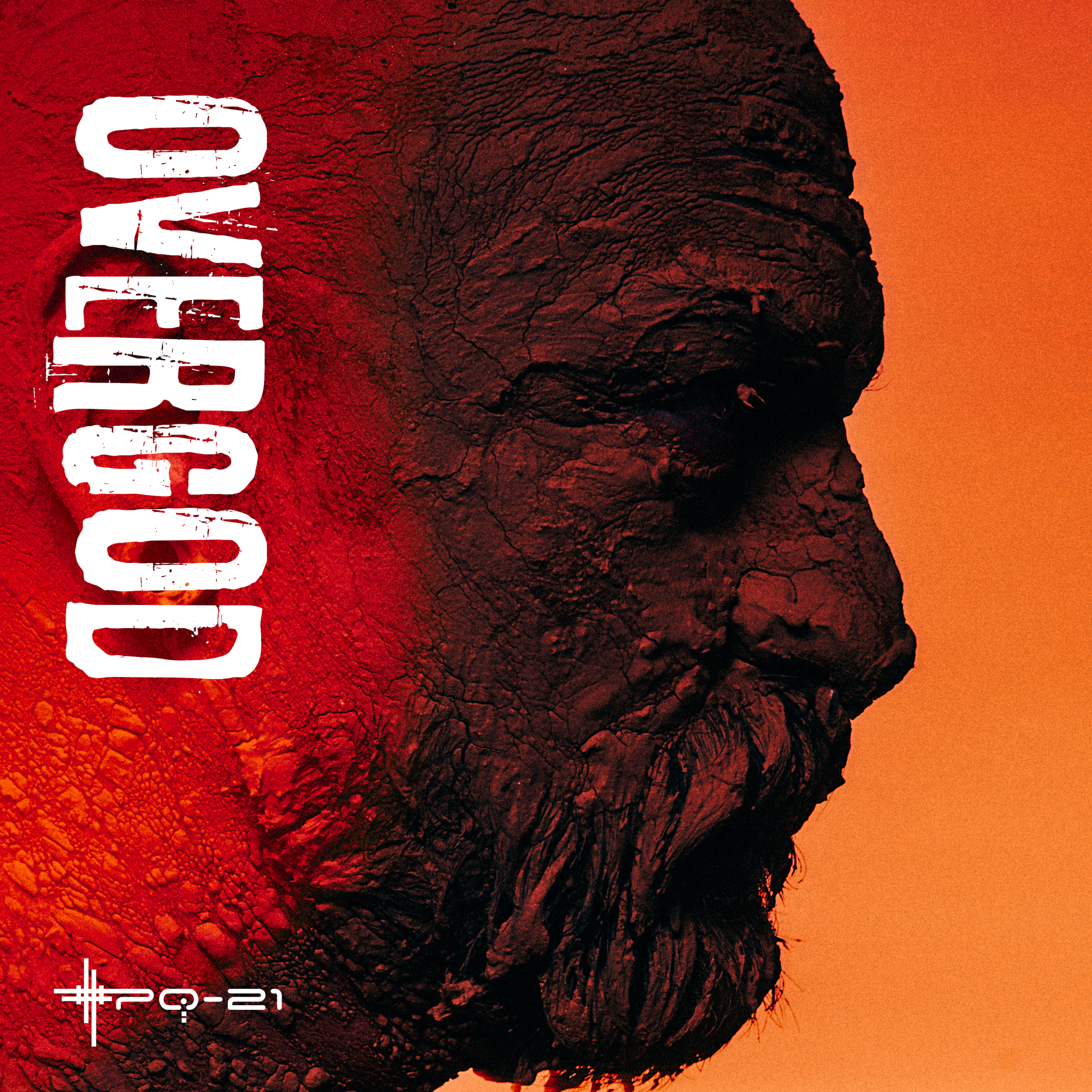

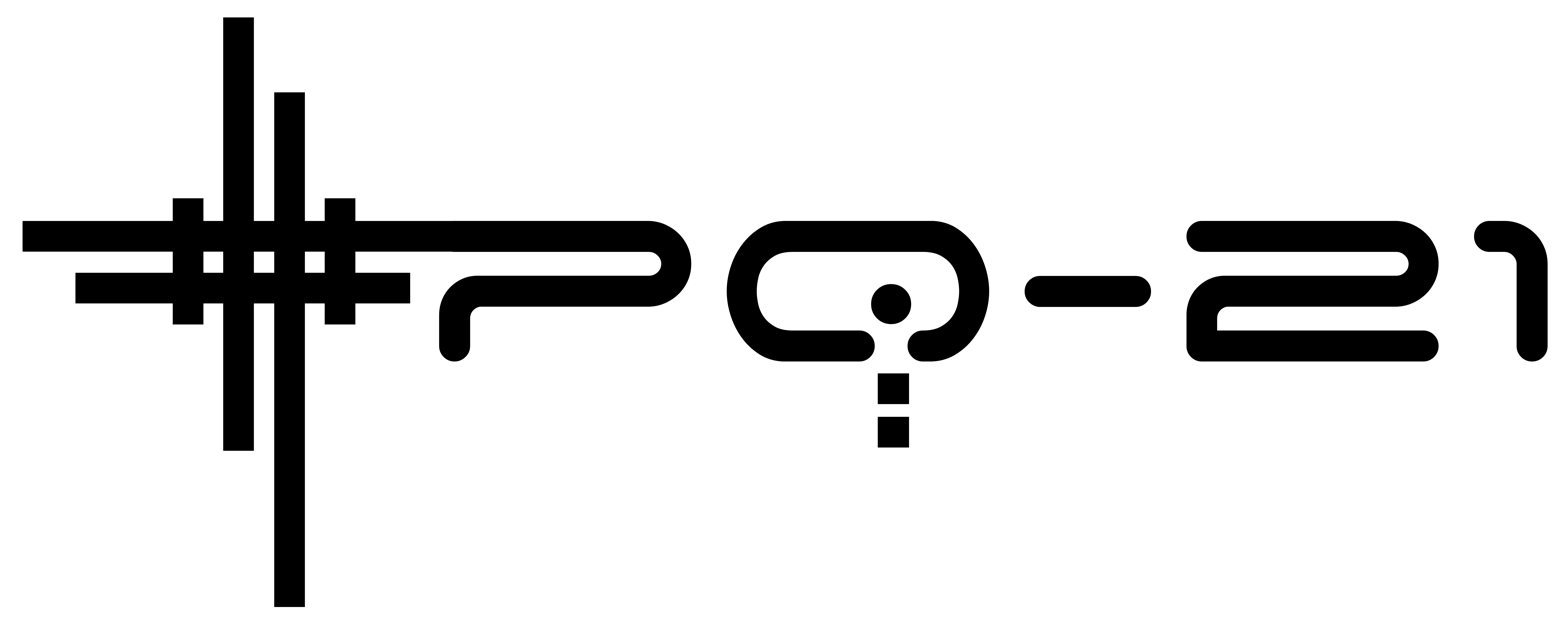

XPQ-21 are a German electronic body music band, led by Jeyênne. They are best known for their hits "White And Alive", "Rockin' Silver Knight" and "Dead Body".

== History ==
XPQ-21 was formed as a duo in 1998, consisting of Jeyênne and Nicque. They released their first single A Gothic Novel in 1998 and their album Destroy To Create in 1999.

Following Nicque leaving XPQ-21 in 2003, Jeyênne was joined by various new members. Live members have included Annelie Bertilsson (Cat Rapes Dog, And One), Martin Hillebrand, Moritz Zielke and Andy Haywire.

XPQ-21 returned in 2022 with the new single Machines on Monsters & Heroes, their own label. In April 2022 Machines reached No. 2 in the Deutsche Alternative Charts (DAC) (German Alternative Charts). Their next single Temptation reached No. 1 in January 2023.

2024 XPQ-21 releases the last single of the trilogy, "Where Minds Collide", featuring Laura Friedland, a jazz singer with Jewish-Ukrainian roots, based in Germany.

The album originally planned for 2023 was first postponed to summer 2024 – and finally released in autumn 2025. On October 31st, 2025, “OVERGOD” was released with a total of 17 tracks.

== Instruments ==
Jeyênne combines analogue synthesizers (Korg Monopoly, Roland 909, 808, 101, Roland TB 303) with digital gear and sequencing on Apple Macintosh, typically working in Logic Pro, now Ableton Live. He also works with software from native instruments, soundtoys, fabfilters, audiorealism, intelligent sounds and music, vital, u-he, valhalla and D16.

== Related activities ==
Jeyênne has run the EMS - Electronic Music School in Cologne since 2010 and Berlin since 2011. The XPQ-21 studio is also located in the school's building in Berlin.

== Name ==
The name "XPQ-21" was originally the title of a song, as "a combination of letters that mean a lot to me ... it was the first hit/club hit, and later we thought: 'Okay, let's make it a band name.'"

== Discography ==
=== Albums ===
- Destroy To Create (CD, Fourbiddentones FBT-002-CD, 1999)
- Belle Epoque (CD, Bloodline LINECD-012, October 2000)
- Chi (CD, Dying Culture CULT006-2, 22 August 2002)
- Alive (CD, Trisol TRI-261-CD, 24 March 2006)
  - "Rockin' Silver Night" DAC 7 weeks, peak no. 9; no. 88 for 2006
  - "Dead Body" DAC 6 weeks, peak no. 10; no. 97 for 2006
- Overgod (Streaming, Download, Monsters & Heroes MAH004, 31. October 2025)

=== Singles ===
- "A Gothic Novel (Science Fiction)" (9:30) / "A Gothic Novel (Body Version)" (6:04) // "Pornography (FuckU)" (5:09) / "Pornography (Cy's Version)" (6:24) (12", Fourbiddentones FBT-001, September 1998; CD, Bloodline LINECD-026, August 2000)
- "Hey You (Edit)" (4:00) / "Hey You (Nicque's Version)" (7:34) / "Hey You (Belle Version)" (6:14) / "Ghost" (7:08) / "Another Playground" (6:33) / "Sequencial" (6:57) (CD, Bloodline LINECD-053, April 2001)
- "White and Alive (Club Version)" (5:43) / "White and Alive (Wollschläger Remix)" (7:41) / "White and Alive (S.P.O.C.K Remix)" (6:54) / "Israel" (9:38) / "White and Alive (Original Version)" (5:12) (CD, Dying Culture CULT004-5, 12 July 2002)
  - DAC 8 weeks, peak No. 4; No. 32 for 2002
- "Machines - Original" (4.10) / "Machines - Club Version" (5:48) DAC 5 weeks, peak No. 2;
- "Temptation - Original" (4.53) / DAC peak No. 1;
- "Where Minds Collide (feat. Laura Friedland)" (4.53) / DAC peak No. 4;
- "Dance The Devil" (3.37);

=== Compilation appearances ===
- "Monster" (5:52) on Electronic Lust V.1 (2×CD, Orkus EFA-61606-02, 1998)
