= Camerata Mediolanense =

Background information
- Origin: Milan, Italy
- Genres: Neoclassical Dark Wave; Martial Industrial
- Years active: 1994–present
- Labels: Prophecy; My Castle; Triton
- Website: https://www.cameratamediolanense.it

Camerata Mediolanense is an ensemble of musicians established in Milan, Italy in 1994. Their music can be classified as darkwave/neoclassical, with folk elements.

The head of the project is Elena Previdi, a diplomated classical composer; the other members come from different training and musical experiences: percussionist and singer Trevor and percussionist Manuel Aroldi come from the post-punk scene, while former lead singer Daniela Bedeski has a past in folk music.

Camerata Mediolanense literally means "group of chamber musicians from Milan" ("Mediolanense" means "from Mediolanum", the Ancient Roman name for Milan). Their music is composed according to the traditions and history of Italy and Europe's classical and folk music, using martial percussion, sublime voices, keyboards, and electronic devices.

The band was in 2008 attacked by a far-left commando in a bar of Fribourg. Camerata file a complaint.

== Discography ==
=== Full-length albums ===
- Musica Reservata (CD, October 18, 1994, My Castle Rec.; second printing by Discordia; remastered ane re-issued in 2002 by My Castle; re-issued in 2013 by Prophecy).
- Campo di Marte (CD, November, 1996, Discordia/Triton; re-issued by My Castle; re-issued in 2013 by Prophecy).
- Madrigali – De Diversi Et Excellentissimi Musici (CD/LP, 1999, Triton; re-issued by My Castle; re-issued in 2013 by Prophecy).
- Vertute, Honor, Bellezza (CD, June 7, 2013, Prophecy).
- Le Vergini Folli (CD, 2017, Prophecy)
- Atalanta Fugiens (CD, 2024, Prophecy)

=== EPs and Singles ===
- Amor, Ch'a Nullo Amato Amar Perdona / Vuolsi Così Colà Dove Si Puote (Inferno I) (7", October 1997, My Castle).
- Francesca, I Tuoi Martiri / La Prima Di Color Di Cui Novelle (Inferno II) (7", May 1999, My Castle).
- L'Alfiere (10", split with Pavor Nocturnus, 2001, Eis und Licht).
- 29 Luglio MM – Lago Di Varese (7" Live, split with Les Joyaux de la Princesse, 2001).
- Nessun Maggior Dolore / Noi Leggiavamo (Inferno III) (7", 2008, My Castle).
- 99 Altri Perfecti (CD, 2011, My Castle).
- Vergine Bella (CD, 2013, Prophecy).

=== Other Releases ===
- ΠANKPATION (CD Compilation, 2006, Twilight Records).
- MDXXX (CD Live, 2010, Creative Fields Rec.).
