= Blackhouse (band) =

Christian industrial band

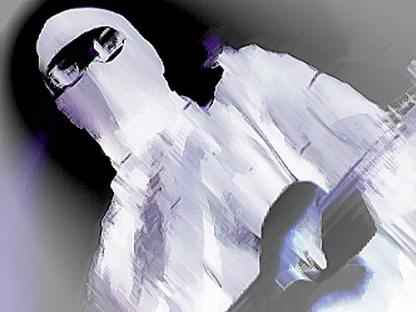
- Promotional image of Brian Ladd, the sole member of Blackhouse

Background information
- Origin: Eureka, California
- Genres: Industrial, experimental, noise, avant-garde music, dark ambient, power electronics
- Years active: 1984–present
- Labels: Ladd-Frith; RRRecords; Staalplaat; Discordia; Blacklight; Nowhere Arts; Dark Vinyl; Steinklang Industries
- Members: Brian Ladd
- Website: https://blackhouse.bandcamp.com/

Blackhouse is a Christian industrial project helmed by Brian Ladd and based in Eureka, California. Blackhouse plays what has been cited as "primo industrial rock", contrasting with industrial rock styles promulgated by artists such as NIN, Klank, or Circle of Dust. Blackhouse was formed in 1984 and is cited as the first band to make industrial music for the Christian market.

== Background ==
Known and sometimes cited as being a founding band of the genre, Blackhouse has been active for over three decades, and the band has produced multiple releases in that time. The band finds itself between artistic expression and forming a message in a way that could be accepted in the broad Christian community. One album featured a cover showing a rabbit crucified, with the thought of exposing the real meaning of Easter.

The sound that Blackhouse offered was far outside the norms of Christian music at the time of the band's formation, and live performances met with resistance from both the Christian right and Neo-Nazi youth organizations. The Neo-Nazi groups protested the religious content, which was unusual in a genre more known for espousing negative themes including nihilism, pornography, sadomasochism, and drug culture, and the Christians took point with the style that the band offered, again due to its association with negative elements of society. After a time the band went underground, focusing on producing recorded material rather than touring.

A review of their 2006 collaborative project Beetu Lathri Kwan found that their genre-mixing produced what was deemed an "intentional dissolution of traditional concepts of... music." The music's effect on the reviewers has shown a great variety of responses. One reviewer reported that the sound finds the "border of our conscious and unconscious thinking", while others have insisted that the sound is "barely good for background noise" or "more frustrating than enjoyable". Lyrics are generally noted as being few and far between, but containing positive messages and espousing Christian faith.

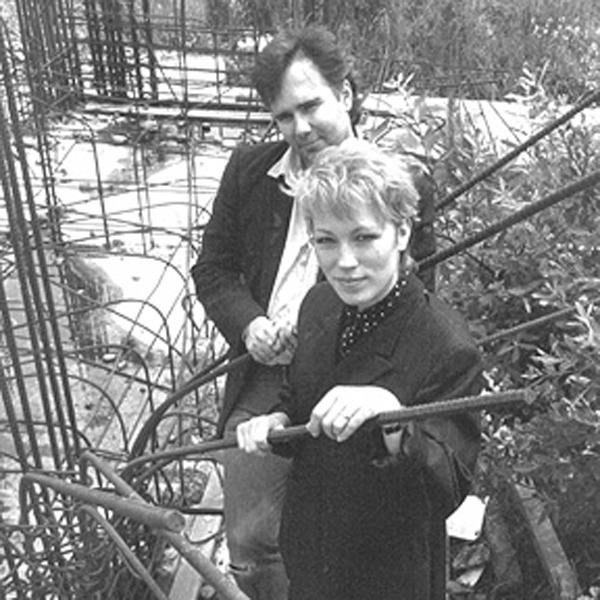
Psyclones

Brian Ladd was a member of Psyclones, an experimental industrial band started in 1980 with bass guitarist Julie Frith, drummer Po (Robert) Poston, and rhythm guitarist Dale Cairnes. Psyclones are a long-standing band with a diverse sound, ranging from punk/post-rock/synth-pop to electronic industrial/ambient music. They released their Greatest Hits (1981–1991) CD which spans over a decade of their career. Sounds range from hardcore punk/grunge/rock to industrial-core noise rock. Most of the tracks are very dance worthy. The overall sound is heavy and harsh, "musical mayhem." Psyclones also put out many lps and singles on other their own label Ladd-Frith. They performance at Club Foot, a small San Francisco underground club. The show was industrial improvisational.

== Members ==
Brian Ladd is the sole permanent member of Blackhouse. Early releases were credited to Ivo Cutler and Sterling Cross. Ladd has explained this was because "I always thought of Blackhouse as being SUPERMAN and I was merely a Clark Kent".

== Discography ==
=== Studio albums ===
- Pro-Life (1984)
- Hope Like A Candle (1985)
- Five Minutes After I Die (1986)
- Holy War (1987)
- We Will Fight Back! (1988)
- Stairway To Heaven (1989)
- The Father, The Son, And The Holy Ghost (1990)
- Material World (1990)
- Hidden Beneath The Metal (1991)
- Stairway To A Gospel World (1994)
- Shock The Nation! (1995)
- Shades Of Black (1998)
- Lawnmowerman (1998)
- Sex Sex Sex (1999)
- Dreams Like These (2000)
- Heart Of Black (2002)
- Yuen (2015)
- Ignite Blackhouse Youth (2016)
- X Communicator (2023)

=== Compilation albums ===
- Dribbles (2005)
- 25th Years Anniversary + Hope (2010)
- Beyond The Gates Of Good & Evil (2012)
- One Man's Collection (2019)

=== Video albums ===
- Thirty In 30 (2012)

=== Split albums ===
- Ice Skin / The Gospel According To The Men In Black (1991, split with Nightmare Lodge)
- Comin' On Strong (2011, split with Hypnoskull)
- Sacrificium Messiae (2016, split with Maurizio Bianchi)

=== Singles ===
- "Reason For The Season" 7" (1997)
- "y2k / Millennium" 7" (1999)
- "Material World" Video CD-R (2005)
- "Robots" 7" Picture Disc (2018)
