= Code 64 =

Swedish electronic music band

- Origin: Lysekil, Sweden
- Genres: Electropop; Futurepop; EBM
- Years active: 2000–2013. 2020-
- Labels: Angel Productions, Memento Materia, A Different Drum, Progress Productions, Arrowland MG
- Members: Henrik Piehl, Christian Espeland,
- Past members: Bjørn Marius Borg, Hasse Mattsson,
- Website: https://www.code64.se/

Code 64 is an electronic music band from Sweden. Their music can best be described as a mixture of synthpop, electronic body music and electropop.

== Biography ==
Code 64 is a synthpop, darkwave, electronica band that signed with the small Norwegian record label, "Angel Productions" only three years after establishing themselves as a group. They released their first album Storm in 2003, which contained nine original tracks. The album quickly sold out and Code 64 began to establish a fan base across Europe. Music reviews were generally positive, deeming it "very listenable, dynamic and easily accessible [sic] album." Release Magazine likened them to VNV Nation "in their most melodic mood."

Following this release they continued to work, releasing Departure in 2005 under the new label Memento Materia, who has released albums for many other well known technopop acts including the well known Swedish act Covenant. Departure was received incredibly well by critics within the genre, with Release Magazine stating that it has "genre-breaking potential" with Code 64 demonstrating "fantastic programming, refined melodies, classy varied vocals and enough punch and edge to light up the universe." Other reviews again reaffirmed Code 64's capabilities within the genre.

Code 64's sophomore album saw U.S. distribution for North America in 2005, when the band signed a multi release licensing deal with A Different Drum; the world's largest synthpop label as the time. Departure was re-released as a 2 C.D. Limited Edition with the bonus disc Sea of Stars single; featuring remixes and an exclusive b-side. This release is limited to only 500 copies worldwide.

Shortly after the release, Henrik Piehl left the band due to musical disagreements. On July 29, 2008, a new website was built and the addition of a new lead singer, Bjørn Marius Borg, was announced. Code 64 released their third studio album, Trialogue, on September 8, 2010. The second single from the Trialogue album, "Masquerade" was released on September 15, 2010. "Deviant" was released as a third digital single on August 16, 2011.

On July 23, 2013, Code 64 announced that Christian had left to spend more time with family, disbanding the group. Hasse and Bjørn reemerged as duo Xenturion Prime

On April 18, 2020, Code 64 announced via posts on Facebook that new music was being worked on. It was made apparent that Henrik Piehl and Christian Espeland would again be working on the project together.

On December 23, 2021, a new single entitled "Soundwave" was released.

Code 64's new album "Broken Rhythm" was released on November 18, 2022.

== Discography ==
=== Studio albums ===
- Storm (2003)
- Departure (2006)
- Trialogue (2010)
- Bits and pieces (2018)
- Broken Rhythm (2022)
- In Search of Mysteries (2024) (EP)

=== Singles ===
- Leaving Earth (2005)
- Sea of Stars (2006)
- Stasis (2010)
- Masquerade (2010)
- Deviant (2011)
- Accelerate (2013)
- Soundwave (2021)
- The Void (2022)
- Deceiver (2022)
- Walk On (2023)
- The Shape (2024)
- Trapdoor (2024)
- Protection Reformed (2024)

=== Demos ===
- Demo (2002)
