= Kevorkian Death Cycle =

American electro-industrial band

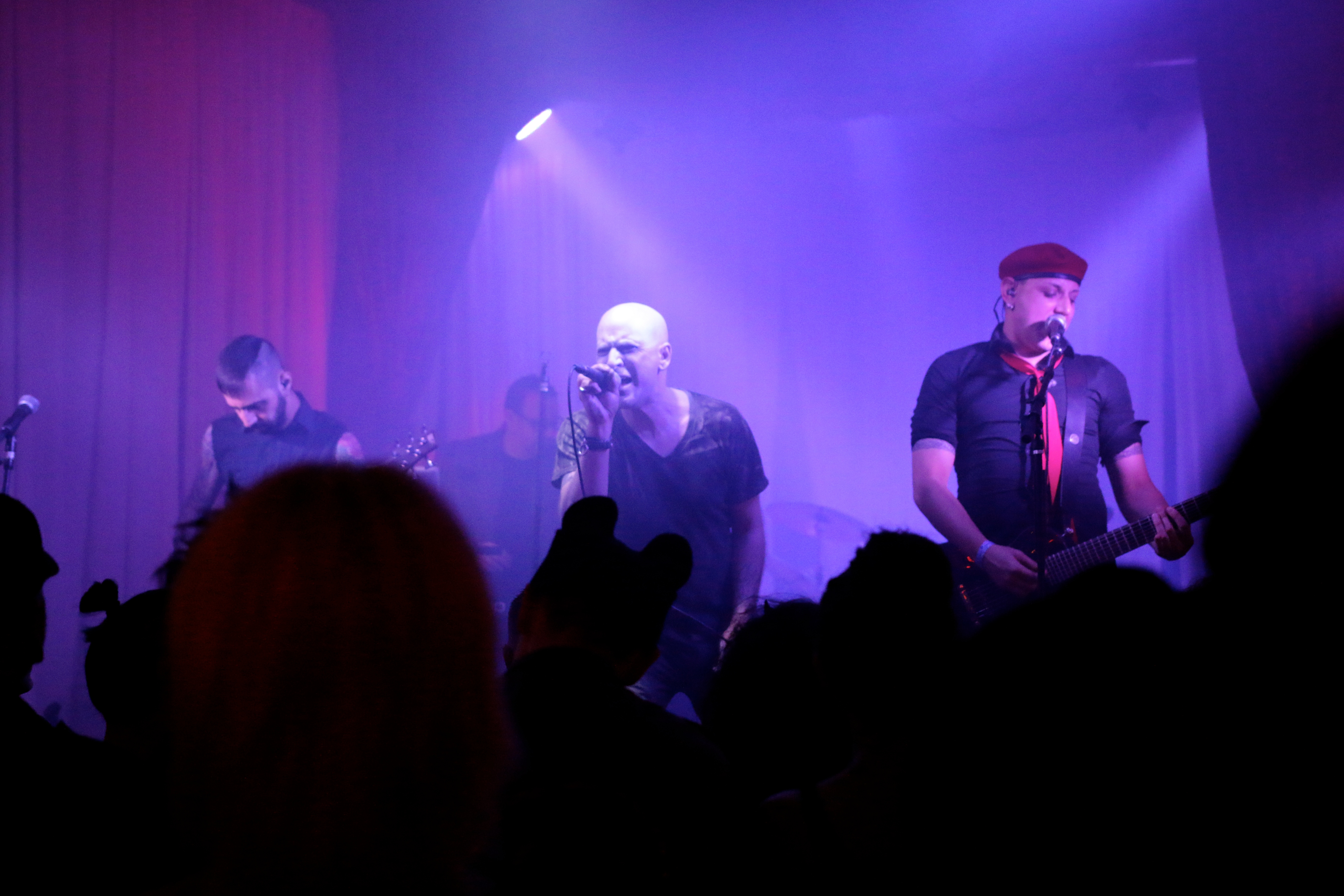
- Kevorkian Death Cycle in 2012

Background information
- Also known as: Grid
- Origin: Riverside, California, U.S.
- Genres: Electro-industrial, industrial rock
- Years active: 1992–present
- Labels: Ras Dva; Metropolis; Negative Gain Productions
- Members: Ryan Gribbin; Roger Jarvis; Rob Robinson; Greg Ripes; Mike J; Sean Whiteman
- Past members: Brett Cardamone; Travers Bell; Ryan Daily; Jason Todrick
- Website: kdcngp.bandcamp.com

Kevorkian Death Cycle is an American electro-industrial band from Riverside, California, founded by Ryan Gribbin and Roger Jarvis. The band was originally named Grid and later changed their name to the politically motivated "Kevorkian Death Cycle".

== Career ==
The band's first demo, Distorted Noise Arrythmia, was released under the name Grid in 1992, a name that roots back to the term Gay Related Immune Deficiency (or GRID) which is what the AIDS virus was first dubbed in 1982. The duo then released two more demos as Kevorkian Death Cycle before being signed to Ras Dva. The band's name was often assumed to be for shock value, but the band has been adamant in their support of right to die by physician-assisted suicide, and, by extension, critics of organized religion for being against it.

The band released its first album, Collection for Injection, on the Ras Dva label. After a 1997 tour with Spahn Ranch, they became popular with the underground community. The band moved to the Metropolis label in 1998 and in the fall released their second album Dark Skies. They later played with Front 242 and went on tour with Front Line Assembly.

In 1999, they released their third album, A+0(M). This album contained a cover of Frankie Goes to Hollywood's "Relax". The album peaked at #7 on the CMJ RPM Charts in the U.S. That year the band also went on their two-month "Free Jack" tour of North America. ("Jack" here refers to Jack Kevorkian.)

Collection for Injection was re-issued in 2000, and a re-mix single of their cover of "Relax" was released in 2001.

As a side project, in the spring of 2006, Roger Jarvis joined Taury Goforth from Dead Hand Projekt to form an Industrial/EBM/IDM band called HexRx.

KDC returned in 2013 with three out of the original four members with a series of releases including a new album, God Am I, and its single "Mind Decay".

== Discography ==
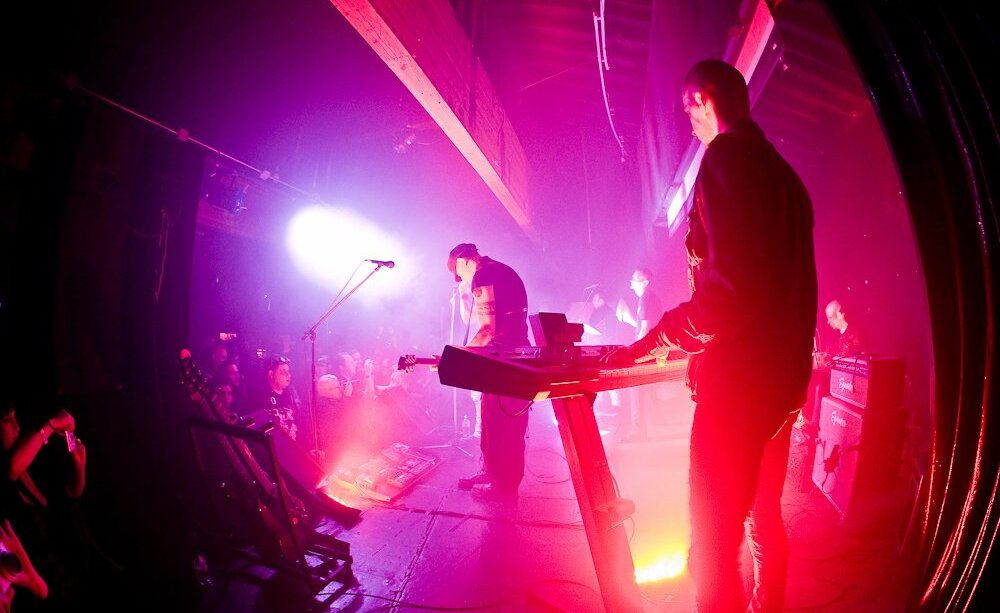
Kevorkian Death Cycle performing in 2010

- Distorted Noise Arrythmia (1992)
- Collection for Injection (1996)
- Dark Skies (1998)
- A + 0 [m] (1999)
- "Relax" (2000, single)
- "Mind Decay" (2013, single)
- God Am I (2013)
- "Distorted Religion" (2014, single)
- I Am God (2015)
