= Die Form =

French post-industrial/electronic band

- Origin: France
- Genres: Coldwave (early); post-industrial; neoclassical dark wave
- Years active: 1977–present
- Labels: Bain Total; Normal; Parade Amoureuse; Danceteria; Hyperium; Trisol; Out of Line; Metropolis
- Spinoffs: D.Sign; Ukiyo; Société Anonyme; Sombre Printemps; Elektrode
- Members: Philippe Fichot; Éliane P. (since 1986)
- Website: www.dieform.net

Die Form is a French post-industrial and electronic band formed in 1977–78. The name 'Die Form' means '(the) form/shape' in German, like the Bauhaus diary, and is a play on the English homonym 'deform' and on the French homonym 'difforme' (deformed).

== Biography ==
Die Form is the primary project of the French electronic musician and multimedia artist Philippe Fichot. He began his own record label, Bain Total, in 1977 and began recording a number of experimental cassette releases as Die Form, starting with Die Form 1 in 1977, with the first Die Form vinyl release ('Die Puppe') appearing in 1982. Whilst the project was still in its infancy, the underlying concepts were still evident - a combination of esoteric electronic experiments with an underlying theme of erotism, death and other 'taboo' subjects, apparent in both the music and the album artwork, which Philippe also produces. Other early projects of Philippe Fichot included Krylon Hertz, Mental Code, Camera Obscura, Eva-Johanna Reichstag, Hurt and Fine Automatic.

'Some Experiences With Shock' followed in 1984, with the project taking a direction towards a more commercial sound on 1986's 'Poupée Mécanique'. The project then consolidated its experimental and melodic sides on 'Photogrammes', before introducing vocalist (and model) Eliane P. on the 1991 album 'Corpus Delicti', who remains with the project to this day. The next release, 1992's 'Confessions' saw a club hit in 'Silent Order', with sister album 'Ad Infinitum' (which originated from the same recording sessions) released a year later.

The next 'Die Form' releases saw the poetic, emotional side of their sound richen via 'The Trilogy of Passions', starting with 'Suspiria De Profundis' in 1994, followed by 'L'âme électrique' the following year. 1997's 'Duality' does not complete the trilogy, Phillipe Fichot choosing to leave the project open-ended. The 'Histories' compilation discs appeared in 1998, with the next album 'Extremum/XX' appearing in 2000. Then followed the 'diptych' of 'InHuman' (2004) and 'ExHuman' (2006), continuing their release of interrelated concept albums.

"The Bach project" was released in January 2008, an album obviously devoted to Bach. Die Form first presented this work live during the annual Bach Days in the German city of Leipzig, where they got invited. Die Form has created a new show for this project with the German dancer Sabine Seume.

Die Form left Trisol to join Out of Line in late 2008. A new single, "Her[t]z Frequenz", was released in October 2008, followed by the "Best of XXX" in November 2008 (a compilation with reworked and remastered songs from the past 30 years).

In 2009, "Noir Magnétique" saw Die Form back in a club-oriented sound. The album was made available on CD only, with a special edition limited to 999 copies in a box with a 7-inch single and extra artwork. Die Form created a new show with Laina Fischbeck on stage.

In March 2010, a vinyl boxset compilation of early K-Cassette material was released on Vinyl-On-Demand.

In 2011, a double-CD digipak limited edition of Sombre Printemps ("Ambient & Film Music 1+2") has been released on Out Of Line.

== Discography ==
=== Albums ===
- 1982: Die Puppe (LP and Cassette, CD issued in 1986, remastered CD issued in 2001 as 'Die Puppe II')
- 1983: Some Experiences with Shock (LP and Cassette, CD issued in 1986, remastered CD issued in 2001)
- 1987: Poupée Mécanique (LP and CD, remastered CD issued in 2001)
- 1988: Photogrammes (LP and CD, remastered CD version issued in 2001)
- 1990: Corpus Delicti (LP, CD and Cassette, remastered CD issued in 2001 as 'Corpus Delicti 2')
- 1992: Confessions (LP, CD and Cassette, remastered CD issued in 2001)
- 1993: Ad Infinitum (LP and CD, remastered CD issued in 2002)
- 1994: Suspiria de Profundis (CD only, remastered CD issued in 2002)
- 1995: L'âme électrique (CD only, remastered CD issued in 2002)
- 1997: Duality (CD only)
- 2000: Extremum/XX (CD and LP)
- 2004: InHuman (CD and LP)
- 2006: ExHuman (CD only)
- 2008: Bach Project (CD only)
- 2009: Noir Magnétique (CD only)
- 2014: Rayon X (CD and LP)
- 2017: Baroque Equinox (3 Editions, Boxset, CD and LP)
- 2021: Mental Camera (CD, LP, Book, Box)

=== Compilations ===
- 1988: Archives & Doküments (CD and LP, reissued as 'Archives & Documents II' in 1991, and as a remastered 'Archives & Documents III' in 2001)
- 1996: Vicious Circles: The Best Of (CD only)
- 1998: Histories (US edition released as double CD, European edition released as separated CDs 'Histories 1' and 'Histories 2')
- 2001: AKT - Sideprojects & Experimental Collection (CD only)
- 2008: Best of XXX (3 CD box)
- 2010: Chronology - The Bain Total Years 1.977-1.985 (6 LP + 7-inch)
- 2015: Die Form ÷ Fine Automatic (2 LP)

=== Singles & EPs ===
- 1977: Bain Total Cleaning Solution, Music for Deaf and Dumb Persons + Mini albums 1 & 2 (1 copy metal albums, Bain Total)
- 1978: Zoophilic Lolita / Tanz (split 7-inch single with Eva.Johanna Reichstag, Bain Total)
- 1981: Situation Base / Gestual Equivoque (split 7” with Metabolist, Bain Total)
- 1984: Autolyse / Masochist (split EP with Portion Control and Rinf, Free 1984 Sect. One, Lacerba)
- 1984: Heart Of The Monster (7-inch single, Front de l'Est)
- 1986: Slow Love (12-inch, Attitudes)
- 1988: Face to Face, Vol. 1 (Split-LP with Asmus Tietchens)
- 1988: Poupée Mécanique / Sadia (7-inch single, New Rose)
- 1989: After The Last Gaze (7-inch single, bonus with limited edition Die Puppe LP, Normal)
- 1989: Présence (7-inch single, bonus with limited edition Some Experiments With Shock LP, Normal)
- 1989: Teufel Im Leibe (7-inch single, New Life)
- 1990: Slow Love (7-inch single, bonus with limited edition Poupée Mécanique LP, Normal)
- 1990: Savage Logic (12-inch & MCD, Parade Amoureuse)
- 1992: Imagine / Impudicus Rex (7-inch single, Scharlach)
- 1993: Tears of Eros (MCD, Hyperium)
- 1994: Silent Order / Re-Versions (MCD, Hyperium)
- 1994: Rose au Coeur Violet (MCD, Hyperium)
- 1996: Phenomena of Visitation (MCD, Hyperium)
- 1998: The Hidden Cage / Spiral (12-inch & MCD, Trisol)
- 1998: Automatic Love (split 7-inch with The Nuns, Musical Tragedies)
- 1999: Rain of Blood (MCD, Trisol)
- 2000: Deep Inside (12-inch & MCD, Trisol)
- 2003: Zoopsia (12-inch & MCD + video track, Trisol)
- 2009: Kobol (7-inch single, Noir Magnétique limited edition boxset, Out of Line)
- 2014: Schaulust (MCD, Out of Line)
- 2017: Psychic Poison (MCD, Trisol)
- 2017: S(P)LIT / FLUXUS (LP) with Mama Baer (dedicated to Hubert Toyot)*2008: Her[t]z Frequenz (MCD, Out of Line)

=== Videos ===
- 1995: Phenomena of Visitation (VHS, Bain Total)
- 1998: Videography Vol.1 (VHS, Trisol)
- 2017: Psychic Poison (DVD, Exclusively available in the Baroque Equinox box, Bain Total)

=== Tapes (K-Cassettes) ===
- 1978: Product 002/K.01 "I" (2 different covers)
- 1978: Product 003/K.02 KRYLON HERTZ "I" (C.20, and re-issue C.30)
- 1980: ENDLESS K7 1 : FINE AUTOMATIC "Caddy Musak"
- 1980: ENDLESS K7 2 : FINE AUTOMATIC "Freezer Musak"
- 1980: ENDLESS K7 3 : FINE AUTOMATIC "Flipper Musak"
- 1981: ENDLESS K7 4 : DIE FORM "Disabled Landscape"
- 1981: K.04 "Virgin Flavour"
- 1981: K.05 KRYLON HERTZ "Smuggle Death"
- 1981: K.06 "Eva-Johanna REICHSTAG & DIE FORM : Memorial 78-79"
- 1982: K.08 FINE AUTOMATIC (C.60) (re-issue from the endless cassettes)
- 1982: K.10 CAMERA OBSCURA "1"
- 1982: K.11 CAMERA OBSCURA "2"
- 1982: K.12 CAMERA OBSCURA "3" & DIE FORM "Final Edition"
- 1982: K.14 "Le Plomb des Cartes" / "La Loge Infernale"
- 1983: K.16 MENTAL CODE "Flexible Music Vol. 2/3"
- 1983: K.18 "Images du Monde" ("Best of" Die Form/Eva-Johanna Reichstag)
- 1983: K.19 "Excisions" (3 different covers)
- 1983: K.20 "Archives & Doküments 1"
- 1985: K.22 "Du Coeur Humain"
- 1985: K.25 "Red Action" (co-production B.T./T.M., other side by KOSA)
- 1985: K.27 FINE AUTOMATIC / D.F. SADIST SCHOOL "OrgasMechanism"
- 1985: K.28 GRAPH 4 "Messe Basse" (one side cassette) (poems soundtrack)
- 1985: K.29 "HURT" D.F. SADIST SCHOOL (one side cassette)
- 1986: K.F. "Fetish 1" (C.50)
- 1986: K.04 "Virgin Flavour 2" C.60 (re-issue, total remix extra-track)
- 1986: K.14 "Le Plomb des Cartes" / "La Loge Infernale" (C.90) (re-issue, total remix extra-track)
- 1986: K.X. "X.ACTION" (SADIST SCHOOL 1.984)
- 1987: K.30 "Die Puppe" (C.50) (re-issue of the first LP / 1982)
- 1987: K.31 "Some Experiences With Shock" (re-issue of the 2nd LP / 1984)
- 1987: K.32 "Es lebe der Tod" (C.50)
- 1989: K.35 "Flexible Music vol.1" (guest : DZ LECTRIC)
- 1998: "Limited Documents Vol. 1" (incl. unreleased tracks of 1982–86, limited edition of 300 copies with 1 original photo)

=== Side projects ===
D.Sign - Project with Philippe Fichot, Éliane P. & Mark Verhaeghen (Klinik)

- 1991: D.Sign (12-inch & MCD, Antler-Subway)

Die Form Sadist School

- 1990: Les Cent Vingt Journées de Sodome (LP & CD, Die Form Side-Project 1, Parade Amoureuse)
- 1992: Bacterium (Split 12-inch & CD with Etant Donnés (Tracks 1-3 DFSS, Tracks 4-6 Etant Donnés, Danceteria)
- 1995: The Visionary Garden (CD, Die Form Side-Project 6, Hyperium)
- 2005: The Visionary Garden 2 (CD re-release with 1 Videotrack, Ultra Mail Prod)

Société Anonyme

- 1991: S.A. 123 (LP, CD & Cassette, Die Form Side-Project 2, Danceteria)

Sombre Printemps

- 1991: Ambient & Film Music (LP & CD, Die Form Side-Project 3, Danceteria)
- 2011: Ambient & Film Music 1+2 (Double CD, Out Of Line)

Elektrode

- 1993: Die Operative Maschine (CD, Die Form Side-Project 4, Hyperium)

Ukiyo - Die Form and Akifumi Nakajima|Aube

- 1994: Ukiyo (CD, Die Form Side-Project 5, Hyperium/Hypnobeat)

Die Form ÷ Musique Concrète

- 2015: Cinema Obscura (CD, Bain Total)

Outre Mondes

- 2024: Outre Mondes / Ph. Fichot Solo Project (LP, Book, Bain Total)
