= YelworC =

German electro-industrial band

yelworC
- Origin: Munich
- Genres: Electro-industrial; dark electro
- Years active: 1987–1994, 2003–2011
- Labels: Metropolis; Danse Macabre; Celtic Circle Productions; Minuswelt Musikfabrik
- Spinoffs: amGod
- Members: Peter Schiffmann
- Past members: Oliver Büttner

yelworC was an electro-industrial band from Germany.

The group was formed in 1987 by Peter Schiffmann (a.k.a. Peter Devin) and Oliver Büttner (a.k.a. Dominik van Reich). Their name is "Aleister Crowley" read backwards, and their music reflects themes of dark magic, religious rituals, death, and violence.

== History ==
The duo put out a number of demo tapes in 1988–1990 until they were finally signed to the now defunct Celtic Circle Productions (C.C.P.) recording label and released their first full-length CD album Brainstorming in December 1992. Brainstorming was followed up by the Blood in Face EP, which featured remixes from the album with additional new material.

Their music consists of gloomy synthesizers mixed with abrasive dance-beats, overlaid with distorted vocals and the occasional audio sample taken from various horror films. The musical result is a style akin to Skinny Puppy, that has inspired many other groups in the electro-industrial and gothic genres.

In 1994 yelworC unexpectedly split up, with Büttner heading off to form the more experimental sounding amGod ("dogma" backwards) and cutting one album Half Rotten and Decayed under the C.C.P. label. Schiffmann fought and successfully kept the rights to use the name yelworC.

In 2004 Schiffmann released a new studio album entitled Trinity; the first release from yelworC in over ten years and the first of planned trilogy of albums. The album, containing some material composed during the late 1990s, is based on Dante's journey through Hell as told in the first part of The Divine Comedy, Inferno. It features a guest appearance by Dennis Ostermann of In Strict Confidence on the song Vexilla Regis Inferni.

The second in the planned album trilogy, Icolation, was released in October 2007. It continued the concept of Trinity, using themes from the second part of The Divine Comedy, Purgatorio.

Trinity, Icolation, and the Eclosion EP were released jointly through Schiffmann's Baal Records label with distribution through Dennis Ostermann's Minuswelt label, the latter of which was initially a vehicle for In Strict Confidence releases, but has since expanded. Schiffmann and Ostermann met during the first run of yelworC in the 1990s, with their continuing contact leading to the label collaboration and ongoing artistic support.

In 2023, GH Records released limited vinyl reissues of four original yelworC releases: Dis-Cover and Con-Trol, Brainstorming, Flash, Wards, and Incubation, and A.I.W.A.S.S.. In 2024, the band released The Ghosts I Called, an album of new material compiled since 2013.

== Discography ==
- "Rising as Phoenix from its Ashes" (1988) cassette demo
- "The Mystery Side of Democracy" (1988) cassette demo
- "Flash, Wards, and Incubation" (1989) cassette demo
- "Dis-Cover and Con-Trol" (1989) cassette demo
- "A.I.W.A.S.S." (1990) cassette demo
- "Satanat" (1991) (Danse Macabre) cassette compilation 1987 – 1990
- "Tanatas" (1991) (Danse Macabre) cassette single
- "Brainstorming"(1992) (C.C.P./Semaphore) CD album
- "Blood in Face" (1993) (C.C.P./EFA) CD EP
- "Brainstorming" (1994) (C.C.P./EFA) CD album reissue
- "Collection: 1988 – 1994" (1995) (C.C.P./EFA) 2xCD compilation
- "Trinity" (2004) (Baal Records, Minuswelt Musikfabrik/Soulfood, Metropolis Records) CD album
- "Eclosion" (2007) (Baal Records, Minuswelt Musikfabrik/Soulfood) CD EP
- "Icolation" (2007) (Baal Records, Minuswelt Musikfabrik/Soulfood, Metropilos Records) CD album
- "The Ghosts I Called" (2024) (Metropolis Records) digital album

=== Compilation appearances ===
- "Art & Dance 4" (1993) (Discordia) CD track#3 "Deadly Visions" and track #4 "Legion"
- "Celtic Circle Sampler Part One" (1993) (Celtic Circle Productions) 2xCD disc #1 track #6 "Crucified West"
- "Electronic Youth Vol. 1" (1993) (Music Research) CD track #1 "Chains (Rapture Fear Mix)"
- "German Mystic Sound Sampler Volume IV" (1993) (Zillo) LP side B track #2/CD track #8 "Sacred City"
- "Body Rapture Vol. 3" (1994) (Zoth Ommog) CD track #13 "Recall"
- "Celtic Circle Sampler Part Two" (1994) (Celtic Circle Productions) 2xCD disc #2 track #11 "Combat (Remix)"
- "Essence of ConSequence" (1994) (ConSequence Records) CD track #11 "Red Sun"
- "Living for Music" (1994) (Discordia) CD rack #6 "Blood In Face"
- "Moonraker" (1994) (Sub Terranean) 2xCD disc #1 track 7 "Soulhunter"
- "Celtic Circle Sampler Part Three" (1995) (Celtic Circle Productions) 2xCD disc #2 track #11 "Crucifixion Of Scarlet Angel (Remix)"
- "Taste This 4" (1995) (Discordia) 2xCD disc #1 track #3 "Prodigies of Black"
- "Vertigo Compilation 01/1996" (1996) (Celtic Circle Productions) CD track #7 "Spy vs. Spy (Remix)"
- "14 Years of Electronic Challenge Vol. II" (1997) (COP International) CD track #14 "Blood In Face"
- "Zillo Mystic Sounds 4" (1998) (Zillo) track #8 "Sacred City" Note: band named misspelled as Yelwork
- "Proven In Action" (2003) (First Aid Recordings) CD track #10 "Triune Junction"
- ":Per:Version: Vol. 10" (2004) (:Ritual:) CD Enhanced w/mp3s track #5 "Triune Junction"
- "Cortex Compilation Vol. 1" (2004) (Minuswelt Musikfabrik) CD track #1 "Without Remorse"
- "Sonic Seducer Cold Hands Seduction Vol. 34" (2004) (Sonic Seducer) 2xCD Enhanced w/videos disc #1 track # 2 "Bloodwhited Cut"
- "Endzeit Bunkertracks [Act 1]" (2005) (Alfa Matrix) 4xCD Box Set disc #4 track #1 "Doom of Choronzon"
- "Old School Electrology Volume One" (2011) (Electro Aggression Records) 4xCD Box Set disc #3 track #9 "Teufels Dreizack Part I"

=== Video compilation appearance ===
- "Delta-O : Electro-Wave Compilation" (Veni, Vidi, Descripsi) VHS video #8 "Sacred City"
