= The Neon Judgement =

Belgian band

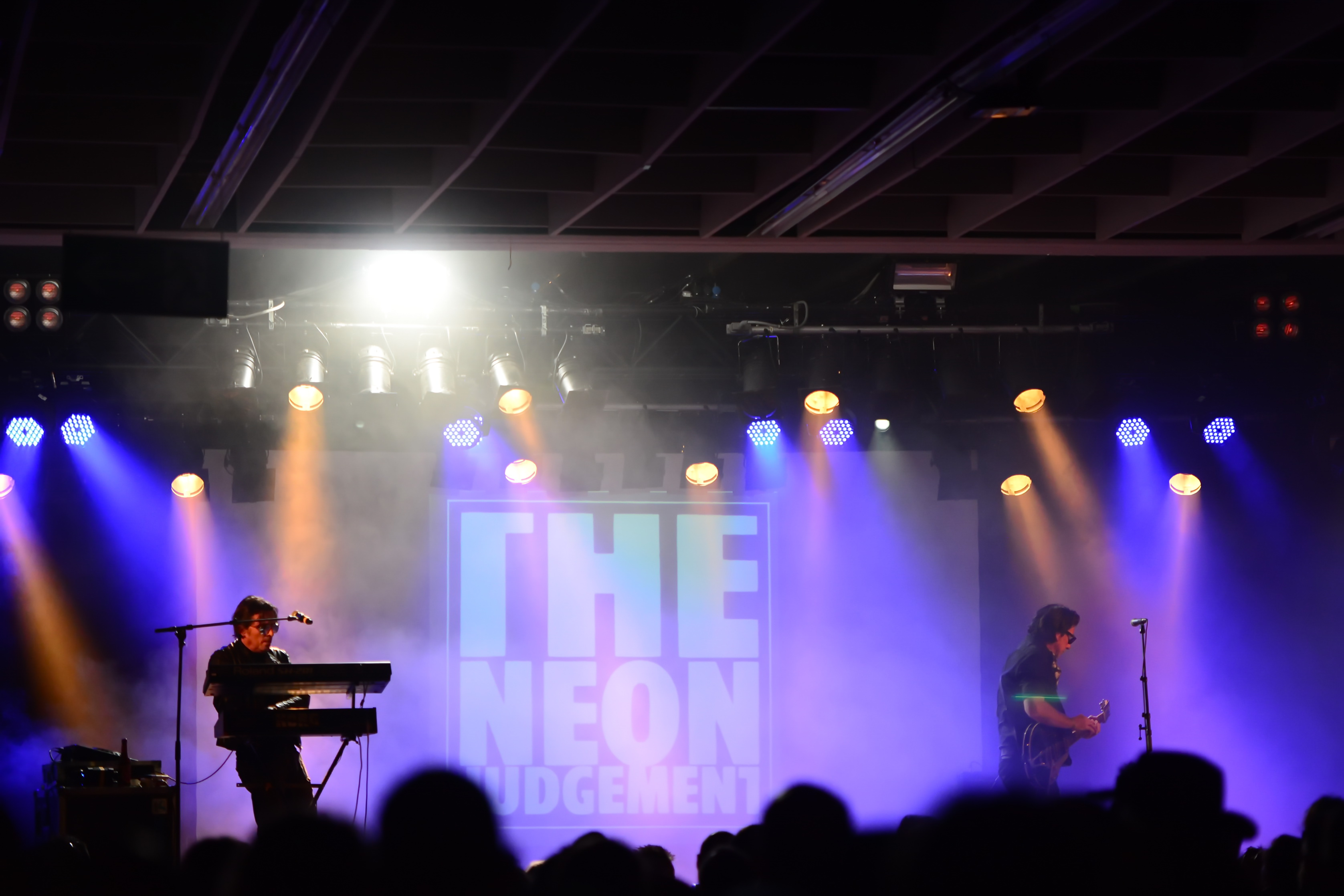

Background information
- Origin: Leuven, Belgium
- Genres: New wave; industrial; synth-pop; EBM
- Years active: 1981–2015
- Labels: DanceDelic-D; Le Son du Maquis; PIAS
- Members: Dirk Timmermans; Frank Vloeberghs
- Website: www.theneonjudgement.com

The Neon Judgement is a Belgian new wave band, formed in Leuven in 1981 by Dirk Da Davo (born Dirk Timmermans, keyboards/vocalist) and TB Frank (born Frank Vloeberghs, guitarist/vocalist). They have often been cited, alongside fellow Belgian band Front 242, as the pioneers of electronic body music (EBM), an electronic dance genre from the early 1980s combining industrial and electro music.

== History ==
Dirk Timmermans (a.k.a. Dirk Da Davo) and Frank Vloeberghs (a.k.a. TB Frank) combined minimalist industrial drones and new wave synth-pop and dance music, with cold, mechanical rhythms. Their early work was aggressive, danceable and dominated by synthesizers and drum-machines. Later in their career, their work featured prominent guitars. Their early influences included The Velvet Underground and Pink Floyd. Suburban Voice noted "catchy songs" in a similar vein to early OMD and 154-period Wire.

The band self-released a pair of cassettes before landing their first single, 1982's "Factory Walk." Most of their subsequent output was on the Belgian Play It Again Sam label, beginning with 1986's Mafu Cage. Their first American release came in 1987, with the sex-themed concept album, Horny As Hell which included the well-received dance track, "Miss Brown. Subsequent recordings included Blood and Thunder (1989), The Insult (1990), and Are You Real (1992). The duo took a three-year hiatus in 1992, returning in 1995 with At Devil's Fork, an LP recorded with percussionist Ben Forceville entirely in a wooded area.

The band stopped performing in 1998, but reformed in 2004 and started performing live again to promote a series of remixes and re-releases of their material. The touring continued into 2006, with the band stating on their website that "Live, The Neon Judgement will continue to give art terrorism a good name, finding new ways of marrying noise and beauty, machines and magic".

Timmermans is also part of the side project Neon Electronics, for which he started his own record label Dancedelic-D and he both reworks old classics and composes new material.

In November 2005, the Neon Judgement played at the Machina Festival at the Broadway Club in São Paulo, Brazil. The festival celebrated the first eight years of the site FiberOnline and the launch of the label Fiber Records. Fiber Records released the DVD The Neon Judgement – Live at Machina Festival in 2005 featuring the whole concert of 13 songs.

In 2007, the band released the compilation album Redbox. The release followed the 100% vintage 2 CD Box released in October 2005. Redbox mainly contains the band's work during the second half of the 1980s. The album also features remixes from acts such as David Carretta, Blackstrobe, Lifelike, and Helmut Kraft. Redbox also contains a new cover version of "Heroes" by David Bowie.

The band released another album, Smack, in 2009.

== Discography ==
=== Albums ===
- Suffering (mini-album) (1981)
- MBIH! (mini-album) (1985)
- Mafu Cage (1986)
- Horny as Hell (1988)
- Blood and Thunder (1989)
- The Insult (1990)
- Are You Real (1991)
- At Devil's Fork (1995)
- Dazsoo (1998)
- Smack (2009)
- We Never Said You're No Good (2012)

=== Compilation albums ===
- The Neon Judgement 1981-1984 (1985)
- The First Judgements (1987)
- General Pain and Major Disease (1989)
- The First Judgements (2005 re-release)
- The First Judgements - Outbox (2005)
- Box (2005)
- Redbox (2007)
- Remixed Box (2007)
- A Fashion Party - Live @ AB Bxl (2008)
- Early Tapes (2010)

=== Singles and EPs ===
- "TV Treated" (1982)
- "Factory Walk" (1982)
- "Cockerill Sombre" (1983)
- "Concrete" (1984)
- "Tomorrow in the Papers" (1985)
- "Awful Day" (1986)
- "Voodoo Nipplefield" (1986)
- "A Man Ain't No Man When A Man Ain't Got No Horse, Man" (1987)
- "Miss Brown" (1987)
- "TV Treated" (1989)
- "Games of Love" (1989)
- "1313" (1989)
- "Alaska Highway" (1990)
- "Baby's On Fire" (1991)
- "A Nicer Person" (1995)
- "Out Of My Mind" (1998)
- "Jazzbox" (1998)
- "Machine Life" (2005)
- Smack EP (2010)

== Gallery ==
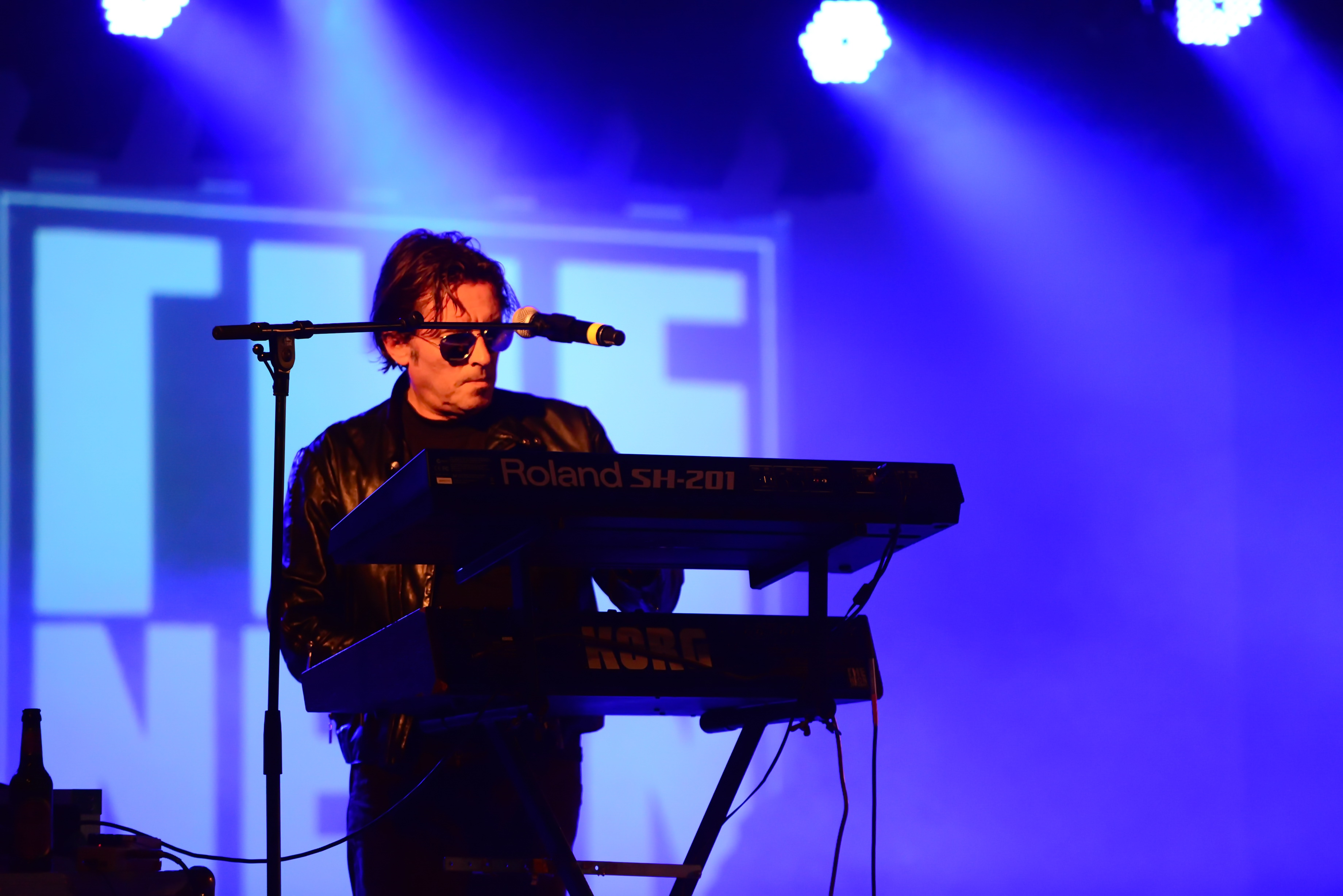

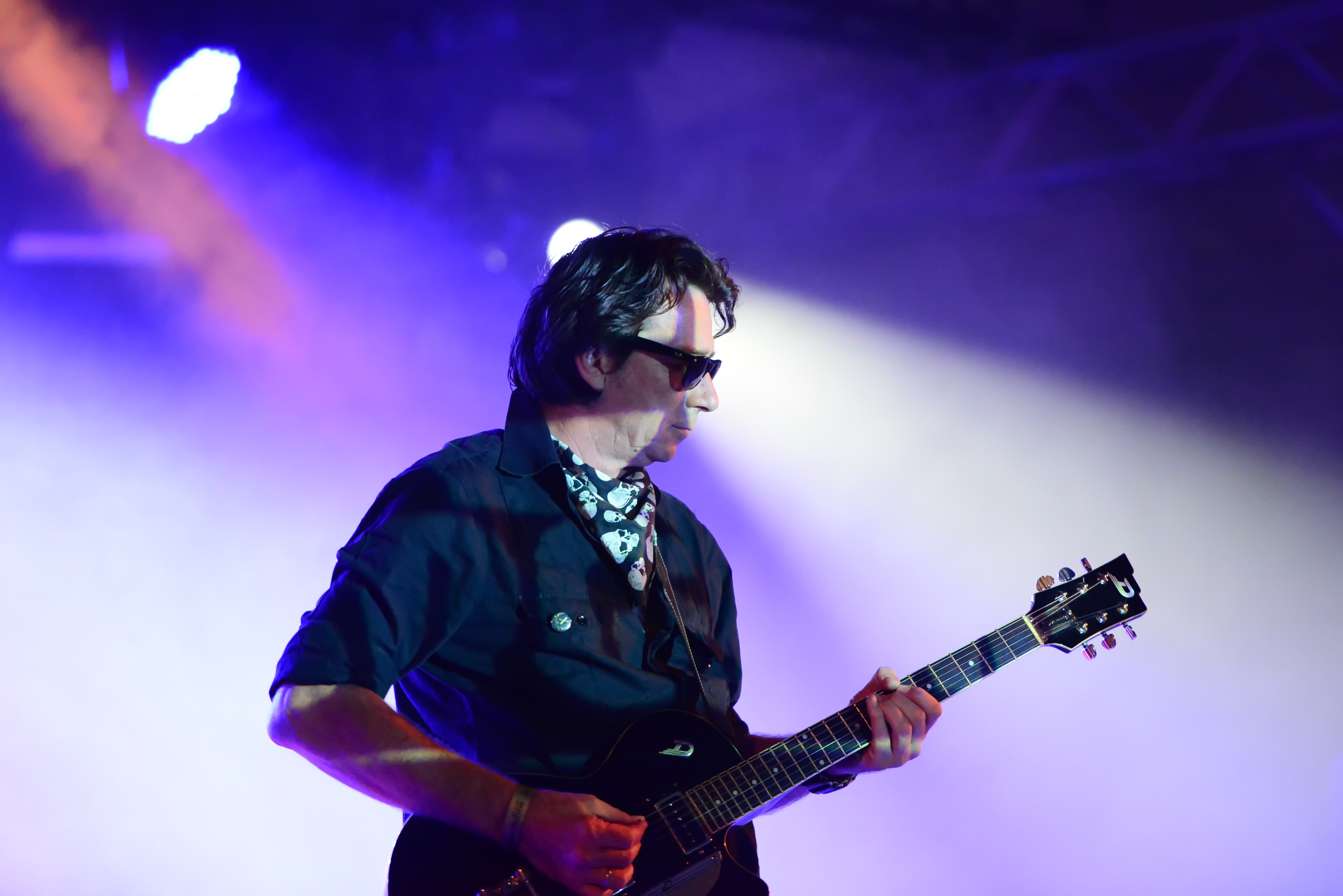
