= Pouppée Fabrikk =

Swedish electronic music band

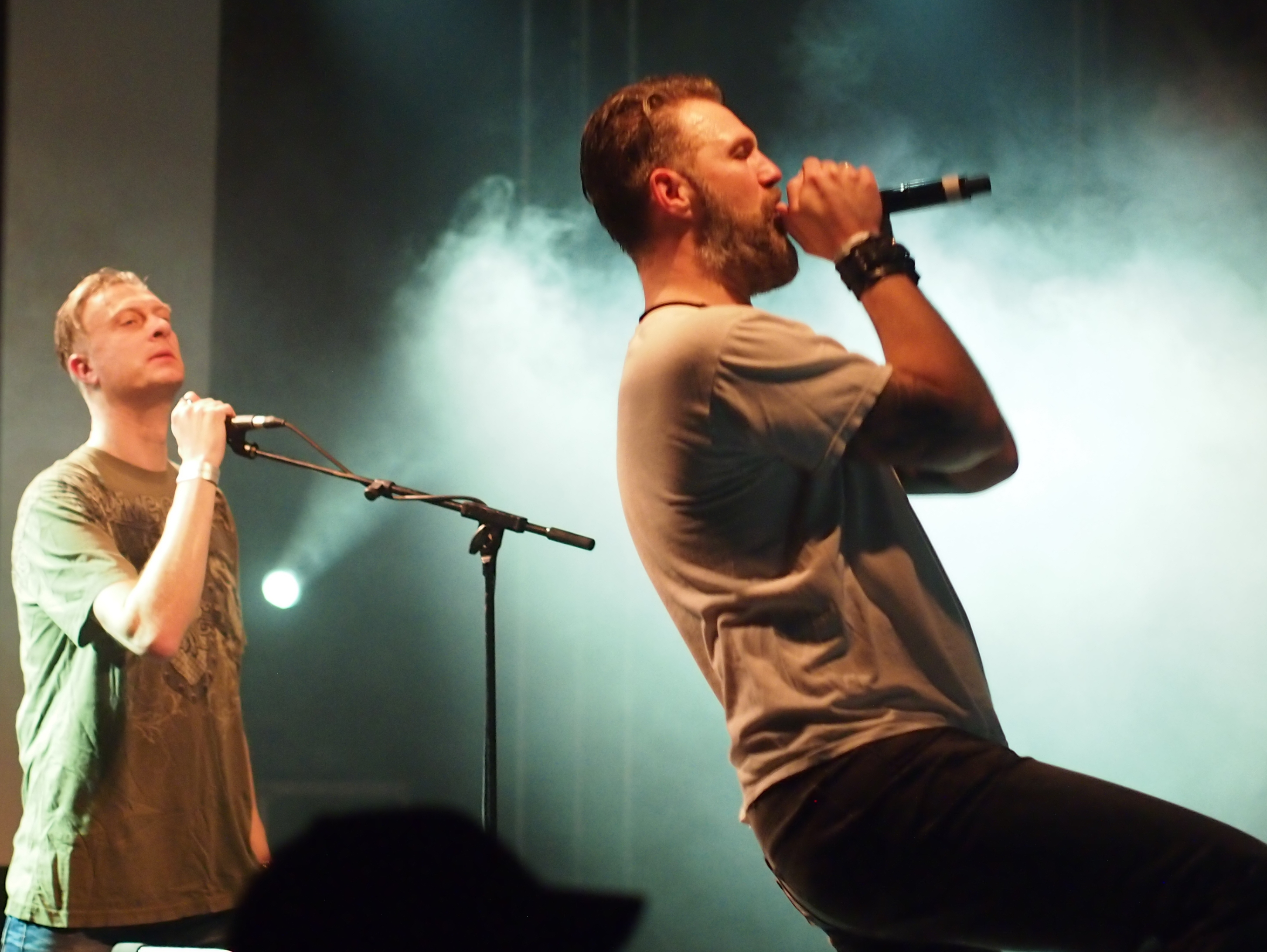
- Pouppée Fabrikk at E-Tropolis 2014

Background information
- Origin: Karlskoga, Sweden
- Genres: Electronic body music; Industrial metal
- Years active: 1988–present
- Labels: Energy Rekords; Prototyp; Alfa Matrix
- Members: Leif Holm; Jonas Aneheim; Christiaan Riemslag; Henrik Björkk
- Past members: Jouni Ollila
- Website: www.myspace.com/pouppeefabrikk/

Pouppée Fabrikk is a Swedish EBM band, started in 1988 by Henrik Björkk and Leif Holm, who both hail from Karlskoga.

== History ==
The band name has no meaning. It was constructed from a combination of the French word "Poupée" (doll) and Norwegian "Fabrikk" (factory). Originally the band name was meant to be Poupé Fabrikk, but when a friend made their first posters he incorrectly spelt it "Pouppée Fabrikk" and the band liked it.

Initially, the music of Pouppée Fabrikk was influenced by minimalistic electronic acts such as Deutsch Amerikanische Freundschaft and Nitzer Ebb, in a style some refer to as "Elektronisk Kroppsmusik" or EKM – the Swedish translation of "Electronic Body Music." With the addition of Jouni Ollila and Jonas Aneheim on guitar the group moved towards a more crossover/metal style that was not always well received by fans.

The band's first album, Rage, was released in 1990 and quickly followed the next year by Portent. The latter featured guest vocals on the track "T.O.T.D.N." by Cat Rapes Dog vocalist Joel Rydström.

The album Your Pain - Our Gain CD was meant to be released in 1996, but due to differences in opinion between the band and the record company (Energy Rekords) it was delayed until 1999. In 1996 the band decided to take a break and Pouppée Fabrikk was put on hold and the band members worked on various solo projects.

In 2000 the band re-united for a performance at the Tinitus Electronic Festival and announced that they were making a comeback and returning to their roots. They released a four track mini CD in 2001 entitled Elite Electronics. A year later both Ollila and Björkk left the band to concentrate on their respective solo careers.

After seven years of dormancy, the band re-united in 2009 with Christiaan Riemslag filling the place of former member Jouni Ollila. The band embarked on numerous live performances in 2010 & 2011 including at Bodyfest in Fryshuset, Sweden, BIMfest in Belgium, and the first of several appearances at Wave-Gotik-Treffen in Germany.

In 2013, the band compiled unreleased and remastered demo tracks along with a few new songs for release on Alfa Matrix as The Dirt. In 2017, the band "upgraded" two classic tracks – "Watch Your Sex" and "No Way Back" – as a digitally released single to promote their second appearance at Wave-Gotik-Treffen that year.

In 2019, the band announced the production of a new album, Armén, the first full-length album of new material since 1998. The band's lyrical output has always been in English, but Armén featured the band's first Swedish language track, “Kom Ta Min Smärta.” Björkk – with the mastering assistance of former member Jouni Ollila – took the lead in producing Armén, adopting a more aggressive political theme along with his stated intent "to make the hardest goddamn EBM album ever."

The COVID-19 pandemic preempted a planned tour in 2020, but the band announced plans to use the time to produce new material. At the end of 2020, the band released the single "Burn Forever," featuring remixes by Blush Response and Kreign, and Alfa Matrix released a six-disc limited box set anthology entitled E K M . Anthology 1989-2019.

== Discography ==
=== Albums ===
Title	Details
Rage	Released: 1990; Label: Energy Rekords; Formats: CD, LP
Portent	Released: 1991; Label: Energy Rekords; Formats: CD, LP
We Have Come To Drop Bombs	Released: 1994; Label: Energy Rekords; Formats: CD
Djävulen	Released: 1998; Label: Energy Rekords; Formats: CD
Your Pain - Our Gain	Released: 1999; Label: Energy Rekords; Formats: CD
The Dirt	Released: 2013; Label: Alfa Matrix; Formats: CD, Digital
Armén	Released: 2020; Label: Alfa Matrix; Formats: CD, LP, Digital

=== Singles and EPs ===
Title	Details
Die Jugend	Released: 1990; Label: Cock Production; Formats: 7"
Summoning	Released: 1990; Label: Last Chance Records, Energy Rekords; Formats: 12", CD
Betrayal	Released: 1992; Label: Energy Rekords; Formats: CD
I Want Candy	Released: 1993; Label: Energy Rekords; Formats: CD
Elite Electronics	Released: 2001; Label: Prototyp; Formats: CD
Bring Back The Ways Of Old	Released: 2013; Label: Alfa Matrix; Formats: Digital
H8 U	Released: 2013; Label: Alfa Matrix; Formats: Digital
Only Control	Released: 2019; Label: Alfa Matrix; Formats: Digital
Burn Forever	Released: 2020; Label: Alfa Matrix; Formats: Digital

=== Compilations ===
Title	Details
Crusader	Released: 1992; Label: Energy Rekords; Formats: CD, Cass
E K M . Anthology 1989-2019	Released: 2020; Label: Alfa Matrix; Formats: CD Box, Digital

== Side projects ==
Henrik N Björkk Folkstorm, HH9, Muskel, Nordvargr, Toroidh, All Hail The Transcending Ghost, D.I.N., Econocon, Goatvargr, Incinerator International, Körperwelten, L/A/B, Lorv, Maschinenzimmer 412/Mz.412, Naer Mataron, Nordvargr/Drakh, Thee Maldoror Kollective

Leif Holm CAP, Dworgend, Stürm

Jouni Ollila Alk0, Ater Koma, Econocon, Little Blue Men, Mr. Jones Machine, Maschinenzimmer 412/Mz.412, Project-X, Twin Freaks, BURG

Jonas Aneheim Beyond Sensory Experience, Maschinenzimmer 412/Mz.412, Nordvargr/Drakh, L/A/B, 1920Hillcrest, Al-Wahaar Dhin, Spyah

Christiaan Riemslag Volt, CAP, Menticide
