= Cat Rapes Dog =

Swedish electropunk/EBM/heavy metal band

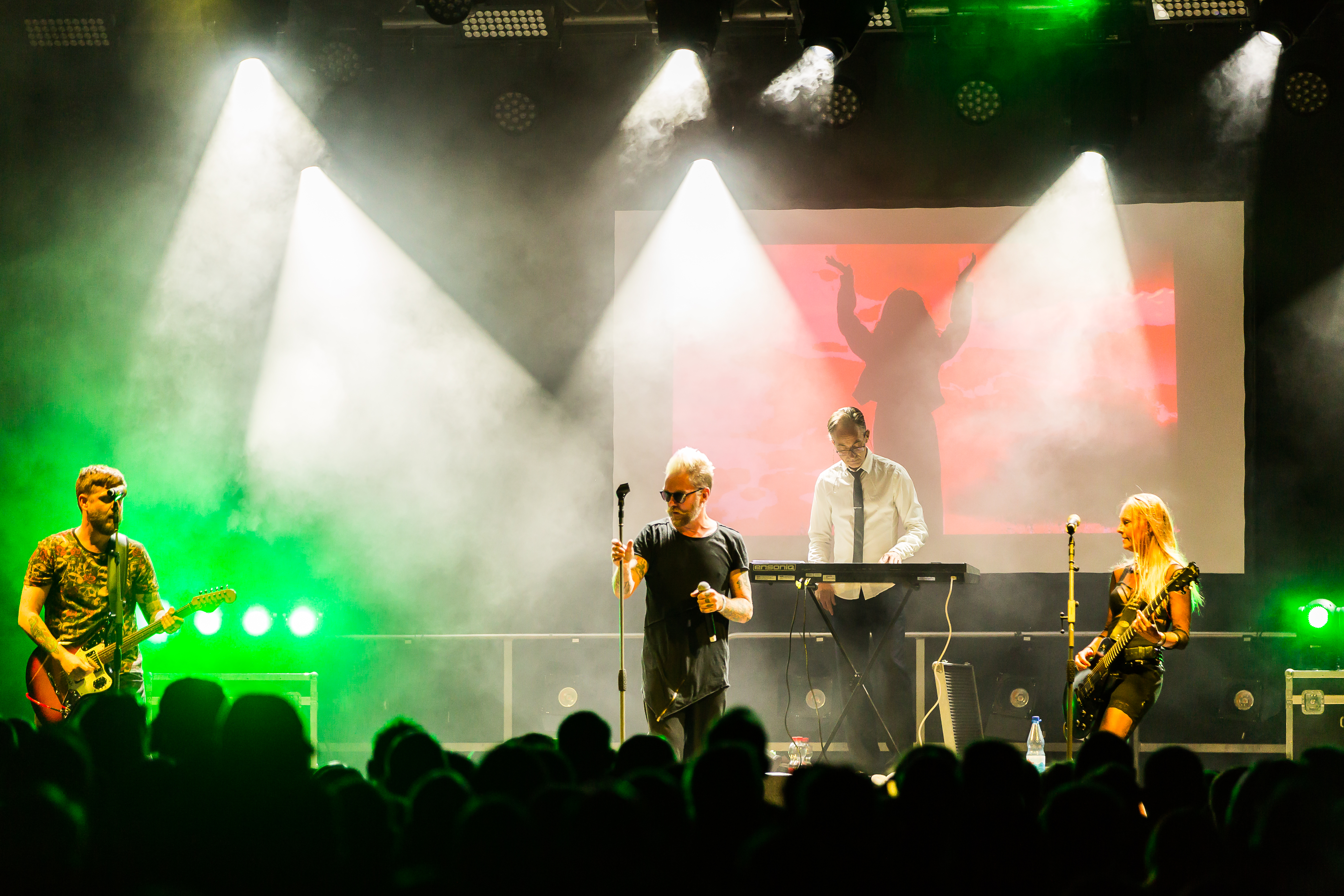
- Cat Rapes Dog at Nocturnal Culture Night 15 2022

Background information
- Origin: Sweden
- Genres: Electropunk, EBM, industrial, heavy metal
- Years active: 1984–2009, 2019–present
- Members: Magnus Fransson; Annelie Bertilsson; Jonas Awertoft; John Wreibo Lindqwister
- Past members: Joel Rydström; Laszlo Hago

Cat Rapes Dog is a Swedish electropunk, EBM and heavy metal band, formed in 1984 by Joel Rydström and Magnus Fransson.

Initially the band self-released a number of albums on cassette, (then a trend followed by many independent acts of their type), plus a cassette album & vinyl singles on Swedish label Front Music Production.

Between 1989 and 1991 Cat Rapes Dog released three studio albums on KK Records, a Belgian independent label specialising in new beat, EBM and industrial acts (such as Front Line Assembly or Vomito Negro) that released over 300 titles between 1987 and 1996. Multiple Cat Rapes Dog albums were later released on Swedish independent labels Energy Rekords (Die Krupps, VNV Nation, Front 242, etc.) and Subspace Communications (Covenant, Apoptygma Berzerk, etc.) and on Artoffact Records of Toronto, Canada in 2013. Additional retrospective compilations have also been released by the above mentioned labels.

== Discography ==
=== Albums ===
- Cat Rapes Dog (1986, MC)
- Nekronomikon (1987, MC)
- Property Produces Bodily Injury (1987, MC)
- Maximum Overdrive (1989)
- God, Guns & Gasoline (1990)
- Superluminal (1991)
- Schizophrenia (1993)
- Moosehair Underwear (1993)
- Biodegradable (1995)
- Fuck Nature (1995)
- More Than You Bargained For (1995)
- The Secrets of God (1998)
- People As Prey (1999)
- Life Was Sweet (2013)
- American Dream (2020)

=== Singles and EPs ===
- Columna Vertebralis (1989)
- Down & Out (1998)
- American Dream 7" (1990)
- Chuckahomo Bridge 12" (1990)
- Fundamental 12" (1990)
- Madman / True Love 7" (1990)
- I Sometimes Wish I Was Famous (1991) (A Swedish Depeche Mode cover album: CRD collaborates with one track: "Something to Do" in which they altered some of the lyrics.)
- The Banzai Beats (1991)
- Superluminal (1991)
- Trojan Whores (1992)
- Moosewear (1993)
- Nej till EU (1994)
- Sucking Dry (1994)
- Motörhead Tribute (1995) (A Scandinavian Motörhead cover album: CRD collaborates with "Deaf Forever".)
- Motorman (1998)
- Workers of The World (1998)
- Miaow at the Moon (2003)
