= Vomito Negro (band) =

Belgian band

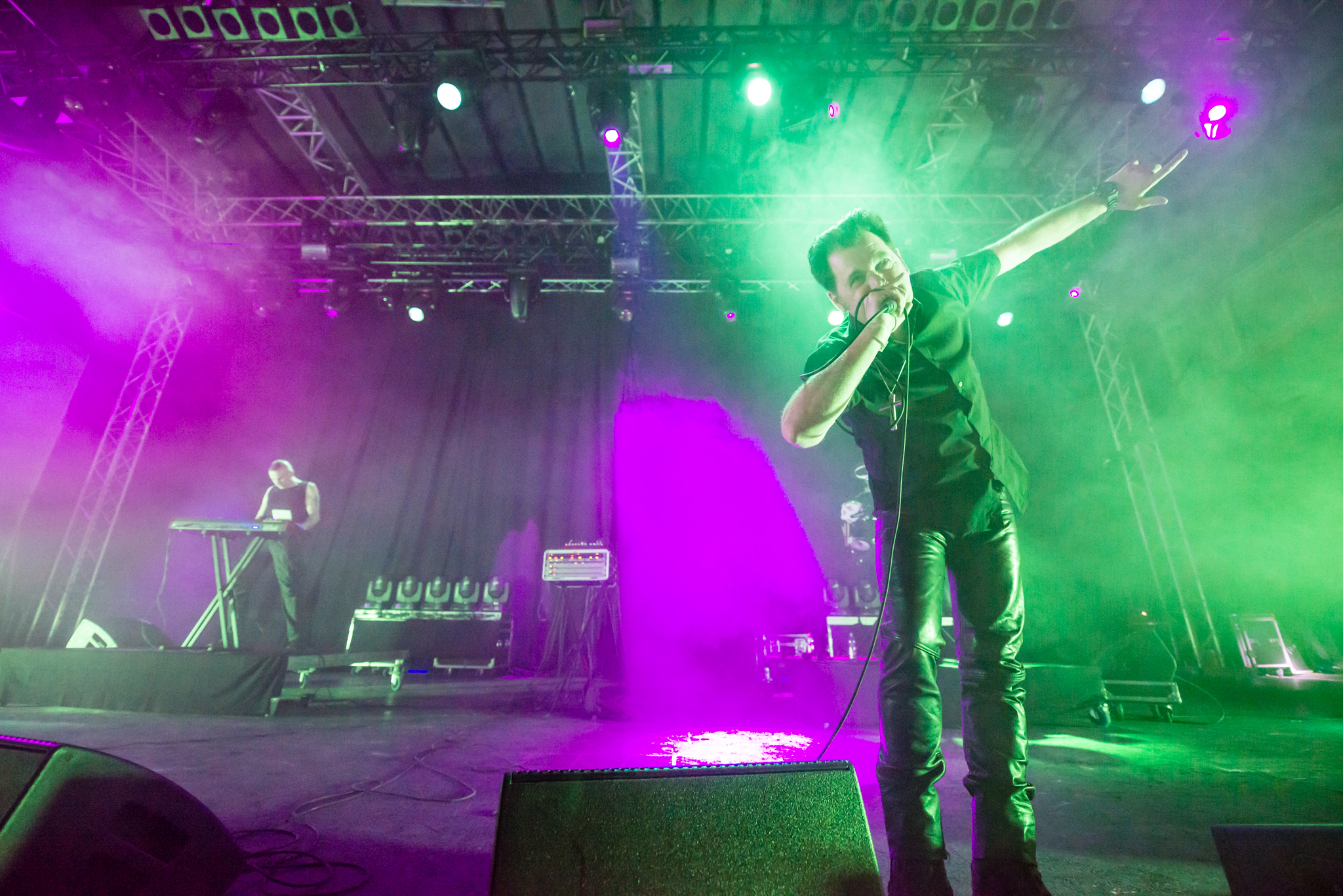
- Vomito Negro at E-Tropolis 2015

Background information
- Origin: Belgium
- Genres: EBM; electro-industrial; ambient
- Years active: 1983–present
- Labels: Out Of Line; KK; Antler-Subway; Metropolis; EK Product; Scanner
- Spinoffs: Full Dynamic Range; Pressure Control
- Members: Gin Devo; Sven Kadanza
- Past members: BORG; Guy Van Mieghem; Gina Van Mieghem; Eric Van Wonterghem; Mario Vaerewijck; Peter Van Bogaert; Samdevos; Pieter NTRSN; Hans Weyers; Peter Moreels
- Website: www.vomitonegro.com

Vomito Negro is a Belgian electronic band formed in 1983. The name is Spanish and Portuguese for "black vomit", a phenomenon that arises in the last stage of the disease yellow fever.

== History ==
Guy Van Mieghem and Gin Devo were familiar with each other in the early eighties when Van Mieghem was involved in an obscure punk/new wave band. Circa 1983, after Van Mieghem was released from a stint in prison, Devo suggested that they work together musically towards the new EBM style.

After releasing a self-titled EP in 1985, the duo signed with the Belgian KK Records label where they released their debut album, Dare. This was followed by Shock and Human (The Cross on Nature's Back). During this time the band worked with Liquid G. (a.k.a. Peter von Bogaert) on the collaboration Musical Art Conjunct of Sound. After Human the band left KK Records to join Antler-Subway Records, where they released The New Drug and Wake Up.

Wake Up marked a slight departure in the band's already unusual EBM style, with a heavy emphasis on subjects such as humanism and environmental protection, the latter owing somewhat to Van Mieghem's participation with Greenpeace.

The early nineties brought several side projects into being, spawned from relationships formed at KK Records and the band's "VZW The Soundfactory" studio. Van Mieghem paired with former Klinik vocalist Dirk Ivens as Blok 57, which signed to Germany's Zoth Ommog Records. In 1993, Van Mieghem and Devo joined with Gerry Kenny (a.k.a. Minister of Noise) and Dimitri van Elsen to form Full Dynamic Range, a project that was more musically ambient and "calm" than Vomito Negro.

In 1993, Van Mieghem suffered a car accident at the end of their European tour, resulting in his left arm and hand being severely injured and his being unable to participate in making music for almost three years. Devo, meanwhile, spent some of this time assisting fellow Belgian bands Dive and Insekt on their European and US tours. The hiatus was extended further when Van Mieghem purchased and renovated a house, including rebuilding the band's studio.

Discontent with the result of their studio album Fireball in 2002, Gin Devo decided to put Vomito Negro aside for a while and to invest all his energy and creativity in his new project called Pressure Control and released the debut album Vamp. After only two more concerts Guy Van Mieghem sold his studio equipment and stopped all musical activities. In 2008 Gin decided to bring back Vomito Negro. After asking BORG, who already was a member of Gin Devo's side project Pressure Control, to join the band. While they successfully toured Europe from 2008 until 2009, the duo started working on the new album.

On January 22, 2010, the band released Skull & Bones through Out of Line Records. Some of these new tracks like "Black Tie, White Shirt" and "Darkmoon" were already tested on the crowd of the WGT Festival, in Leipzig and the Bimfest in Antwerp.

In February 2010, just after its release, Skull & Bones entered the German Alternative Charts (DAC) on the tenth position, only to climb further up to the second position one week later. Meanwhile, the remake version of their club classic "Move Your Body (V2K10)", which is featured on the bonus disc of the limited-edition version, entered the DAC's single charts and reaching 13th place.

In January 2013, the band released the album Fall of an Empire.

== Discography ==
- Vomito Negro (EP, 1985)
- Dare (LP, 1987)
- Stay Alive (12", 1987)
- Musical Art Conjunct of Sound (with Liquid G., LP, 1989)
- Shock (LP, 1989)
- Human (The Cross on Nature's Back) (LP, 1990)
- Save the World (12", 1990)
- The New Drug (LP, 1991)
- Compiled (Comp, 1992)
- Wake Up (LP, 1992)
- Fireball (LP, 2002)
- Skull & Bones (LP, 2010)
- Slave Nation (EP, 2011)
- Fall of an Empire (LP, 2013)
- Death Sun (LP, 2014)
- Black Plague (LP, 2017)
