= Electronic body music =

Music genre

EBM
- Other names: Industrial dance, Aggrepo
- Stylistic origins: Industrial; synth-punk; post-punk; synth-pop; krautrock; Berlin school; electro; disco
- Cultural origins: Early 1980s, Western Europe (West Germany, Belgium, Netherlands)
- Derivative forms: New beat; electro-industrial; big beat; dark electro; techno; hardcore; goa trance; futurepop

Fusion genres
- Industrial metal

Other topics
- Cyberpunk; rivethead

Electronic body music (EBM) is a genre of electronic music that combines elements of industrial music and synth-punk with elements of dance music. It developed in the early 1980s in Western Europe, as an outgrowth of both the punk and the industrial music cultures. It combines sequenced repetitive basslines, programmed disco rhythms, and mostly undistorted vocals and command-like shouts with confrontational or provocative themes.

The evolution of the genre reflected "a general shift towards more song-oriented structures in industrial as to a general turn towards the dancefloor by many musicians and genres in the era of post-punk." It was considered a part of the European new wave and post-punk movement and the first style that blended synthesized sounds with an ecstatic style of dancing (e.g. pogo).

EBM gained a stable following in the second half of the 1980s. Around that period, a youth-cultural scene emerged from EBM whose followers describe themselves as EBM-heads or (in North America) as rivetheads.

== Etymology ==
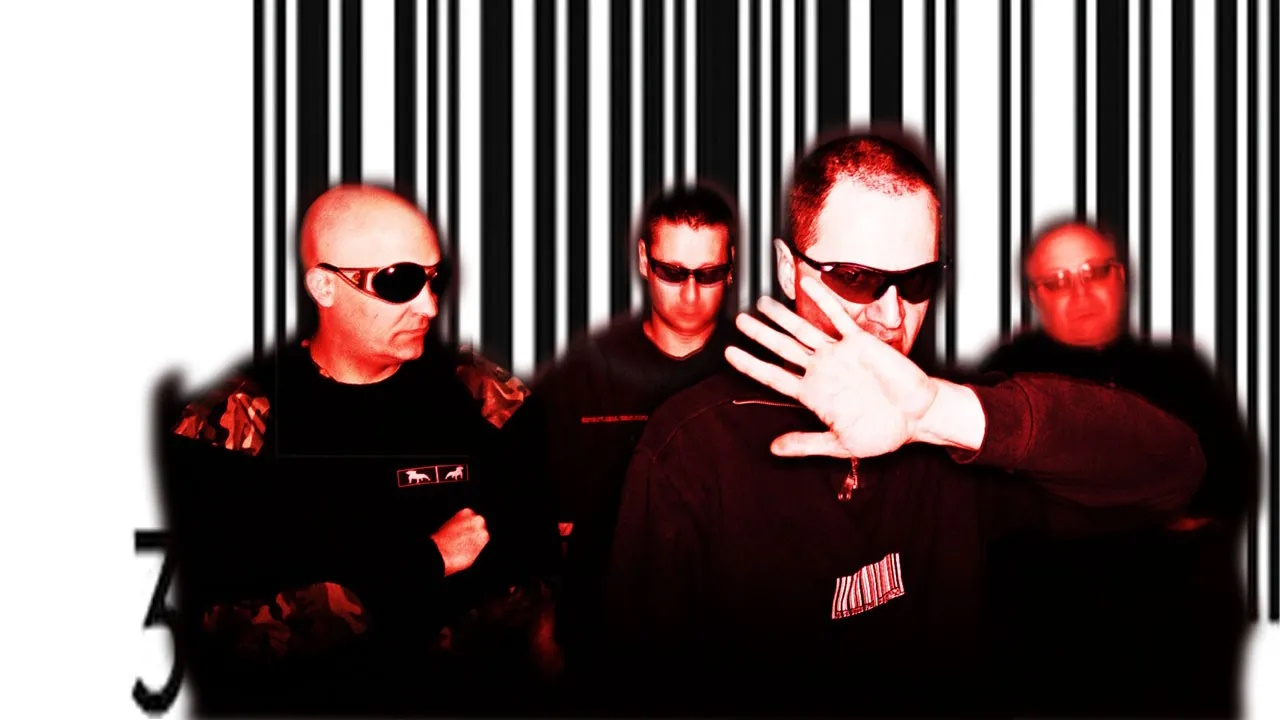
Belgian EBM group Front 242.

The term electronic body music was first used by Ralf Hütter of the German electronic band Kraftwerk in an interview with British music newspaper Sounds in November 1977. In June 1978 Hütter reused the phrase in an interview with WKSU radio (Kent, Ohio) to explain the more physical character of the Kraftwerk album The Man-Machine. Although the term originated in the late 1970s, it was not until the 1980s when it reappeared and started to come into popular use.

EBM stands for 'electronic body music', a term which only really came into use when the Brits and Belgians stepped into the 'sequencer business' with bands like Nitzer Ebb and Front 242. There you could find that sound again, where it was catchily picked up and labelled. In our days all these terms didn't exist, not 'industrial' nor 'post-punk'. [...] To us it was sequencer music, that was what we did.

— Jürgen Engler of Die Krupps

In 1981, DAF from Germany employed the term "Körpermusik" (body music) to describe their danceable electronic punk sound. The term "electronic body music" was later used by Belgian band Front 242 in 1984 to describe the music of their EP of that year titled No Comment; in the documentary Industrial Accident: The Story of Wax Trax! Records, Jean-Luc De Meyer explained that the band tried to have a more distinct, aggressive stage presence as opposed to what they perceived as the "stiff" electronic acts who stood still behind their keyboards: "We're doing electronic music, but it's also talking to the body."

== Characteristics ==
Described as an outgrowth of "electronically generated punk [music] intertwined with industrial sounds," EBM has been characterized as a composite of programmed drum beats, repetitive basslines, and clear or slightly distorted vocals, instructional shouts or growls complemented with reverberation and echo effects. Typical EBM rhythms rely on the 4/4 disco beat or rock-oriented backbeats, (featuring kick drum, snare and hi-hat) and some minor syncopation.

Environmental samples, e.g. hammer blow, machine and alert sounds, are often used to create a "factory ambiance". Other samples include political speeches and excerpts from science fiction movies, cf. Front 242 – Funkahdafi.

== History ==
=== Precursors ===
EBM evolved from a combination of post-punk, industrial and post-industrial music sources, including The Normal, Suicide, DAF, Die Krupps, Killing Joke, Cabaret Voltaire, Throbbing Gristle and Test Dept. but also krautrock and Berlin school artists such as Kraftwerk and Tangerine Dream (who had used electronic bass sequences as a basic feature in their productions).

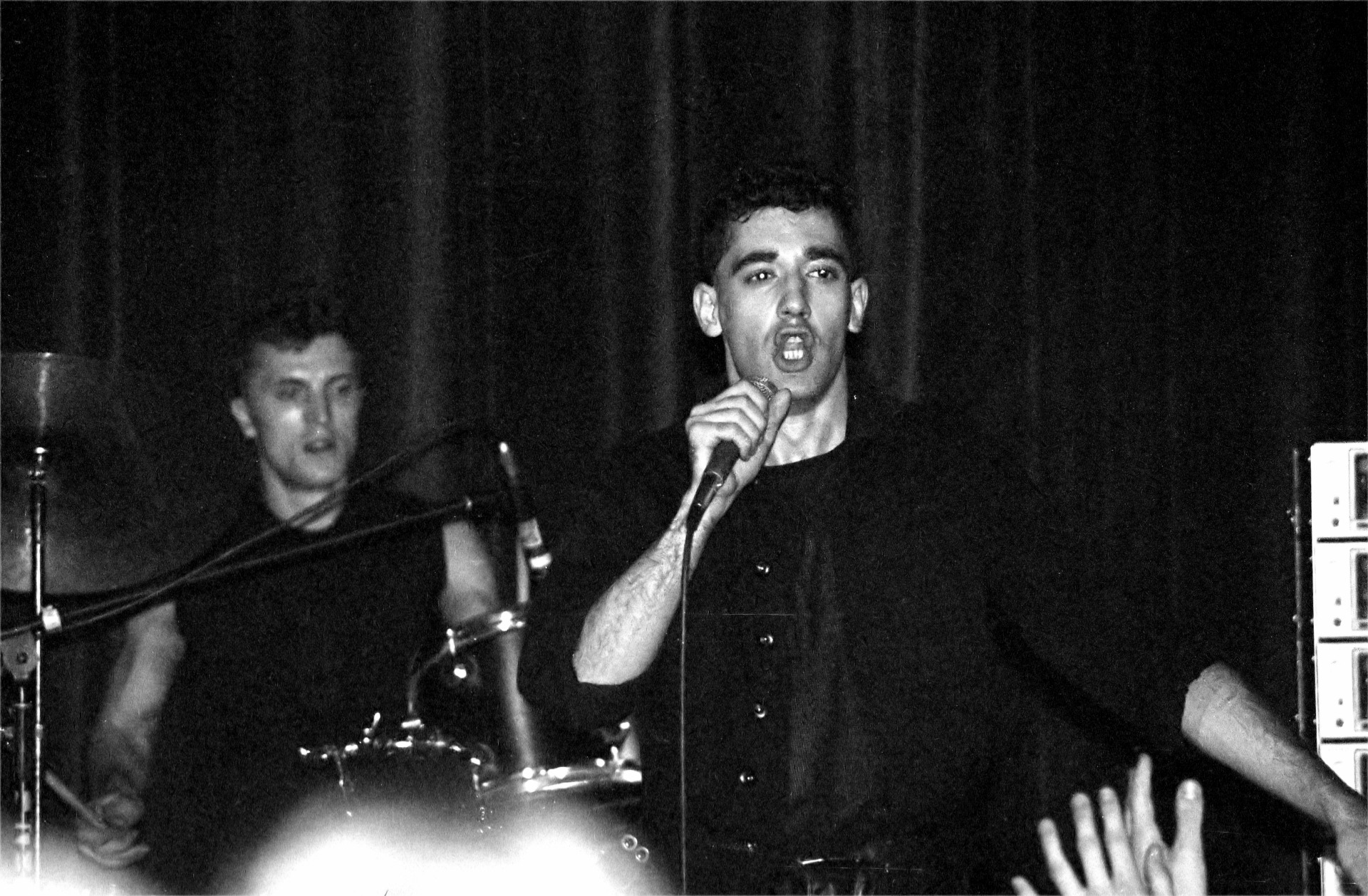
German proto-EBM band DAF created the "muscles & machines" image – the basic concept of electronic body music.

The song "Warm Leatherette" (The Normal, 1978) stands at the beginning of an important development, the electrified version of Punk that had been picked up and transformed in Düsseldorf by bands like Die Krupps, DAF and Liaisons Dangereuses, music that might be called proto-EBM at least. [...] The role of sequencers, synthesizer and drum machine sounds for the creative process itself and its results are another interesting point concerning EBM. The use of these instruments contributed obviously to the formation of danceable grooves and sound textures that attracted a wider audience.

— Timor Kaul, German musicologist and cultural historian

Other influences include the synth-pop music of The Human League and Fad Gadget; and the krautrock-inspired dance hit "I Feel Love" by Giorgio Moroder and Donna Summer. Daniel Bressanutti (Front 242), who helped establish the term EBM, named the soundscapes of Tangerine Dream and Klaus Schulze as additional influences along Kraftwerk, Throbbing Gristle, the sequencer-based electro-disco of Giorgio Moroder, and the punk movement.

=== 1981–1987 ===
Emerging in the early 1980s in Germany and Belgium, bands such as DAF, Die Krupps, Liaisons Dangereuses, and Front 242 started to blend danceable rhythms and repetitive sequencer lines. At the time the genre arose, style-defining synthesizers included Korg MS-20, Roland SH-101, ARP Odyssey, Emulator II, along with several Oberheim and Yamaha models.

Archetypical songs are Verschwende deine Jugend, Alle gegen alle and Der Mussolini by DAF; Wahre Arbeit, wahrer Lohn, Goldfinger and Für einen Augenblick by Die Krupps; Etre assis ou danser, Los niños del parque and Avant-après mars by Liaisons Dangereuses, and Body to Body, U-Men and He Runs Too Fast for Us by Front 242.

Front 242 characterized their approach as somewhere between Throbbing Gristle and Kraftwerk. Nitzer Ebb and Portion Control, influenced by DAF and Cabaret Voltaire, followed soon after. Groups from this era often applied socialist realist aesthetics, with ironic intent. Other prominent artists were Pankow, Vomito Negro, Borghesia, The Neon Judgement, à;GRUMH..., A Split-Second, The Klinik, and Signal Aout 42.

=== 1988–1993 ===
In the second half of the 1980s, the genre became popular in Canada (Front Line Assembly) and the U.S. (Ministry, Revolting Cocks, Schnitt Acht) as well as in Sweden (Inside Treatment, Pouppée Fabrikk, Cat Rapes Dog) and Japan (2nd Communication, DRP, Soft Ballet). North American bands started to use EBM-typical bass sequences and combined them with the roughness of (hardcore) punk and thrash metal (cf. industrial metal). Nine Inch Nails continued the cross-pollination between EBM and rock music resulting in the album Pretty Hate Machine (1989).

Meanwhile, EBM became successful in the underground club scene, particularly in Europe. In this period the most important labels were the Belgian Play It Again Sam and Antler-Subway, the German Zoth Ommog, the North American Wax Trax! and the Swedish Energy Rekords. Notable acts at that time included And One, Armageddon Dildos, Bigod 20, Insekt, Scapa Flow, Orange Sector, Paranoid, and Electro Assassin.

Between the early and mid-1990s, many EBM artists ceased activities or changed their musical direction, incorporating more elements of rock, heavy metal and electronica. The album 06:21:03:11 Up Evil by Front 242 initiated the end of the EBM era of the 1980s. Nitzer Ebb, one of the most important purveyors of the genre, turned into an alternative rock band. Without the strength of its figureheads, electronic body music as a discernable music style faded by the mid-1990s.

=== Revival ===
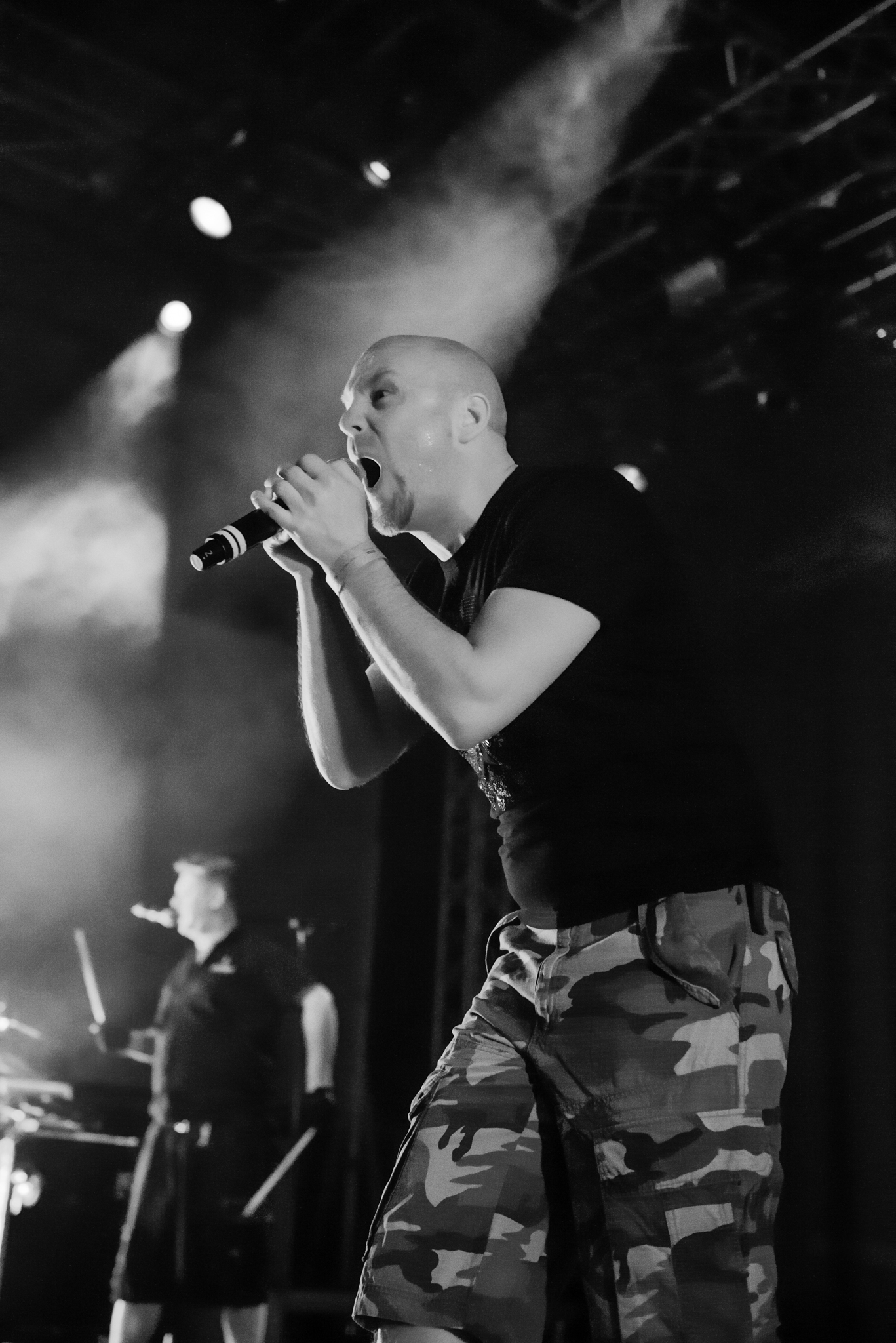
Spetsnaz live at E-tropolis festival, Oberhausen, 2015.

In the late 1990s and after the millennium, Belgian, Swedish and German artists such as Ionic Vision, Machine Command, Tyske Ludder, and Spetsnaz had reactivated the style. Based on this revival, Sweden and East Germany then became the centre of the movement spawning a variety of newcomers. Primarily as a counteracting force against the expanding futurepop scene, these artists followed a neo-traditionalistic path, often referred to as "old school EBM".

Simultaneously, a number of European techno producers started incorporating elements of EBM into their sound. This tendency grew in parallel with the emerging electroclash scene and, as that scene started to decline, artists partly associated with it, such as The Hacker, DJ Hell, Green Velvet, Black Strobe, and David Carretta, moved towards this techno/EBM crossover style.

There has been increasing convergence between this scene and the old school EBM scene. Some artists have remixed each other. Most notably, Terence Fixmer joined with Nitzer Ebb's Douglas McCarthy to form Fixmer/McCarthy.

== Aesthetics ==
EBM follows the transgressive approach of punk and industrial music (e.g. "demystification of symbols") and the use of provocative extreme imagery is common (e.g. Nazi paraphernalia; reminiscent of punk's use of the swastika). Appropriating totalitarian, Socialist and Fascist references, symbols, and signifiers has been a recurring topic of debate between fans and outsiders to the genre alike due to its stylistical ambiguity that stems from industrial music's contrarian nature. In one instance, military-themed band Laibach "ma[de] no attempt to subvert this image [so] it has the aura of authenticity" so "[m]any Laibach fans began to revel in the evils of the band and to take their stage act at face value."

Hammer and Cogwheel: Working class aesthetic as a part of EBM iconography.

Bon and Doug were heavily influenced by DAF, Test Dept. and Einstürzende Neubauten. Hand in hand with the music was the image which unashamedly borrowed a lot from German and Soviet imagery. We all loved the sharp and striking design images of Russian and German '30s and '40s posters and artwork. Obviously we faced a lot of questions and objections about the ‚Neo-Nazi' image. But really we were just using the images to get people to sit up and listen. ‚Iconoclastic minimalism' was one phrase that was used to describe Nitzer Ebb at the time.

— Chris Piper, manager of Nitzer Ebb

The military style of EBM has a "part-human part-machine" gestalt typical of transhumanist or cyberpunk movements. EBM asserts a hyper-masculine image of "triumphalism, combat postures, and paranoia," and is known for its "tough-guy" or machismo attitudes displayed by both men and women. According to Gabi Delgado-López of Deutsch Amerikanische Freundschaft, the duo who adopted an aesthetic of black leather and military paraphernalia in the early 1980s was inspired by the male homosexual sado-masochistic scene and is not meant to represent "machismo ideology" but part of a "role."

== Derivatives and alternative terms ==
=== Electro-industrial ===
Electro-industrial is an outgrowth of the EBM and industrial music that developed in the mid-1980s. While EBM has minimal structures and a clean production, electro-industrial draws on deep, complex and layered sounds, incorporating elements of ambient industrial. Electro-industrial was pioneered by Skinny Puppy, Numb and Mentallo & The Fixer. In the early 1990s, the style spawned the dark electro genre and, in the end of the decade, a strongly techno- and hard-trance-inspired style called "hellektro" or "aggrotech."

=== Industrial dance ===
Industrial dance is a North American umbrella term for electronic body music and electro-industrial music. Fans associated with these genres call themselves rivetheads.

In general, industrial dance is characterized by its "electronic beats, symphonic keyboard lines, pile-driver rhythms, angst-ridden or sampled vocals, and cyberpunk imagery".

Since the mid-1980s, the term industrial dance has been used to describe the music of Cabaret Voltaire (early 1980s), early Die Krupps, Portion Control, The Neon Judgement, Clock DVA, Nitzer Ebb, KMFDM, Skinny Puppy, Front Line Assembly, Front 242, Ministry, Nine Inch Nails, Manufacture, Yeht Mae, My Life with the Thrill Kill Kult, Leæther Strip and early Spahn Ranch. In March 1989, Spin Magazine presented a two-paged special report about the industrial dance movement in Canada and the U.S.

== See also ==
- Computational musicology
- Gospel music
- List of electronic music genres
- List of industrial music festivals
- Post-industrial developments
- Remix
- Electronic dance music (EDM)
- Rock music
- Soul music
