= Vinyl on Demand =

German record label

- Founded: 2003
- Founder: Frank Maier
- Genre: Electronic, industrial, ambient
- Country of origin: Germany
- Location: Friedrichshafen
- Official website: vinyl-on-demand.com

Vinyl on Demand is a record label that targets vinyl collectors of 1970s and 80s minimal synth, industrial and avant-garde music. Along with sales to distributors, Vinyl on Demand provides a subscription service. Most releases are limited to 500 copies and between subscribers and distributors they often sell out.

== History ==
Vinyl on Demand was founded in 2003 by Frank Maier. Maier is a record collector and archivist whose focus has always been on early minimal synth, drone and industrial recordings of the late 1970s and early 1980s, particularly obscure cassette recordings. Initially, Vinyl on Demand focused on German releases by artists such as Die Tödliche Doris, Hermann Kopp and Mutter. Over the years, its catalog has grown to feature recordings of other late 1970s and early 1980s by musicians such as John Duncan, Clair Obscur, Current 93, The Legendary Pink Dots, SPK, Nurse with Wound, Psychic TV, Asmus Tietchens, Conrad Schnitzler, Merzbow and Stratis.

Initially, Vinyl on Demand's purpose was to re-release on vinyl many of the limited edition cassettes in Maier's collection, but as time passed the reissues became deluxe box sets with material from cassettes as well as unreleased material. Early on, Vinyl on Demand began selling yearly subscriptions to collectors, often providing extras exclusively for subscribers.

== Sublabels ==
Pripuzzi – Releases new minimal electronics and avant-garde projects.
VinylOverDose-Records – Releases up and coming artists.
VOD Publishing – An online and print publication. A catalog of noise/industrial music and record pricing guide.

== Discography ==
Year	Title	Format & special notes
2004	Strudelsölle	6xLP + Boxset by Die Tödliche Doris. Limited to 250 copies for members of the VOD-Club, 66 boxes for non-members and 6 x 184 regular single Lps for common distribution & sale. Catalog no. VOD 1B. Each LP was sold separately VOD 1.1, VOD 1.2, VOD 1.3, VOD 1.4, VOD 1.5, VOD 1.6
2004	Japgirls In Synthesis	LP by Hermann Kopp. Limited to 500 copies. Catalog no. VOD 2
2004	Kontinuität der Befindlichkeiten – Minimal Electronic 1981–1983	LP by Various Artist. Limited to 500 copies. Catalog no. VOD 3
2004	15 Tracks For Unknown People 1980–84	2XLP Boxset by Head Resonance Company/Peter Pixel. Limited to 500 copies. Catalog no. VOD 4
2004	CD Des Monats / Filmusik	2XLP Boxset by Mutter / Max Müller. Limited to 500 copies. Catalog no. VOD 5
2004	CD Des Monats	File, MP3 by Mutter. Catalog no. VOD 5
2004	First Live Performance	LP by The New Blockaders. Originally released together with Changez Les Blockeurs as part of a 2xLP box set, has since been released as a single LP. Catalog no. VOD 6
2004	Changez Les Blockeurs	LP by The New Blockaders. Limited to 500 copies. Catalog no. VOD 6
2004	Changez Les Blockeurs (21st Anniversary Edition)	2xLP Boxset by The New Blockaders. Limited to 500 copies. Catalog no. VOD 6B
2004	Fallersleben	12" by Die Tödliche Doris. Limited edition of 500 pcs. 250 copies have an additional poster, signed by Wolfgang Müller. Catalog no. VOD 7.
2004	Wunderschöne Rückkoppelungen	LP by Frieder Butzmann. Limited to 500 hand-numbered copies. Catalog no. VOD 8.
2004	Exil-System 1979–2004 (Comp)	LP by Various. 23 Handmade copies were made. Limited to 500 hand-numbered copies. Catalog no. VOD 9.
2004	Inventaire & Contradictions – Retrospective 1982–1988	LP by Das Synthetische Mischgewebe. Limited to 500 copies. Catalog no. VOD 10.
2004	Early Recordings	LP by Sprung Aus Den Wolken. Limited to 500 copies. Catalog no. VOD 11.
2004	Ohne Untertitel	7" by O.U.T. Limited edition of 200 copies. Catalog no. VOD 11S.
2004	Rare & Lost Into The Future	7" by S.Y.P.H. Limited to 500 copies. Catalog no. VOD 12.
2004	Live 1983	DVDr by Head Resonance Company. Limited Edition of 200 copies for members of Vinyl-On-Demand. Jewel case with DVDr, stuck on an LP-cover by VOD (with imprinted logo). Additional small innersleeve. Catalog no. VOD DVD 1.
2004	Stigfinnareträffande II / Zwei Herzen	7" by Die Tödliche Doris. Limited to 500 copies. Christmas-gift of VOD. Catalog no. VOD XMAS 04.
2005	Ungehörtes Unerhörtes	Promo CDr (with full-colour artwork) housed in slim case with insert. By Kosmonautentraum. No catalog number.
2005	Ogre-Sse	LP By Non Toxique Lost. Limited edition of 500 copies. First 250 copies with 16-sided "Handbook of fun". Catalog number VOD 13.
2005	Mondo Carnale – Best Of 1981–1989	LP By Hermann Kopp. Limited edition of 500 copies. Catalog number VOD 14.
2005	Unterhaltung	LP By Tass 2. Limited edition of 500 copies. Catalog number VOD 15.
2005	Second Offender	LP By P1/E. Limited to 500 hand-numbered copies, some with extra pin. Catalog number VOD 16.
2005	Don't Tell Me Stories	LP By Die Unbekannten. Limited edition of 500 copies. 50 more copies were made with white labels. Catalog number VOD 17.
2005	Wahrnehmungen 1980/1981	3xLP, Ltd + 7" + box set By Various. Limited edition of 500 pieces. 250 of those contain a bonus 7"-single with two unreleased tracks by P16.D4. Catalog number VOD 18B.
2005	Welten – Worlds – Ohontsa'shón:'a Morphologische Modemusik	LP By Die Tödliche Doris. Limited Edition of 500 copies. Catalog number VOD 19.
2005	Ungehörtes Unerhörtes	LP By Kosmonautentraum. Limited Edition of 500 copies. Catalog number VOD 20.
2005	Weil Das System Nicht Funktioniert!	LP By Saal 2. Limited Edition of 500 copies. Catalog number VOD 21.
2005	Die Grosse Untergangsshow – Festival Genialer Dilletanten – Berlin Tempodrom, 4. September 1981	CD + DVD + box set by Various. There exist two different packages, both limited editions of 500 hand numbered copies Catalog number VOD 22 & VOD 22B.
2005	Dreams (Early Recordings 1980–82)	LP by No More. Limited Edition of 500 copies. Catalog number VOD 23.
2006	Viva Negativa! - A Tribute To The New Blockaders Volume I	4xLP, Comp + 7" + box set by Various. Limited Edition of 500 copies. 250 came with a 7" single. Catalog number VOD 24.
2006	Viva Negativa! - A Tribute To The New Blockaders Volume I	4xLP, Comp box set by Various. Pressed in an edition of 500 hand numbered copies. The edition for the participating artists is unnumbered. Some of those editions came with the members 7" which was available for the Volume I box set. Catalog number VOD 25.
2006	Viva Negativa! - A Tribute To The New Blockaders Volume II	LP, As 25 copies of the VOD25 boxes were damaged those records are available as single releases. Catalog number VOD 25.1, VOD 25.2, VOD 25.3, VOD 25.4.
2006	Archives	5xLP + 7" + box set by M.B. Limited edition of 500 copies, of which 250 copies came with a bonus 7" Catalog number VOD 26B.
2006	Untitled	3xLP + 7" + box set, Promo by Esplendor Geométrico. Limited edition of 500 hand numbered copies in luxurious box with each LP housed in its own sleeve. Also a Limited Edition of 250 for members of the VOD-Club, included to the VOD 27-Box Set. And a special promo edition of 23 copies with handmade Box. Catalog number VOD 27.
2006	Untitled	2xLP + DVD + Box set by Hijokaidan. Limited to 500 numbered copies. Also a Limited Edition of 250 for members of the VOD-Club. Catalog number VOD 28 & VOD 28M.
2006	1914	2xLP by Campingsex. Limited to 500 numbered copies. Catalog number VOD 29.
2006	The Absence Of A Canary V1.1	2xLP by Ceramic Hello. This is limited to 500 hand numbered copies. Catalog number VOD 30.
2006	Complete Oblique	2xLP by E.g. Oblique Graph. This is limited to 500 hand numbered copies. Catalog number VOD 31.
2006	Snatch Paste – An Assortment Of Snatch Tapes	LP by Various. This is limited to 500 copies. Catalog number VOD 32.
2006	First Recordings 1978–1985	LP by John Duncan. Limited numbered edition of 500 copies. There also exists a limited edition of 50 numbered copies in a red Box Set with golden imprints instead of the black Box Set with black. Catalog number VOD 33.
2006	Early Recordings 79-83	2xLP by Ptôse. This is limited to 500 hand numbered copies. Catalog number VOD 34.
2006	A Skeleton/Cupboard Situation	LP + 7" by Colin Potter. This is limited to 500 hand numbered copies. 250 copies came with an additional bonus 7", 250 copies without the 7".Catalog number VOD 35.
2006	Cassettencombinat West-Berlin 1980–81	3xLP, Comp + 7", EP + box set by Various. This is limited to 500 hand numbered copies. 250 copies came with an additional bonus 7", 250 copies without the 7".Catalog number VOD 36.
2007	Tapes 81-89	5xLP, Ltd, Whi + 7", Ltd + box set by Absolute Body Control. Limited numbered edition of 600 copies, 370 copies with bonus 7", 230 without bonus 7". .Catalog number VOD 37-B.
2007	Evidences Vol.1 – Final Industrial Music 1980	5xLP by M.B. Limited edition of 600 numbered copies. There also exists a limited edition of 50 numbered copies in a red Box Set with golden imprints instead of the black Box Set with silver. Catalog number VOD 38.
2007	Broken Flag: A Retrospective 1982–1985	5xLP by Various. Limited edition of 250 numbered copies. Comes in printed satchel with standard box set, T-shirt, trouser braces, booklet, exclusive 7" and 2 x dog tags. Second edition came without the extra's and black and white cover. Catalog number VOD 39.
2007	4K7	4xLP, Ltd, Whi + box set by Asmus Tietchens. Limited numbered edition of 600 copies. Members of the Vinyl-On-Demand subscription service received this with a bonus 7". (catalog VOD 40.S) Catalog number VOD 40.B.
2007	Musik Hinter Glas	7" by Asmus Tietchens. Limited edition of 250 numbered copies. This record is not available separately, but was enclosed as a bonus for all members of the vinyl-on-demand subscription service in the Asmus Tietchens 4K7 box set. Catalog number VOD 40.S.
2007	Musik Unter Tage	LP by Asmus Tietchens. This comes as a white vinyl LP packaged in a white inner sleeve without individual outer sleeve. This record had been re-pressed, due to a pressing blemish at side one of the original album included in the Vinyl-On-Demand box '4K7' from Asmus Tietchens, and had been sent to some customers as a replacement. Catalog number VOD 40 LP IV.
2007	C.O.I.T. - A Collection Of Isolated Tracks 1981–1988	2xLP + 7" by Clair Obscur. Limited edition of 600 numbered copies. There is also three alternate versions of this release. The main release does not contain the single. Catalog number VOD 41.
2007	Early Recordings 77-83	LP by GRAF+ZYX. Limited edition of 600 numbered copies. Catalog number VOD 42.
2007	The Naughtiest Girl Was A Monitor	LP by The Naughtiest Girl Was A Monitor. Limited edition of 600 numbered copies. Catalog number VOD 43.
2007	Supplementary Benefit	LP by Storm Bugs. Limited edition of 600 numbered copies. Catalog number VOD 44.
2007	Press My Hungry Button	LP by Cultural Amnesia. Limited edition of 600 numbered copies. Subscribers edition with bonus 7" limited to 250 copies. Catalog number VOD 45.
2007	Press My Hungry Button	7", S/Sided by Weltklang. Limited to 333 copies. Catalog number VOD 1980.
2007	Press My Hungry Button	3xLP, Comp + 7", box set by Esplendor Geometrico. Limited hand numbered edition of 600 copies. 50 copies were done in red box. Catalog number VOD 46.
2007	Songs From A Sewer Of Dreams	4xLP, Comp + 7" + box set by Controlled Bleeding. Limited numbered edition of 600 copies. Limited hand numbered edition of 250 copies only for members of the Vinyl-On-Demand subscription in 2007 including a flag. Catalog number 47B.
2007	The Legendary Pink Dots	5xLP, Comp + box set by The Legendary Pink Dots. Limited numbered edition of 600 copies. Limited friends edition of 50 copies in black box with silver embossement. Catalog number 48.
2008	Adenoids 1977–1985	5xLP, Comp + box set by Severed Heads. Limited numbered edition of 600 copies. This is the version limited to 77 copies is special laundry-bag. 55 of those are in red box with silver embossement, 22 in regular grey box. Catalog number VOD 49.
2008	Dokument III0 1979–1983	6xLP + 3x7" box set by S.P.K. Limited edition of 500 numbered copies, 300 numbered copies (number 501-800), comes in a black wooden box with T-shirt and booklet. Limited friends edition limited to 55 copies. Catalog number VOD 50.
2008	Prototype ----- Plus Garage Tracks	6xLP + 3x7" box set by Experimental Products. Regular edition of 600 copies. Subscribers edition with bonus 1982 demo 7" limited to 250 hand numbered copies. Catalog number VOD 51.
2008	Per Ignem Ad Lucem	2xLP, Comp + 7" + DVD box set by Gerechtigkeits Liga. Catalog number VOD 52.
2008	Tapes 1977–1983	6xLP, Comp, RM + DVD-V, PAL + box set by Etant Donnes. Limited hand-numbered edition of 600 copies. Also limited to 99 copies friends edition in white vinyl of which 66 copies come is special white leather-taped box-set. Catalog number VOD 53.
2008	1978–1988	3x10", Comp + 7", box set by ADN' Ckrystall. Comes in a silk-taped box-set in a limited edition of 600. Subscribers edition came with bonus 7" limited to 250 hand-numbered copies. Catalog number VOD 54.
2008	K7 Tapes Archives MCMLXXXIII-MCMLXXXVII	3xLP box set by Opera Multi Steel. Limited edition box set including an LP-sized booklet and a shirt for members of the VOD-club. Hand numbered. Catalog number VOD 55.
2008	Lest We Forget – Work In Progress 1979–1988	3xLP box set by Nocturnal Emissions. Limited Edition Box-Set of 600 Hand-numbered copies incl. LP-size Booklet and a Red vinyl 7 inch. Limited friends edition of 50 copies in red box with silver printing incl. LP-size Booklet and a 7 inch. Both LP's and 7" are clear vinyl. Catalog number VOD 56B.
2008	Decades	LP by We Be Echo. Limited edition of 600 hand numbered copies on high quality vinyl. Catalog number VOD 57.
2008	Face The Firing Squad	LP by Third Door From The Left. Limited edition release of 600. Catalog number VOD 58.
2008	Die Geburt Des Dionysos Christos	3xLP, RE + DVD box set by Hermann Nitsch. Limited Edition of 600. DVD limited to 400. Catalog number VOD 60.
2009	Tapes 81-89	5xLP box set by Absolute Body Control. Premium Deluxe Edition of 50 copies in wooden boxset with T-shirt and 12" records in white vinyl. 7" comes in black vinyl. Also contains an official certificate with your number on it. Catalog number VOD 37-B.
2009	Tapes 81-89	4xLP + 7" +box set by Bene Gesserit/Human Flesh/Pseudo Code/Subject/I Scream . Hand-numbered limited edition of 600 copies. Also available with a T-shirt. Catalog number VOD 59.
2009	Miscellany Deluxe (Souvenirs Perdus D'antan)	3xLP, Comp +box set by Andrew Liles. Hand-numbered limited edition of 600 copies. Catalog number VOD 61.
2009	Miscellany Deluxe (Souvenirs Perdus D'antan)	5xLP + 10" +box set by Various. Limited edition of 600 copies including a numbered certificate and a T-shirt. Catalog number VOD 62.
2009	Saison 1979–1982 (30 Years After)	4xLP, Comp + 10", Comp + box set by Polyphonic Size. Limited edition of 600 copies including a numbered certificate. Special edition of 99 copies in red vinyl. Catalog number VOD 63.
2009	Message From The Dead	LP by Norma Loy. Limited hand numbered edition of 600 copies. Catalog number VOD 64.
2009	1984–1986 [Testament Of Tape]	3xLP by VidnaObmana. VOD65, VOD65.1, VOD65.2, VOD65.3
2009	Flawed Existence	4xLP, Comp, Whi + 10", Whi + Hybrid, Sou + box set by Nurse With Wound. Limited edition release of 600. Catalog no. VOD66, VOD66.1, VOD66.2, VOD66.3, VOD66.4, VOD66.5.
2009	Crash Course In Science	3xLP, Comp + 7", Comp, Whi + box set by Crash Course In Science. Limited edition release of 600. VOD 67.
2009	The Early Tapes Period	3xLP + 10" + box set by Giancarlo Toniutti. Each record comes with its own cat no; VOD68.1, VOD68.2, VOD68.3 and VOD68.4.
2009	{Flowmotion Years – 1980–1982}	2xLP by Konstruktivists. Limited to 600 copies. Catalog number VOD69.
2010	I Am Not Artist (1973–1988)	6xLP + DVD-V, PAL, Reg + box set by Smegma. Catalog number VOD70.
2010	Chronology – The Bain Total Years 1.977-1.985	6xLP + 7" + box set by Die Form. Friends edition of 99 copies. Special artist edition of 29 copies with signed and numbered A4 print. Catalog number VOD71.
2010	Chronology – The Bain Total Years 1.977-1.985	4xLP + 7" + DVD-V + box set by O Yuki Conjugate. Limited edition of 600 copies. The DVD is only available in the members edition. Catalog number VOD72.
2010	Chronology – The Bain Total Years 1.977-1.985	4xLP + 7" + DVD-V + box set by Portion Control. Limited edition of 600 copies. The members' edition that includes the extra 7. 'Friends Edition' 7 Album Metal Box Set pressed on Orange Vinyl. Catalog number VOD73.
2010	Chronology – The Bain Total Years 1.977-1.985	4xLP, Ltd + 7"+ box set by Current 93. Four Record embossed wooden box with a metal clasp, limited to 600. Came in two editions. Catalog number VOD74, VOD74.5 and sold separately by LP as VOD74.1, VOD74.2.
2010	Unreleased Rarities, Out-takes, Rehearsals And Live 82-95	4xLP, Ltd + 7"+ box set by Current 93. Four Record embossed wooden box with a metal clasp, limited to 600. Came in two editions. Catalog number VOD74, VOD74.5 and sold separately by LP as VOD74.1, VOD74.2.
2010	Christ And The Pale Queens, Mighty In Their Sorrow/ The Red Face Of God/ Emblems/ As The World Disappears	4xLP by Current 93. Catalog number VOD75.
2010	When The Night Is Cruel (1979–1988)	4xLP by Mark Lane. Limited edition of 600 copies. Catalog number VOD76.
2010	Tracks To Glow In The Dark	2xLP, Ltd, Gat + 7" by Experimental Products. Limited edition of 600 copies. Catalog number VOD77.
2010	Untitled	LP by Absolute Body Control. 444 copies, numbered . Catalog number VOD37.1.
2010	Dokument III0 1979	3x7" by S.P.K. Packaged in a wooden box limited to 166 copies. Each 7" comes with the original 1979 cover artwork. Catalog number VOD 50.7, VOD 50.8, VOD 50.9.
2010	Christ And The Pale Queens, Mighty In Their Sorrow / The Red Face Of God	2xLP by Current 93. Limited edition of 231 copies. Catalog number VOD75.1 / 2.
2010	SixSixSix	4xLP, 7" and booklet by Sleep Chamber. Catalog number VOD79.
2010	Anthology One 1989–91	2xLP, by Voice Of Eye. Catalog number VOD80.
2010	Ghosts From A Machine; 1989–94	3xLP, by Rapoon. Catalog number VOD81.
2010	German Punk & Wave 78-84 Vol.1	5xLP, 10" by Various Artist. Catalog number VOD82.
2010	With White Stains at Stockholm plus Jarman Themes / Live New York 17-11-83 Plus Unclean Versions And More Unreleased & Rarities	4xLP, by Psychic TV. Catalog number VOD83.
2011	"Gesamtkunstwerk – Dokument 81-86"	5 × Vinyl, LP, by Laibach (band) Limited Edition DVD, DVD-Video, Box Set. Catalog number VOD84.
