= Close to the Noise Floor: Formative UK Electronica 1975–1984 =

Compilation album by Various artists
- Released: 26 April 2016
- Genre: Electronic
- Length: 4:15:03
- Label: Cherry Red

Professional ratings
Aggregate scores
Source	Rating
Metacritic	90/100
Review scores
Source	Rating
AllMusic	4.5/5 stars
Classic Rock	4/5 stars
Mojo	4/5 stars
Pitchfork	8.1/10
PopMatters	9/10
Record Collector	4/5 stars

Close to the Noise Floor: Formative UK Electronica 1975–1984 is a compilation album featuring electronica bands from 1975 to 1984. It was released on Cherry Red Records in April 2016.

== Track listing ==
Disc One
No.	Title	Artist	Length
1.	"Computer Bank"	Five Times of Dust	5:15
2.	"R.A.M."	The Klingons	5:32
3.	"Re-Education Through Labour"	Chris & Cosey	7:10
4.	"Sedation Strokes"	Malcolm Brown	4:07
5.	"Little Bob Minor"	Storm Bugs	3:33
6.	"Tight as a Drum"	Thomas Leer	4:39
7.	"Holiday Camp"	Blancmange	3:09
8.	"Fractured Smile"	Inner City Static	4:26
9.	"Sexuality"	We Be Echo	2:55
10.	"God with Us"	Bourbonese Qualk	5:53
11.	"Faith"	Nagamatzu	6:55
12.	"Disco Song"	O Yuki Conjugate	4:14
13.	"The Optimum Chant"	British Electric Foundation	4:11
14.	"All Night Long"	Kevin Harrison	1:34
15.	"Stopping and Starting"	Voice of Authority	5:58

Disc Two
No.	Title	Artist	Length
1.	"I Am Your Shadow"	Colin Potter	2:45
2.	"D’Ya Think I’m Sexy?"	British Standard Unit	2:25
3.	"The Single Off the Album"	Five Times of Dust	3:27
4.	"Back to the Beginning"	Spoon Fazer	2:38
5.	"Gerry and the Holograms"	Gerry And The Holograms	4:07
6.	"Drugface"	The Passage	3:48
7.	"A New Kind of Man"	John Foxx	4:32
8.	"Green for Go"	100% Manmade Fibre	3:02
9.	"Sentimental"	Those Little Aliens	1:59
10.	"Protect and Survive"	Final Program	2:26
11.	"Being Boiled"	The Human League	3:39
12.	"New Muzak"	Instant Automatons	1:50
13.	"Materialistic Man"	Cultural Amnesia	3:38
14.	"(Leaving Me) Now"	Worldbackwards	2:53
15.	"Music to Save the World By"	Alan Burnham	3:49
16.	"Almost"	Orchestral Manoeuvres in the Dark	3:42
17.	"Kodak Ghosts Run Amok"	Eyeless in Gaza	2:27
18.	"Broken Vein"	Schleimer K	4:22
19.	"The Distance from Köln"	Native Europe	2:28

Disc Three
No.	Title	Artist	Length
1.	"Adrenalin (Return of the Elohim, Pt. 1)"	Zorch	5:12
2.	"Robot Dance"	Sea of Wires	2:33
3.	"Sea of Tranquility"	Ron Berry	5:57
4.	"Mistral"	MFH	2:26
5.	"Joe Goes to New York"	Adrian Smith	6:52
6.	"Embryo (Extract)"	Mark Shreeve	6:13
7.	"Triptych"	E.g Oblique Graph)	6:36
8.	"Encounter"	Carl Matthews	6:43
9.	"Ynys Scaith"	Paul Nagle	4:18
10.	"Sedation"	O Yuki Conjugate	3:36
11.	"Western Vein"	Konstruktivits	3:46
12.	"Dead of Night (Excerpt)"	Attrition	6:01

Disc Four
No.	Title	Artist	Length
1.	"What a Day"	Throbbing Gristle	4:38
2.	"No Way of Knowing"	A Tent	3:29
3.	"Go for the Throat"	Portion Control	2:11
4.	"Eco Beat"	DC3	6:48
5.	"Dying Inside"	Renaldo and the Loaf	5:13
6.	"In the Army"	Blah Blah Blah	4:42
7.	"God Speed"	The Legendary Pink Dots	4:02
8.	"Muslin Gauze Muslim Prayer"	Muslimgauze	6:16
9.	"Live at Longborne"	Les Suisse	5:39
10.	"Menial Disorders, Extract B2"	Alien Brains	3:35
11.	"Himeal (And She Blew)"	Storm Bugs	4:52
12.	"In the Room"	Third Door From the Left	2:59
13.	"Dignity of Labour"	Al Robertson	5:25
14.	"Mzui (Extract)"	B.C. Gilbert / Graham Lewis / Russell Mills	5:33
