= Attrition (band) =

British dark wave band

- Origin: Coventry, England
- Genres: Dark wave; EBM; neoclassical dark wave; industrial; dark ambient
- Years active: 1980–present
- Labels: Third Mind; Projekt; Two Gods; Hyperium; Antler; Contempo
- Members: Martin Bowes; Simon Stansfield; Ashley Niblock; Richard Woodfield; Ian Arkley; Alia Miroschichenko
- Past members: Julia Niblock; Chris Bowes; Alan Rider; Marianne; Alex Novak; Pete Morris; Garry Cox; Laurie Reade; Sin D'rella; TyLean; Alexys Becerra; Kerri Bowes
- Website: www.attrition.co.uk

Attrition are an English dark wave band, formed in Coventry in 1980 by Martin Bowes and Julia Niblock. The band emerged from the experimental post-punk scene of the early 1980s and, along with other groups such as Throbbing Gristle, Coil, Einstürzende Neubauten, and In the Nursery, greatly contributed to the development of industrial music in the UK.

== History ==
=== Beginnings ===
In 1979, Martin started a xeroxed fanzine called Alternative Sounds to document the Coventry music scene (including such notables as The Specials and Furious Apples). The fanzine ran for 18 issues until 1981, and culminated in a vinyl compilation, "Sent from Coventry" (on Cherry Red) and a brief appearance on the BBC's Something Else programme. During this time, Martin met Julia at a local gig and, with the addition of Martin's brother Chris on guitar, Attrition was formed. In 1980 Chris was replaced by Julia's brother Ashley Niblock on synthesizer, and a short time later they replaced their live drummer with a drum machine; these changes facilitated Attrition's development beyond the post-punk of the early 80s into more experimental veins of sound.

=== 1980s ===
Influenced by punk's do-it-yourself aesthetic, Attrition took part in the emerging cassette culture, contributing multiple early tracks to underground cassette compilations and fanzines alongside contemporaries such as Portion Control, Konstruktivits, Chris & Cosey, The Legendary Pink Dots, Nurse with Wound, and Coil. Attrition's first album release came in the form of Death House, a cassette of two experimental electronic soundtracks inspired by zombie films. In 1983, Attrition received their first exposure in the national music press through a review by Dave Henderson in his "Wild Planet" column in Sounds, which led to their "Dreamsleep" track appearing on Henderson's compilation The Elephant Table Album, the band's first vinyl appearance. A postal collaboration via exchanges of 4-track recordings with Seattle-based improvisational collective Audio Leter led to Attrition's second cassette album release, Action and Reaction. Attrition's first London concert followed, with a supporting slot from Coil, and the first European tour in April 1984 with the Legendary Pink Dots.

The debut album The Attrition of Reason appeared on Third Mind Records in autumn of 1984. The next year, Julia left the band to join the Legendary Pink Dots, and Bowes returned with new band members Marianne, Alex Novak, and Pete Morris to release the second proper Attrition album, Smiling, at the Hypogonder Club, which was generally well received. The following year, however, this lineup dissolved and Bowes released In The Realm of the Hungry Ghosts, a collection of rarities, compilation tracks, and B-sides from the preceding few years. This was the last release on Third Mind. The band then switched to Belgium's Antler-Subway Records for the release of At the Fiftieth Gate in 1988, which saw the addition of guitarist Gary Cox.

=== 1990s ===
After a short hiatus, Bowes began work on music once more and Julia rejoined Attrition in 1990. A compilation of songs from previous releases was released by Projekt Records in the US, introducing Attrition to US audiences. "A Tricky Business" was released in 1991 on Italy's Contempo Records and marked a new era for the band. These US releases were complemented with European editions on German labels Hyperium and Trisol. The Hidden Agenda came out in 1993, followed by Ephemera in 1995, which mirrored the dark ambient nature of early album Death House.

1996 saw the release of 3 Arms And A Dead Cert, which showed an increased use of organic instruments, including the first use of live orchestral elements as provided by Franck Dematteis of the Paris Opera. This album also was the first proper release on Projekt, a relationship that would continue for many years and would see the release of a succession of albums during the '90s that saw progressed development of Attrition's signature sound. Also in 1996 the band toured the US for the first time, at the culmination of which Julia left the band once more. The following year, Bowes revisited various works from the past decade of Attrition music and recorded new classical string variations of the songs, releasing them as Etude. After heavy touring in the late 1990s, including a stop at Wave-Gotik-Treffen, Attrition released The Jeopardy Maze in 1999.

=== 2000s ===
Five years passed between The Jeopardy Maze and the next Attrition album, Dante's Kitchen, released in 2004. During the interim a remix album and a rarities album were put out and the entire back catalog of Attrition was reissued on CD in Europe and the band focused on touring and playing live again. Attrition finally founded their own label, Two Gods, in 2006 and released Tearing Arms from Deities, a 25th anniversary collection of material spanning Attrition's career, and Something Stirs - The Beginning, a collection of many of their cassette compilation tracks from the early 1980s. Two Gods would serve as a vehicle for releasing remastered reissues of the entire Attrition back catalogue in the following years. It has also served as a label for releases from other bands, including Rossetti's Compass.

In June 2008, Attrition once more became a multi-member act with the addition of female vocalist Sin D'rella. Bowes and Sin then released the twelfth album proper for the band, All Mine Enemys Whispers - The Story of Mary Ann Cotton, a concept album built around the true story of a mid-19th century serial killer in England, the arresting officer of whom Bowes is a descendant. The album bears a marked departure from what has come to be seen as the signature Attrition sound, ditching prominent synthesizer base lines, percussion, and vocals for atmospheric, ambient, and found sounds. Guests on the album include Emilie Autumn, Erica Mulkey, and Bowes' own two children.

2009 has seen the release of a live album, Kill the Buddha!, that celebrates 25 years of live touring, and Wrapped in the guise of my friend, an album of Attrition songs covered by other bands. In 2012, Martin worked with his wife Kerri on their first full-length movie score, Invocation. Martin taught music technology at City College in Coventry for many years and left in 2011 to work full-time on mastering and production for Attrition and other artists in his studio The Cage. In 2013, the band released, The Unraveller of Angels, which was followed in 2015 with Millions of the Mouthless Dead. The latter album Martin made with Anni Hogan (of Marc and the Mambas fame), which explored First World War poetry set to dark ambient scores, including a guest appearance from Wolfgang Flur (ex-Kraftwerk). 2024 saw the release of the first new album in 8 years - The Black Maria.

== Musical influences and characteristics ==
Martin Bowes has cited a wide variety of influences on his music, including experimental rock, punk, post-punk, and industrial groups such as The Velvet Underground, Crass, the Sex Pistols, Magazine, Joy Division, and Cabaret Voltaire, early experimental electronic groups like Kraftwerk, classic rock'n'roll (Elvis), and even Beethoven.

In the early 1980s, Attrition was grouped into the post-punk movement, and as post-punk birthed subgenres and cross-pollinated with others, the band came to be seen as an early and influential part of the fledgling industrial and darkwave genres. Later on they would also gain a considerable following among the goth scene. By the early 1990s Bowes had become the primary member and songwriter and Attrition had developed its own distinctive electro-acoustic sound. This was based on Martin's deep growl, Julia's fretless bass work and breathy sub-operatic vocals, and a backline of electronic instrumentation, comprising analogue synthesizers (including a Korg Mono/Poly and Korg MS-20), sequencer (Roland MC-202), drum machine (Roland TR-808), and various effects units.

"At first, there wasn't the same sort of scene and we were in more of an 'industrial' thing. There was nothing like the clubs you get now, it was actually quite difficult to play anywhere that would appreciate you. It's a lot easier now, it's not just Goth, it's a mix - Darkwave or whatever. That's gotten stronger, so that has helped, but really, we were there before it was built."

== Discography ==
(selected; a full discography can be obtained from the official website — see links below)

=== Albums ===
- (1982) Death House
- (1983) Action and Reaction (a collaboration with Audio Leter)
- (1984) The Attrition of Reason
- (1985) Smiling, at The Hypogonder Club
- (1988) At the Fiftieth Gate
- (1991) A Tricky Business
- (1993) The Hidden Agenda
- (1995) Ephemera
- (1996) 3 Arms and a Dead Cert
- (1997) Etude (early works performed by a chamber orchestra)
- (1999) The Jeopardy Maze
- (2003) The Eternity LP (more classical works)
- (2004) Dante's Kitchen
- (2008) All Mine Enemys Whispers - The story of Mary Ann Cotton
- (2012) Invocation - a film score
- (2013) The Unraveller of Angels
- (2015) Millions of The Mouthless Dead
- (2024) The Black Maria
- (2025) Second Onslaught 2025 (80's rarities)

=== Compilation albums ===
- (1986) In the Realm of the Hungry Ghosts (a compilation of remixed early material)
- (1990) Recollection: 84-89
- (2000) The Hand that Feeds - the remixes
- (2000) Esoteria (1982–1999, a collection of ambient works)
- (2001) Keepsakes And Reflections (B-sides and rarities)
- (2006) Something Stirs - the beginning (1981–83)
- (2006) Tearing Arms from Deities (25 year anniversary collection of rare, remastered and remixed material)
- (2010) Wrapped in the guise of my friend - the tribute album
- (2010) Dreamtime Collectors: 1980–2010 (The Best of Collection)
- (2011) Demonstro =: 1981–86
- (2014) In Dark Dreams: 1980-2015
- (2022) A Great Desire (1986 - 2004)

=== Live albums ===
- (1985) Terminal Kaleidoscope (split with Legendary Pink Dots)
- (2000) Heretic Angels - Live in the USA. 1999
- (2008) Across the divide - Live in Holland. 1984
- (2009) Kill the Buddha! - Live on the 25 year anniversary tour
- (2011) The Truth In Dark Corners - Live in the Netherlands. 1985
- (2014) Live at The General Wolfe. 21.04.83
- (2016) Live at Club Neutral - Toronto 06/06/2010
- (2018) Live in Wellington. New Zealand. 11.05.18
- (2019) Invocation. Live in Toronto. 2019
- (2022) Live at Projektfest, Chicago, USA - 1996
- (2023) Live in The Cage. 07.02.23
