= The Elephant Table Album =

Compilation album by Various artists
- Released: 1983
- Label: Xtract

The Elephant Table Album: a compilation of difficult music was a 1983 compilation album, released on Xtract Records. The double album was compiled by music journalist Dave Henderson following a series of articles by him in Sounds, the British music paper. It was reissued on CD by the same label in 1989, but with the tracks sourced from the vinyl release rather than the master tape, and the number of tracks reduced from 21 to 17. The tracks consisted of a selection by lesser-known experimental, industrial and electronic artists of the period.

== Track listing ==
Side 1

- Portion Control - Chew You To Bits
- Chris and Cosey - Raining Tears Of Blood
- Metamorphosis - Musak From Hawthorne Court
- Coil - S Is For Sleep
- Nurse With Wound - Nana Or A Thing Of Uncertain Nonsense

Side 2

- 400 Blows - Beat The Devil
- Konstruktivits - Andropov '84
- Lustmord - The Boning Of Men
- Muslimgauze - Milena Jelenska
- David Jackman - Edge of Nothing

Side 3

- SPK - Despair
- MFH - Vox Humana
- Nocturnal Emissions - Suffering Stinks
- Attrition - Dream Sleep
- Legendary Pink Dots - Surprise, Surprise
- Paul Kelday - Birth of Planetesimals

Side 4

- Bourbonese Qualk - Under The City
- Sirius B - Build Your Children
- New 7th Music - New Human Switchbaord (Extract)
- We Be Echo - Alleycat
- Bushido - Modelwerk

== Release details ==
- Catalogue number: Xx001
- Format: Double Vinyl LP (5 September 1983), single CD (1989)
- The CD version lacks the tracks by Paul Kelday, We Be Echo, New 7th Music and Muslimgauze.

== Influence ==
Steven Stapleton of Nurse with Wound also did the artwork for the album, and was sufficiently impressed by David Jackman's track that he invited him to collaborate on a series of music projects.

The album has been cited as an influence on the EBM genre.

Despite the "difficult" nature of the music, one band on the album, 400 Blows, hit the British charts in 1985 with "Movin'", a cover version of a Brass Construction song.

== Three Minute Symphony ==
A second album, Three Minute Symphony (XTract XX002), was released in 1984; again it was a double LP compiled by Dave Henderson. Each artist was invited to provide a track of approximately three minutes' duration. In contrast to The Elephant Table Album's emphasis on British-based music, many of the featured artists were from other countries, including the USA, France, Belgium, Germany, Italy and Japan.

- Side 1
1. Kill Ugly Pop Let's Get Real Gone
2. Ptôse - Waiting For My Soul
3. Trax - Trax Co Mix 1
4. Die Tödliche Doris - Maria
5. Van Kaye And Ignit - A Slice Of The Action
6. Bene Gesserit - White Men
- Side 2
1. Colin Potter - The State
2. Human Flesh - L'Ultima Storia
3. DDAA - Your Mother With A Cake
4. Point of Collapse - When Worlds Collide
5. David Jackman - Wolf
6. Sema - Untitled
- Side 3
1. Hunting Lodge - Tribal Warning Shot (instrumental)
2. Roll Kommando - Die Romantik Ist Tot
3. Stratis - I Fotia
4. Merzbow - Xa-Bungle
5. Philip Johnson - Always Behind You
6. Conrad Schnitzler - Three Minute Symphony No 1
- Side 4
1. Magamatzu - Bird, Spider, Fly
2. Hurt - Money Matters
3. Nurse With Wound - Antacid Cocamotive 93
4. Legendary Pink Dots - No Bell, No Prize
5. Asmus Tietchens - Dahinter Industriegelande
6. Smegma - The Breathing Method
