= Factsheet Five =

American magazine

- Factsheet Five #25, February 1988, featuring cover art by Freddie Baer
- Editor: Mike Gunderloy ("Æditor", 1982–1991); Hudson Luce (1991); R. Seth Friedman (1992–1998)
- Categories: Zine reviews & culture
- Frequency: quarterly (varied)
- Circulation: 10,500/issue (1991)
- Publisher: Mike Gunderloy (1982–1991); Hudson Luce (1991); R. Seth Friedman (1992–1998)
- First issue: 1982
- Company: Pretzel Press (?-1991)
- Country: United States of America
- Language: English
- ISSN: 0890-6823

Factsheet Five was a periodical mostly consisting of short reviews of "zines", privately produced printed matter along with contact details of the editors and publishers.

In the 1980s and early 1990s, its comprehensive reviews made it the most important publication in its field, increasing distribution channels for self-publishers and heralding the wider spread of what would eventually be called fanzine or zine culture. A number of underground artists and writers read or submitted their work to Factsheet Five, including John Porcellino, Julie Doucet, and Jonathan Lethem.

Before the widespread adoption of the web and e-mail beginning around 1994, publications such as Factsheet Five formed a vital directory for connecting like-minded people. It was the literary equivalent to such phenomena as International Sound Communication in the period of cassette culture.

== History ==
The magazine was originally published in 1982 by Mike Gunderloy on a spirit duplicator with a run of 50 copies soon after he moved to the Hyde Park neighborhood in Boston. He started publishing this zine due to frustrations over writing about the same oddities or discoveries to different friends back in California as well as the infrequent publication of The Stark Fist of Removal, of which he was a fan. The original focus was science fiction fanzines (the title comes from a short story by science fiction author John Brunner), but it included other reviews. Bob Grumman contributed a regular column on avant-garde poetry from 1987 to 1992.

Gunderloy later moved to Rensselaer, New York, where he continued to publish. By 1987, he was running a zine BBS, one of the first associated with an underground publication. In 1990, Cari Goldberg Janice and (briefly) Jacob Rabinowitz joined as co-editors. Gunderloy quit publishing Factsheet Five following the completion of Issue #44 in 1991.

Hudson Luce purchased the rights to Factsheet Five and published a single issue, Issue #45, with the help of BBS enthusiast Bill Paulouskas, cartoonist Ben Gordon, writer Jim Knipfel, and artist Mark Bloch, who had begun authoring a mail art-related column called "Net Works" during the Gunderloy years.

R. Seth Friedman then published the magazine for five years in San Francisco, with the help of Christopher Becker, Miriam Wolf and Jerod Pore, until Issue #64 in 1998. Circulation grew to 16,000 during that time as the zine scene moved from the underground to mainstream culture.

Gunderloy later worked as a computer programmer before retiring in 2020. He co-authored the book SQL Server 7 in Record Time.

== In other media ==
Jerod Pore collected articles and reviews from the print version of Factsheet Five, and with them produced Factsheet Five - Electric, one of the first zines to use the Usenet newsgroup alt.zines. Beginning in the late 1980s, Gunderloy and Pore also established a substantial online presence on the WELL, an influential, private dial-up BBS.

Three books were published based on Factsheet Five: How to Publish a Fanzine by Gunderloy (1988; Loompanics), The World of Zines, by Gunderloy and Janice (1992; Penguin), and The Factsheet Five Zine Reader by Friedman (1997, Three Rivers Press). Until 1989, Gunderloy collected and, in turn, made available several versions of the Gemstone File. A number of Gunderloy's zine reviews from Factsheet Five also appeared in edited form in High Weirdness by Mail.

Mike Gunderloy's Factsheet Five Collection of over 10,000 zines and mail art is now held at the New York State Library in Albany, New York, where it occupies 300 cubic feet (8.5 m^{3}). However, only about 4000 zines in the collection have been cataloged.

About 1/4 of the zines in the collection are listed on Excelsior, the New York State Library's electronic catalog; staff of the Manuscripts & Special Collection can help locate other items.

R. Seth Friedman donated 240 zines to the Little Maga/Zine Collection of the San Francisco Public Library.
