= Electronic Cottage =

Cover page of Electronic Cottage #6, 1991 featuring Minóy

Electronic Cottage was a printed magazine that championed and examined DIY cassette culture phenomenon, including reviewers of sound collage, noise music, electronic music and other forms of experimental music. There were six issue produced between the years 1989 to 1991. The first issue was published in April 1989. Hal McGee was the magazine's editor and publisher. The magazine was based in Apollo Beach, Florida. It has since been revived as an online community, emphasizing experimental music and its creators.

== Policy on community ==
Electronic Cottage was the only magazine devoted entirely to the home-taper scene. It emphasized its community communication aspect, with mailing addresses included in the magazine, as well as ample information to introduce its readers to new sound artists with the goal of facilitating further creative interaction between home tapers.

== Cassette compilations ==
Three cassette compilations were produced by Hal McGee in association with his Electronic Cottage magazine. They included quirky spoken-word pieces, dark noise music, incidental music, ambient music, sound collage, psychedelia, synthesizer music, folksy, pop, and weird rock music. The online version continues to produce compilations occasionally.

== Contributing writers ==
- Hal McGee
- Andrew Orford
- Al Margolis (If, Bwana)
- Chris Phinney
- Dave Prescott
- Bill Waid
- Dreamgirl Stephanie Ashlyn
- Carl Howard
- John Hudak
- Allan Conroy
- John Collegio
- Jeph Jerman
- Roger Moneymaker
- Robin James
- Bret Hart
