= PBK (composer) =

- Born: Phillip B. Klingler; 1960 (age 65–66)
- Origin: Flint, Michigan, U.S.
- Genres: Noise, electroacoustic music, sound art, musique concrète
- Occupation: Composer
- Years active: 1986–present
- Website: PBK Sound Bandcamp

Phillip B. Klingler (born 1960), known as PBK, is a composer that works in the genres of Noise, Drone and/or Ambient music.

== Background ==
American composer PBK has been active in the experimental music underground since 1986. His work first became known through the homemade independent cassette culture scene of the 1980s, though later releases have also been in compact disc and LP format. His work has correlations to electroacoustic, classic industrial and free jazz genres. His compositions are created using extreme turntable manipulation, sampling, analog and digital synthesis. Improvising spontaneously and with little preconception, PBK creates pulsing, dense soundscapes of unknown sonic origin.

In the years 1992–1996, PBK lived in Puerto Rico where he began experimenting with record turntables and extreme use of MIDI sequencer programming creating an early form of glitch best exemplified by the cassette album, Listening To The World Vibrate. Several other projects were completed including a 3-LP boxset titled Domineer/Asesino/Retro and a CD release titled Life-Sense Revoked, a collaboration with other artists.

PBK has performed live throughout the U.S. and in Europe. A collaborator, he has worked with several names in experimental music. A partial list would include such musicians as Asmus Tietchens, Aube, Jarboe (of Swans), Jim O'Rourke, Minóy, Vidna Obmana and Wolf Eyes. Over the course of nearly thirty years, PBK has had over 75 full-length albums released internationally, establishing a body of work in the Noise music aesthetic.

== Partial list of recordings ==
- ¡Asesino! (1988) (Cassette, PBK Recordings)
- Vivisection (1988) (Cassette, PBK Recordings)
- I - Descent (1988) (Cassette, PBK Recordings)
- II - Tonguespeak (1988) (Cassette, PBK Recordings)
- III - Poetry & Motion (1988) (Cassette, Sound of Pig)
- IV - Warfare State (1988) (Cassette, PBK Recordings)
- Die Brücke (1988) (Cassette, PBK Recordings)
- Appeal (1989) (Cassette, PBK Recordings)
- A Noise Supreme (1989) (Cassette, PBK Recordings)
- Compositions : Depression & Ideal (with Vidna Obmana) (1989) (Cassette, PBK Recordings/Freedom in a Vacuum)
- Monument of Empty Colours (with Vidna Obmana) (1989) (Cassette, Decade Collection)
- The Music of Her Sleep / Towards the Enfolding Flower (with Vidna Obmana) (1990) (Cassette, Decade Collection)
- Narcosis (1990) (Cassette, PBK Recordings)
- Thrill Pictures Vol 1 (1990) (Cassette, PBK Recordings)
- Thrill Pictures Vol 2 (1990) (Cassette, PBK Recordings)
- Fragment 3 (with Vidna Obmana) (1991) (Cassette, N D)
- Profusion (1991) (Cassette, Realization Recordings)
- Five Manifestoes (with Asmus Tietchens) (1992) (CD, Realization Recordings)
- Domineer / Asesino! / Retro (1992) (3xLP Box, RRRecords)
- Macrophage / The Toil and the Reap (1992) (CD, N D)
- Shadows of Prophecy / In His Throes (1994) (CD, N D)
- Listening to the World Vibrate (1995) (Cassette, PBK Recordings)
- Life-Sense Revoked (1996) (CD, Lunhare)
- Headmix (1997) (Cassette, PBK Recordings)
- The Mescaline Tracks (1997) (Cassette, PBK Recordings)
- Dreams in Moving Space (with Artemiy Artemiev) (2000) (CD, Electroshock Records)
- A Moment of Infinity (with Artemiy Artemiev) (2002) (CD, Electroshock Records)
- Auditory Hallucination of Drowsy Afternoon (with Government Alpha) (2007) (CD, Xerxes)
- Cloisters (with Minóy) (recorded in 1987, released in 2008) (Cassette, The Sound Genetic)
- Chansons Mystiques (with Minóy) (recorded in 1988, released in 2009) (Cassette, The Sound Genetic)
- The Deadened Stream of Eve (2009) (Cassette, Community College)
- Under My Breath (feat. contributions from John Wiggins, Akifumi Nakajima (Aube), Wolf Eyes, Nocturnal Emissions, and more) (2009) (CD, Waystyx)
- Invasive Species (with Anla Courtis) (2013) (Cassette, Green Records and Tapes)
- Unidentified Again (with Jim O'Rourke) (2015) (2xLP, Pica Disk)
- Rabid (with Wolf Eyes) (2016) (LP, Sonoris)
- Solution Circulaire (2019) (Cassette, PBK Self-Released)
- Tongue of a Stabbed Host (2019) (Cassette, PBK Self-Released)
- Thinking of Eternity (recorded 1998, released 2019) (LP, Table Sports)
- Disquietude In Shouting Tomorrows (with Richard Ramirez & A Week Of Kindness) (2021) (Cassette, Orb Tapes)
- Erosion of the Monolith (with Nocturnal Emissions) (2022) (LP, Nihilist)
- Elemental Studies (with Various Artists) (2025) (CD, Carpe Sonum Novum

== Critical description and reception ==
- Life-Sense Revoked (1996)

"Exceedingly well done, highly skilled, beautiful and exciting electronic sound collage work. Here, PBK, who's already become widely known for his prolific and quality projects, works with other well-known electronic artists such as AMK (and thus there's lots of turntable experimentation), Hands To, Deaf Lions and two pieces with Jarboe. Anyone with a serious interest in the abstract ways of sound need to seek out PBK." (AUTOreverse Magazine)

- Narcosis (1990)

"This latest release by PBK continues his exploration of, ummm, noise. Flowing, churning, developing abstract noise textures. I've no idea how they were created or manipulated: they possess an authentic identity of their own somewhere between electronic, mechanical and environmental noise. PBK's aim is to use this unpromising material to reeducate our ears, show us that noise really is nice. His music has ranged in the past from the musical to the unlistenable, but this cassette is neither: it really does stand on its own merits, as a new listening experience. Post-apocalypse ambient atmospheres." (E.S.T. Magazine)

- Shadows of Prophecy/In His Throes (1994)

"Difficult music for difficult times, there seems to be an impenetrability to PBK's music that acts as an obstacle for a full appreciation of his work. He's one of the few American sound sculptors who bypass notions of ambient or even the avant-garde, simply because he sounds like no one else, and because his music charters through those murky waters, assimilating and changing them as well. It's a mystery how these seemingly random pieces fit into any comprehensible scheme. Rhythm, melody, harmony, even dissonance achieve new meanings here; though those musical absolutes are absent, PBK somehow creates new definitions for them himself. Unearthly, unknown and unlike any 'music' created today." (i/E Magazine)

- Under My Breath (2009)

"PBK... is attached to the old and the new, the younger generation of sound artists. Pieces on Under My Breath were recorded with people like Akifumi Nakajima (Aube), Christian Renou (Brume), Dale Lloyd, John Wiggins, Nigel Ayers, Slavek Kwi (Artificial Memory Trace), Tore Boe and Wolf Eyes. PBK uses natural or man-made acoustic sounds, digital glitching and turntable noise, but his goal is to create music that is organic and not (too) noise based. He blends his various source recordings together and makes up a sound that falls half way in the old ambient industrial school and the other half shows an interest in using computer processing for his sounds." (Vital Weekly)

- Tongue of a Stabbed Host (2019)

"It takes the old PBK sounds that we first heard in the late '80s, into the 21st century. It is what we could easily be called industrial music, for the lack of a better word. The tools of the trade might have been changed (which, for all I know might not be the case), from analog to digital, or more likely a combination of both. But it remains seven wild noise-inspired pieces of music. Synthesizers sounding like a bunch of insects, brutal drones straight from the conveyor belt, and feedback in rotation. There might also be manipulation of real instruments in Misspent Genetic, which results in some brutal modern version of musique concrète. Pinnacle Of The Sand Priest is the moment of quietness here, but even in the quietest of moments, PBK has a great creepy approach to sound. Still strong, literally, after all these years, still powerful electronics." (Vital Weekly)

== PBK posthumous Minóy project ==
In 2013, PBK worked out an agreement with Minóy's partner, Stuart Hass, to obtain Minóy's archive of recorded work. In it he discovered that among Minoy's master tapes were recordings made in the years after Minoy had stopped distributing his cassettes. Many of the unreleased works were released by various labels starting in 2013. In 2014 Punctum Books, in collaboration with PBK and Joseph Nechvatal, released posthumous recorded material on CD and cassette, entitled simply Minóy. These nine audio recordings, selected by PBK and Nechvatal, were accompanied by a Punctum book.
