= Minóy =

American noise musician

- Minóy (Stanley Keith Bowsza)
- Born: Stanley Keith Bowsza; October 30, 1951
- Died: March 19, 2010 (aged 58)
- Known for: Sound art, Noise Music, DIY
- Movement: Noise Music, Cassette culture, Power electronics, Art punk, Electroacoustic music Musique concrète

Stanley Keith Bowsza (October 30, 1951 — March 19, 2010), better known by the pseudonym Minóy, was an American electronic musician and sound artist. He was a major figure in the DIY noise music and homemade independent cassette culture scene of the 1980s. He released over 100 compositions.

== Life and work ==
Stanley Keith Bowsza chose his pseudonym Minóy based upon how someone he met mispronounced the name of one of his favorite artists, the Catalan Surrealist Joan Miró. He is recognized as a master of controlled noise. He lived and worked in Torrance, California.

Minóy produced some of the most remarkably engrossing, beautiful and imaginative work-of-art albums released on cassette in the 1980s, often with hand made covers. Minóy was an agoraphobic but prolific noise artist intensely active in the music underground between the years 1986 and 1992. During that period he created many unique audio works in collaboration with other sound artists and mail artists. Minóy was an avid mail collaborator, collaborating with noted experimental American composers such as PBK (Phillip B. Klingler) (also as Disco Splendor), If, Bwana (as Bwannoy), Damian Bisciglia a/k/a Agog (as No Mail On Sundays), Zan Hoffman (as Minóy\Zannóy), Dave Prescott (as PM), Not 1/2 (as El Angel Exterminador), Tom Furgas, and many others.

But he is best known for his solo palimpsest-like multi-tracked soundscape compositions, production that follows the incorporation of electric sound into compositional practice similar at times to that of the Groupe de Recherches Musicales and John Cage's Williams Mix. A good example is his widely circulated dark ambient composition Tango that was released in 1988 on Tellus Audio Cassette Magazine’s Issue 20 entitled Media Myth.

His music is a form of labyrinthian droning collage electronics that produced an otherworldly effect. It is a form of highly textured, manipulated and layer noise that often creates a sonic painting-like effect. Many of his tape releases had only one or two compositions on them, thus allowing him the time to develop a theme and hypnotically immerse the listener in what were usually very powerful works of art.

His challenging, irritating at times, ambient musique concrète recordings were often created by echoing and multi-tracking sounds (like field recordings and short wave transmissions) into deep noisy ambient music. Sometimes he used a constant murmuring voice along with the found sounds or shrieks or staccato guitar bursts or the twitter of a toy mouth organ. His tapes were more often than not delicate yet powerfully embellished soundscapes.

Minóy's audio agglomeration and sound manipulation was celebrated in 1991 when his image appeared on the cover of the July 1991 issue of Electronic Cottage magazine. He was profiled in the issue as well.

He stopped releasing his recordings in 1992.

== Posthumous publications ==
In 2013, fellow composer and former collaborator PBK (Phillip B. Klingler) worked out an agreement with Minoy's partner, Stuart Hass, to obtain Minoy's archive of recorded work. In it he discovered that among Minoy's master tapes were recordings made in the years after Minoy had stopped distributing his cassettes. Many of the unreleased works were released by various labels starting in 2013.

In 2014 Punctum Books released some of the best posthumous recorded material on CD and cassette, entitled simply Minóy. These nine audio recordings were accompanied by a Punctum book on Minóy that was edited by Joseph Nechvatal. The book, also entitled Minóy, contains written essays by Nechvatal and Maya Eidolon, and sixty black and white portrait images from the Minóy as Haint as King Lear series that photographer Maya Eidolon (aka Amber Sabri) created before Minóy's death in collaboration with Minóy (then known as Haint) and Stuart Hass.

== Post-Minóy activity ==
Prior to Minóy's death in 2010, the photographer Maya Eidolon, in collaboration with Minóy (then known by the pseudonyms Haint or My Life as a Haint) and Stuart Hass (Minóy's lifetime partner), created a series of photographs of Minóy posing as King Lear.

Minóy as My Life as a Haint also created a large series of digital art abstractions before his death and Maya Eidolon has created a montage animation of them called Infinity Arcade on Vimeo.

Since 2013, the official Minóy Archive has been completed and maintained by Phillip B. Klingler after Klingler received Minóy's entire cassette tape archive. The Minóy Archive has resulted in releasing 160 unknown never before heard Minóy sound art works.

== Partial list of recordings ==
- Doctor In a Dark Room
- Clouded Silver
- Firebird
- In Search Of Tarkovsky
- Landscape With Serpent
- Pretty Young Negro Man
- PBK & Minoy Cloisters
- Nightlsaves
- Passage Of The Migratory Bird
- Solo Guitar Tracks
- Devil Music
- Ejaculations Paris 1919
- The Art Of Egyptian Bathing
- Celebration Of The Sunrise
- Sum Sum Soo (Released 2019 via Tribe Tapes)

== Critical description and reception ==
- White With a Crust Of Chill
  - Thick layers of sounds added together make a detailed and overwhelming mix. Most of the tapes from Minóy have a distinct sound, sort of like high-pitched machine noises with bits of different musics wafting in and out of focus. Excellent, Must hear. (Robin James, Sound Choice #5, 1986)
- Obscure Medicines
  - Have you ever screwed up something so bad or got caught doing something so embarrassing that the memory of it, even years later, is physically painful? Well, Minóy has just composed a sound collage for you if you have. The opening track, "Naked Came The Memory", begins with mechanical chattering, industrial pounding, a stringed instrument suffering rape and torture, and a haunting drone that sounds like a far off air raid siren stuck on a middle tone. All this builds up, ebbs away and then comes back full in your face like the naked truths we must face from time to time. On the title track it sounds like every stringed instrument in Torrance, California tuning up in Minóy's living room until the sounds swirl and rotate about each other like some discordant tornado. Five more equally disturbing or masochistically pleasing tunes follow, perfect background music when your Uncle Bob overstays his welcome, drinks the last shot of Old Thompson and still won't go home." (Mick Mather, Sound Choice #9, 1987)
- Plain Wrap Purgatory
  - An acknowledged master of sound collage offers two sidelong pieces, the title cut and "Flying Overhead". For the uninitiated, this is the guy who lives under your bed and creates soundtracks for your worst nightmares. "Purgatory" greets the listener with disembodied voices, moans, groans, demonic howling, clanging, industrial drones, and a stringed instrument tinkling like windchimes from hell, er, purgatory. These sounds are layered, bent, treated and kicked in and out of the mix, a Minóy trademark. On side two it appears our sins have been purged, We're treated to an airy, uplifting blend of sound, giving the impression that you might be flying and making that last connection out of purgatory. Then, en route to some higher place the tone begins to turn brooding and ominous once more, like ice forming on the wings... Mary, Mother of GOD, full of grace..." (Mick Mather, Sound Choice #9, 1987)
- Pretty Young Negro Man
  - More kooky, psychotic, and truly hellish sounds from this prolific sound composer. Followed immediately by loud, high-pitched machine interruptions. Groans, drones and warps loop in and out of sequence. Found sounds from many sources are woven into the irregular rhythm of the piece. A severely distorted string instrument is being beaten to death and gives out horrific, inhuman cries. There's also some of the strangest vocal manipulations I've ever heard. On side two Minoy plays with the radio dial, turning it slowly to catch extended bits of random speech and Mexican music, and turning it quickly to get clicks and honks. It is as if several radios are shot through a tremendous p.a. system. A peaceful, yet oddly disturbing synth is laid on top. The overall mood is alarming, playful and determined. (Christopher Carstens, Sound Choice #9, 1987)
- Firebird and The Flavor Of Acid On Ice
  - Minóy is one of the stalwart figures of the cassette network. At last count there were 63 tapes available and an untold number of collaborations and compilation appearances. These are two relatively recent releases. On both Minóy builds surging/droning looping icicle shaped sound pictures out of minimal electronics. I prefer the earlier "Firebird" for its more varied moods. "Morning" is especially evocative. That's when I enjoy his music the most, in the morning, as sun cuts in low across the room. Sound mingles with dust particles floating in a beam. "The Flavor Of Acid On Ice" gets a bit more violent in its imagery. Both are capable of Producing these visual pictures through sound. (Glen Thrasher, Lowlife 13, 1988)
- Doctor In A Dark Room/Babel
  - Two 30-minute pieces of unique textural richness, borrowing something from industrial, Ligeti, Xenakis, and Tangerine Dream. 'Doctor' creates a mesmerizing effect by constantly hovering between tone and noise, disembodied orchestras and choirs singing multi-timbral drones, crashing waves of sound... best at high volume, but not late at night. 'Babel' is multi-tracked radios (FM, AM, Shortwave, CB, etc.) voices wreaking havoc with meaning and intelligibility in a dense riot of glossolalia. I'd call Minóy a 'maximalist' as he is unafraid of thick and heavy textures which could run the risk of collapsing upon themselves. (Tom Furgas, Option Magazine, Jan/Feb 1985)
- Future Perfect
  - This consistently engaging tape plays tricks on your perceptions by displaying large sheets of texture that overlap one another so that it becomes impossible to discern whether they are organic or synthetic. Under this he further confounds us with barely perceptible voices that haunt from afar. Filled with a strange beauty, it evokes images of imaginary landscapes. (Kim Cascone, Option Magazine, Jan/Feb 1985)
- Landscape With Serpent
  - More great sonic mayhem from the master of the musically macabre. On side A, the 'Stalker' is that presence following you down that ciurcuitous tunnel to hell. 'Programmatic' isn't a dirty word, but for the most part, this surpasses that and is just plain eerie. The title side evokes visions of a primordial wasteland with a menagerie of strange, lumbering life-forms cavorting way off in the (safe) distance. In the closing section, the serpent's lonely wails penetrate the heavy mist and fog. (Jack Jordan, Option Magazine, Sept/Oct 1987)

== See also ==
- Cassette Culture
- Experimental music
- Electroacoustic improvisation
- Noise Music
- Sonology
- Sound recording and reproduction
- Sound Art
