= Storm Bugs =

English post punk band

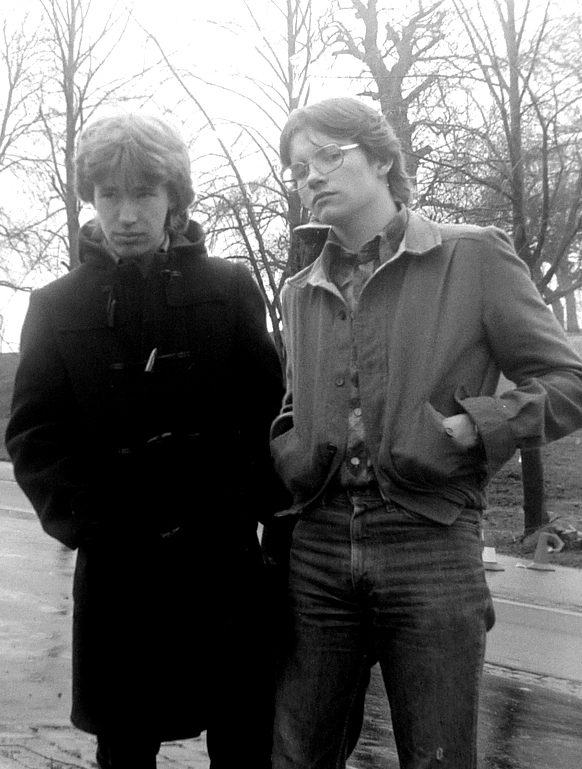
- Philip Sanderson (left) and Steven Ball (right) in 1979.

Background information
- Genres: Post-punk, electronic, industrial
- Years active: 1979–1982; 2001–present
- Members: Philip Sanderson; Steven Ball
- Website: http://www.stormbugs.co.uk/

Storm Bugs are an English post punk band formed in 1978 in Deptford, London, England, by Philip Sanderson and Steven Ball who had met in the Medway Towns, England. The band have been linked to a number of genres including: cassette culture, industrial music and DIY. Storm Bugs were initially active between 1978 and 1982 and reformed in 2001.

== 1978–82 ==
Sanderson had experimented with tape recorders whilst still at school, after moving to London in 1978 he began to get out of hours access to the electronic music studio at Goldsmiths College (equipped with the EMS VCS3 synthesizer) and also purchased a Revox reel to reel tape recorder setting up a DIY home studio. It was using these facilities that Sanderson recorded much of the Storm Bugs output from 1978 to 1980 with Ball designing the artwork for the releases.

The first Storm Bugs release was on Snatch 1 on the Snatch Tapes cassette label. Snatch Tapes was part of the then burgeoning cassette culture scene and also released tapes by David Jackman (later of Organum), and Claire Thomas & Susan Vezey as well as compilations with tracks by amongst others: the Lemon Kittens, Alien Brains, Cultural Amnesia Orior, Sea of Wires, and the Beach Surgeons (led by a young Graham Massey, later of 808 State).

Storm Bugs released three cassettes albums on Snatch Tapes: A Safe Substitute (1980), Storm Bugs (1980) and Gift (1981). In 1980 the band released their first vinyl record the Table Matters EP on Loop Records (UK). In 1981 Storm Bugs released their second single an industrial rockabilly 7-inch called "Metamorphose", on the French L'invitation au Suicide label. Ball provided lead vocals on both sides of the record. Further recordings were made in 1981/1982 but not released with the band effectively going into hibernation for 20 years. Sanderson and Ball however continued to collaborate on other projects including in 1988 the film Green on the Horizon.

== 2000 – 2013, Rediscovery ==
Storm Bugs were rediscovered in 2000 when they were included on the bootleg LP I Hate the Pop Group, on Vertical Slum Records. A year later Snatch Tapes reactivated and released a compilation of some of the bands finer moments from the past, entitled Let's Go Outside And Get It Over, this was the start of a re-issue programme that saw much of Storm Bugs original material being rereleased on vinyl.

The following year, 2002 rare and previously unreleased recordings were collected by the Fusetron label, and released on an LP called Up The Middle Down The Sides. In the same year the band also released a 4-track EP of new material called The Bugs Are Back on the Austrian label Klanggalerie.

In 2006 the German label Vinyl On Demand issued a Snatch Tapes compilation called Snatch Paste and this was followed in 2007 by a Storm Bugs LP entitled Supplementary Benefit featuring the two 7 inch singles as well as tracks from the early cassette releases. 2008 saw "Car Situations (Nasal Passage)" included on the Messthetics Greatest Hiss compilation whilst in 2011 the A Safe Substitute cassette on Snatch Tapes was reissued on red vinyl by Harbinger Records. In 2013, the track "Cash Wash/Eat Good Beans" was included on the seventh and final Anthology of Noise and Electronic Music compilation on Sub Rosa.

In 2013, Storm Bugs made their back catalogue available digitally on Bandcamp and released their first new material in ten years the digital single (or dingle as they named it) "No Nothingness/Triangulation" with an accompanying video. Subsequent dingles were released by the band and brought together on the 2017 release Certified Original and Vintage Fakes.

== Live performances ==
Storm Bugs live appearances have been rare. Un an unadvertised performance was given at Maidstone Art college in 1979 and a further performance in the summer of 1980 in Brenchley Gardens Maidstone, Kent. On that occasion the band included David Jackman on esraj. In 2012 Storm Bugs performed live for the first time in 30 years at the Rammel Weekender in Nottingham alongside other acts such as the New Blockaders and the Sleaford Mods. Reviewing the Weekender in the Wire Magazine, Storm Bugs's contribution was judged by Derek Walmsley to be "everything that's right about the weekend". Other gigs followed in Paris and Belgium and in 2018 at the Contrapop festival in Ramsgate.

== Critical reception ==
Storm Bugs' initial releases were reviewed in the Garageland and DIY Corner sections of the NME and Sounds and in ZigZag magazine however the re-released material has attracted far more attention including from writers such as Simon Reynolds and Ed Pinsent along with coverage in the Wire magazine including a two-page feature in the October 2015 issue (380). Storm Bugs tracks have also received numerous plays on alternative radio stations such as WFMU and Resonance FM.

== Discography ==
=== Albums, singles and EPs ===
- A Safe Substitute – 1980 (Cassette on Snatch Tapes)
- Table Matters – 1980 (7 inch EP on Loop records)
- Storm Bugs – 1980 (Cassette on Snatch Tapes)
- Gift – 1981 (Cassette on Snatch Tapes)
- Metamorphose – 1981 (7 inch single on L'Invitation au Suicide records)
- Lets go outside and get it over – 2001 (CD on Snatch Tapes)
- 'The Bugs are Back – 2002 (7 inch EP on Klanggalerie records)
- Up the middle down the sides – 2005 (LP on Fuestron records)
- Supplementary Benefit – 2007 (LP on Vinyl on Demand records)
- A Safe Substitute – 2011 (LP on Harbinger records – re-issue of the 1980 cassette)
- No Nothingness/Triangulation – 2013 (Digital single on Storm Bugs/Bandcamp)
- Certified Original & Vintage Fakes – 2017 (CDR on Snatch Tapes)
- A Safe Substitute – 2020 (40th anniversary CD re-issue on Klanggalerie)
- Best Before 2027 – 2023 (Digital release via Storm Bugs Bandcamp page)

=== Compilation appearances ===
- "Hodge" on Snatch 1 (1979)
- "Thin Line Flash of Traffic" on Snatch 2 (1980)
- "Cash Wash/Eat Good Beans" on I Hate the Pop Group (2000)
- "Internal Use Only" on Fdsixtyfive (2003)
- "Dull Sound of Breath Inside A Tin" on Snatch Paste (2006)
- "Car Situations (Nasal Passage)" on Messthetics Greatest Hiss: An Introduction to the DIY Cassette Scene 1979–1982 (2008)
- "Cash Wash/Eat Good Beans" on An Anthology Of Noise And Electronic Music / Seventh And Last A-chronology 1930–2012 (2013)
- "Little Bob Minor" and "Hiemal" on Close To The Noise Floor (Formative UK Electronica 1975–1983) (2016)
- "Take it To The Top" on Contra Pop Festival 2018: The Third And Tidal Report (2019)
- "Full Moon in My Pocket (Tail Light)" and "Full Moon in My Pocket (Port Sight)" on Your Song, My Foot! Vol. 3: The 1979 Edition (2019)

Discography sources: Discogs,
