= Final Program (musical group) =

Scottish minimal synth band

- Origin: Stirling, Scotland,
- Genres: synthpop; electronic; minimal wave
- Years active: 1978–1981
- Labels: Program; Anna Logue; Trax; Aztec recordings; Sunset Gun; Vinyl on Demand; SRT; Cherry Red Records
- Past members: Richie Turnbull; Kennie J Young; Ann Droid; Graham Kammack; Al Robertson

Final Program was a pioneering Scottish minimal synth band formed in Stirling in 1978. They are noteworthy as a pioneering influence in the emergence of minimalist electronica synth music in Scotland.

== History ==
=== Formation and early years ===
Formed in Stirling in 1978, the original lineup consisted of Richie Program and Anne Droid. Richie ditched his guitar and went fully electronic when EDP launched the "wasp" synthesiser. Anne had no musical background and she played bass synth. Her real name was Anne Benson\Turnbull. In 1981 the band released the instrumental 7-inch EP "Protect and Survive", which reached 19 in the Futurist chart the first pressing selling out after plays by legendary DJ John Peel. The disc now features in the "Rare Record Price Guide." The Scottish tourist board used The track Trains in their promotional video. The band continued to evolve as Anne left, with Kennie J Young joining as a vocalist, as well as Al Robertson who featured briefly before going on to form "100% Man made Fibre".

Richie and Kennie toured Scotland in the early 80's and produced a 12 track vocal demo album which was circulated as part of the vibrant "Cassette Culture" of the era. Richie Program then joined Sean Kelly and John Sharp of "Those French Girls", disbanding Final program in 1984 to form "Sean Novak" releasing one 12-inch single.

=== Re-emergence 2010-2016 ===
Richie Program relocated to London in the mid 80's to become part of the wider techno music scene. However, the minimalist sound continued to be sought after and valued amongst musical cognoscenti, and in November 2010 Final Program featured alongside Depeche Mode, Soft Cell and New Order as part of a noteworthy DJ mix and playlist "SSG Special: High-Rise Living 78-86 [Part 1] – compiled by The Black Dog & Regis " released on Wednesday, 24 November 2010. "The Black Dog" stated: 'Historically, music only really gets interesting when the British get involved and this was a very British musical revolution.'

Another accolade was the inclusion of Final Program phase One in the Crispy Nuggets mix released on 8 June 2011.

=== Robots, Rockets, Radiation ===
Released on 1 October 2014, "Robots Rockets, Radiation" is an album mastered by Stephan Bornhorst, which provides collectors with the original 7-inch EP tracks plus all 12 tracks from the original vocal demo.

The collection includes the hits "Phase One", "Automation", "Mechanic Dancing", and a vocal version of "Protect and Survive" as well as a cover version of The Stranglers "Hanging Around" and perhaps rather unexpectedly, a surprising interpretation Burt Bacharach's "Raindrops" (keep falling on my head)

=== Official Guide to Scottish Minimal/Synth 1979-1983 ===
Also in 2014 Vinyl on Demand included an extensive selection of Final Program material in a massively definitive 8 record set: "Official Guide to Scottish Minimal/Synth 1979-1983" featuring Alistair Robertson and "100% Man Made Fibre"

Final Program contributed the material for the fourth 12-inch disc in the set:

LP4 FINAL PROGRAM Demos 81/82 / INTER CITY STATIC Love Amongst the Mannequins, 1981

LP4A: FINAL PROGRAM Demos & Compilation-Tracks from 1981/82 (25:16)

- A1 Mechanical Dancing (Demo) 3:50
- A2 Phase One (Demo) 2:34
- A3 Videomatic (Demo) 4:03
- A4 Zero G (Demo) 3:46
- A5 Don't call me lacy (Demo) 2:49
- A6 Cure for Cancer 2:22 (on V/A Horrorbox, TRAX 0282)
- A7 Phase One 2:36 (on V/A Technodeath, TRAX1281, 1981)
- A8 Videophab 3:08 (on V/A Sunset Gun Audiozine No.1, 1981)

=== Close to the Noise Floor ===
In 2016 Final Program's "Protect and Survive" featured on "Close to the Noise Floor: Formative UK Electronica 1975-1984", a Cherry Red Records compilation album of early UK electronica.

Cherry Red records described the importance of the collection: "inspired by the DIY ethos of punk, a quiet revolution took place across the UK in the late 1970s and early 1980s. The rise of the microchip and the advent of affordable synthesisers enabled countless artists for whom guitars, drums and bass had become old hat, and in grubby bedsits, unremarkable living rooms and art school halls across the British Isles, UK electronica was born. The underground, fuelled by cassette exchanges, co-operative vinyl compilations and a thriving mail order network, quickly began to stretch the boundaries of sonic experimentation."

A review by Pitchfork further develops the theme: "The primitivist phase of the synthesizer came after the sophisticated start. In the late 1970s, cheaper machines like the Wasp became available; they were also compact, portable, and relatively user-friendly compared with their bulky predecessors. This democratization of electronics happened to coincide with rock’s own self-conscious return to juvenile basics in the form of punk. .....Close To the Noise Floor is a 4×CD survey of the excitingly messy birth of British electronica during the late '70s and early '80s. ....."Minimal synth" works as a shorthand tag for Close To the Noise Floor's remit, although the scope of the trawl is actually wider and more disparate than what that term tends to signify, taking in electro-punk, industrial, synthpop, dark ambient, and more. Rather than use generic focus as an organizing principle, the anthology achieves coherence through sticking with a single country—Britain—when it could have easily have swept across the equally active European scene or harvested the scattered but significant American exponents like John Bender and Nervous Gender.

The national focus makes sense historically, in so far as the UK scene was catalyzed by half-a-dozen native outfits who released debut singles within a few months of each other ...

Close To the Noise Floor provides a fascinating overview of the formative years of British home-studio electronica: groups who were precursors in spirit, if not direct lineage, to the techno and IDM artists of the '90s."

Metacritic gave the 4 cd boxed set a score of 89.

=== Legacy ===
In May 2016 Record Collector magazine (Issue 453) as part of a review of "Close to the Noise Floor" by Oregano Rathbone pays particular homage to the original Final Program track "Protect and Survive" first released 35 years earlier: "Whatever nexus of elements provided the impetus, it’s significant how almost homely so much of the chilly electronica produced in that era now seems. "Adorable" is emphatically not what any of them would have been going for; but listening to, for example, In The Room by Third Door From The Left, or the earnest and utterly wonderful Protect And Survive by Final Program – "WHAT’S ALL THIS I HEAR ABOUT NUCLEAR FALLOUT?” proclaims vocalist Richie Program, in a stentorian android monotone – the envisioned dystopia was clearly our dystopia, a comfortably familiar landscape bordered by Frisbee-trapping pylons, rough-cast Bauhaus concrete and the Poundsaver monophonic synths that acted as sonic emojis for The Tomorrow People."

In the late 1980s Richie Program relocated to London, spending some years as an independent fashion designer and playing a semi-opaque role in various social and cultural developments including the anti-poll tax movement. During this period he established himself as a DJ and promoter under the pseudonym Richie 303.

== Discography ==
- 7-inch EP "Protect and Survive" (1980) (released on program records catalogue number final001)
- DJ Mix High-Rise Living 78-86 [Part 1 (2010) (compiled by The Black Dog & Regis)
- DJ Mix: Various Artists "Crispy Nuggets" (2011)
- "Robots Rockets, Radiation" (2014) (Anna Logue records)
- "Official Guide to Scottish Minimal/Synth 1979-1983" (2014) (Vinyl on Demand)
- Various Artists – Close to the Noise Floor: Formative UK Electronica 1975-1984 (2016) (Cherry Red Records CRCDBOX 24 [4CD] )
