= International Sound Communication =

International Sound Communication (frequently abbreviated as I.S.C.) was a series of compilation cassettes, compiled and distributed as a mail art project by Andi Xport from Peterborough, England, in the mid-1980s. Fifteen volumes were issued.

The series was intended to provide an outlet for any kind of music from any country in the world. Most artists who appeared were not signed to a record label, but had released their music privately on cassettes sold via mail, and these were often the source of the material that appeared on the compilations. All volumes came with a list of contact addresses, with the exception of artists from "Iron Curtain" or Soviet Union countries whose addresses were not published, to protect them from government persecution, as the "importation" of Western culture and influences, and communication with artists outside the Soviet Union, without government approval were generally illegal. In those cases, a contact address for an associate outside of the Soviet Union was provided. As stated on the inserts, "All bands and individuals featured on I.S.C. comps have more music available, so get in touch now!" A slogan, "Communicate to Create" often appeared.

In addition to compiling the series, Andi Xport recorded under the name Man's Hate, which was also the name of his cassette label which distributed I.S.C. (plus 5 cassette albums by Man's Hate). Xport was also a member of APF Brigade, and The Peace & Freedom Band. Xport claims that more than 3,000 tapes were sent to him, and many had to be stored under his bed due to space limitations.

Released on the same date as volume 13, an extra volume appeared as The Noise Collective which, although presented as an artist name, was actually another compilation project. All tracks were collaborations between two or more artists, most of whom had appeared previously on I.S.C. The collaborations were accomplished by having the artists send each other unfinished recordings through the mail. The tracks were edited to overlap and segue, forming a continuous suite on each side of the tape.

Volumes 1 to 8 were C-60 (60-minute) tapes, with a cover price of £1.00. The remaining volumes, including The Noise Collective, were C-90 with a cover price of £1.50. Volumes 1 to 9 used a fold-out insert, while volume 10 had a cardboard insert separate from the track list and contacts sheet. Starting with volume 11 (and including The Noise Collective), the outer cover was a cardboard sleeve wrapped around the plastic jewel case.

== Track listings ==
I.S.C. No. 1 (on front)
International Sound Communication (on spine)
not dated, issued 1984 or 1985
60 minutes
Comment on cover: "Music from Belgium, England, Japan, Norway, Scotland, U.S.A. & Wales. All the hits of the 80s on one great cassette!"

Track	Artist	Country	Title
Side one
1	Viscera	USA	"Field Glasses"
2	Slaughter Tradition	Wales	"Passion Revolt"
3	Magthea & Insanity	Belgium	"Magthea & Insanity" (excerpt)
4	Maybe Tomorrow	England	"Undercontrol"
5	Opera for Infantry	England	"Europe the Haunted Land"
6	Unovidual	Belgium	"Gregorica Opstatica"
7	Kowa	Japan	"Fool & Poor" (excerpt)
Side two
1	Absolute Body Control	Belgium	"Waving Hands"
2	Tender Loving Care	England	"Wasted Years"
3	F/i	USA	"Is It Worth It?"
4	Political Asylum	Scotland	"Cat's Eyes"
5	Man's Hate	England	"Flash of Flesh"
6	Datakluss	Norway	"(untitled)"
7	J. R. Smets	Belgium	"Take a Step to the Left..."
8	Ray the Poet	England	"Life's Destruction" (live)
9	Ray the Poet	England	"1984 (is Here)"
10	The Zanstones	USA	"The Subtle Art of Puddle Pushing"
11	Disstorrsshunn	"?????"	"Pain in My Head" (excerpt)

I.S.C. 2 (on front)
International Sound Communication 2 (on spine)
16 March 1985
60 minutes
Comment on cover: "Ape shit maaan!"

Track	Artist	Country	Title
Side one
1	Partners in Crime	England	"Falklands Factor"
2	Last Exit	England	"Funeral March"
3	4 Thousand Million	Australia	"We are Not Lemmings"
4	4 Thousand Million	Australia	"Advance Australia!! Where?"
5	Mass of Black	England	"Dead and Broke"
6	Final	England	"Vomit Eat"
7	Zanstones	USA	"God Come in the Flesh"
8	Zanstones	USA	"Possublee Abnormul"
9	S.O.D.	Sweden	"I Don't Want"
10	S.O.D.	Sweden	"Tānk Realistiskt"
11	S.O.D.	Sweden	"Let the Animals Live"
12	Magthea and Straggianopff 99	Belgium	"Nachtmerrie der Goden" (excerpt)
Side two
1	Stupids	England	"So Much Fun"
2	Stupids	England	"Waste Away"
3	La Masque	England	"Ethi'hope'ia"
4	A Technicolor Dream	Norway	"The Great Arcade"
5	A Technicolor Dream	Norway	"Closing Walls of Karma"
6	Dennis Carleton	USA	"Fill in the Blank"
7	Western Front	Wales	"Who's Girl Now?"
8	Ulf Knudson	Norway	"Hostland"
9	The Ym-Tribe	Norway	"Vi: Landet"
10	Unknownmix	Switzerland	"Jungle Jive" (excerpt)

I.S.C. 3 (on front)
International Sound Communiqué 3 (on spine)
22 April 1985
60 minutes

Track	Artist	Country	Title
Side one
1	Political Asylum	Scotland	"Fresh Hate" (live)
2	Autentisk Film	Norway	"Offer"
3	Skogvokterne	Norway	"(untitled)"
4	Lister	Norway	"Elifantz"
5	Mōrkelagt Bevegelse	Norway	"Compared to an Image"
6	Men of Courage	Norway	"Confronted With Life"
7	Miasma	England	"This is Halloween"
8	Sicky Spread	England	"New Forest Butterfly Farm"
9	Sicky Spread	England	"Teenage Sex"
Side two
1	Master / Slave Relationship	USA	"I Feel Sick"
2	The Phallacy	USA	"The Phallacy"
3	Fremskrittet	Norway	"The Forest"
4	Fremskrittet	Norway	"Justice II"
5	Absolute Body Control	Belgium	"Is There an Exit" (live)
6	Earths Epitaph	Wales	"Yesterdays Child"
7	Savage Circle	Italy	"Bleeding Throat"
8	The Bristles	Sweden	"Nuclear Power"
9	Scientific Creative Intelligence	USA	"Music for the Expanding Universe" (excerpt)

I.S.C. 4
Track list not available
List of artists (from advertisement): The Klinik; Unknownmix; Bloody Hypocrites; F/i; The Dreg; Unovidual; Electro Hippies; D.V.A. Minuta Mrznje; Les Bouseaux Pychedeliques; The Affairs; If, Bwana; Anathema; Synthetic Productions; Miasma; Pseudo Code; The Submensa's; M.A.L.; Narzisse
List of countries: Belgium; England; France; Northern Ireland; Switzerland; USA; West Germany; Yugoslavia

International Sound Communication 5 (on front)
I.S.C. 5 (on spine)
27 July 1985
60 minutes

Track	Artist	Country	Title
Side one
1	Antibiøtic	France	"Les Revoltes du Bounty"
2	Philippe "Hot Bip" Laurent	France	"Rapide 4"
3	Ray Pearson	England	"The Media are Free"
4	Zone Verte	Belgium	"Pas de Panik"
5	Narzisse	Belgium	"Dogmamix"
6	Symbol of Freedom	Wals	"Seen It Before"
7	Unovidual	Belgium	"Left on the Shelf"
8	George Dimeco	USA	"It Could've Been Me" (excerpt)
Side two
1	Máma Bubo	Czechoslovakia	"20 Stoleti"
2	Vita Noctis	Belgium	"Hade"
3	X Ray Pop	France	"La Machine à Rëver"
4	X Ray Pop	France	"Alcool"
5	Terry Gray	England	"Something You Said"
6	Barry Edgar Pilcher	Wales	"Who Will Rouse the Sleepfish?"
7	New 7th Music	England	"Live at the Recession" (excerpt)
8	Berry Weinberg and the Blues Chargers	USA	"Somebody Get Me a Beer"
9	George Dimeco	USA	"It Could've Been Me" (2nd excerpt)

I.S.C. 6
10 October 1985
60 minutes

Track	Artist	Country	Title
Side one
1	Sombrero Galaxy	USA	"Existence"
2	If, Bwana	USA	"Pursuit of Happiness"
3	Zanstones	USA	"Green Waiter During Maybe Someday Suite"
4	JD3	USA	"Oh My God"
5	Pete Bell	USA	"Big Physics"
6	Controlled Substances	USA	"Gleaming Towers"
7	Kevin Lytle	USA	"Castaways 1943 (excerpt)"
Side two
1	Paul Kelday	England	"Balance of Terror"
2	Barry Edgar Pilcher + James Hill	Wales / England	"Saxophones of Reality" (excerpt)
3	Barry Edgar Pilcher + Clive Kingsley	Wales / USA	"Operation Jollification for Jane" (excerpt)
4	Barry Edgar Pilcher + Robert Rich	Wales / USA	"Saxophone Distortion" (excerpt)
5	The Day Rosemary Said She Was Pregnant	Belgium	"The Age"
6	Rat	England	"A Statement"
7	No Unauthorized	France	"Plus Personne"
8	Final	England	"A Message to Man"
9	Föreign Legiön	Wales	"Message From Nowhere"
10	Vacuūm	Holland	"Meat"
11	Vox Paris	France	"Jamais Trop Vite"
12	Crawling From the Wreckage	USA	"Plastic People" (excerpt live on radio)

I.S.C. 7
Track list not available
List of artists (from advertisement): Alan Cornelius; Post War; Mystery Hearsay; Last Rites; Headcleaners; Famlende Forsok; Paranoid Visions; N.B.N.; Opera Multisteel; The Apostles; Face in the Crowd; Fever Heroes; Celestial Orgy; In ' 8; Compulsion Brothers; C'llaaps
List of countries: England; France; Ireland; Japan; Norway; Scotland; USA; Wales

International Sound Communication Compilation Volume Number Eight
1 January 1986
60 minutes

Track	Artist	Country	Title
Side one
1	Comando Bruno	Spain	"De Tu Miedo (Of Your Fear)"
2	James Morrison	USA	"Vinyl Junkie"
3	Klaus Groh	West Germany	"Try is Life"
4	Chumbawamba	England	"Rap"
5	Danbert Nobacon	England	"Shovelling Shit"
6	Danbert Nobacon	England	"Westbury Toilets"
7	Danbert Nobacon	England	"Police State Blues"
8	De Fabriek	Holland	"(untitled)"
9	Society's Rejects	Wales	"It's Your Life"
10	Miroslaw Rajkowski	Poland	"Physical No. 2" (excerpt)
Side two
1	Luca Miti	Italy	"The Preceding Chat"
2	Bill Pritchard	England	"Black Souls Under White Skies"
3	Paul Kelday	England	"Plight of the Butterfly of Peace in the Web of Hatred"
4	Dissollutio Humani Generis	Italy	"Il Grande Freddo"
5	The Mock Turtles	England	"One Fine Day"
6	Low Class	Belgium	"The Alienation Ballade"
7	The Horsemen	Scotland	"Hard to Grasp"
8	Filthy Christians	Sweden	"Mas-core"
9	Cauchy 138	Belgium	"Obligation"
10	Barry and Eve Pilcher + Friends	Wales	"Spikey Hair" (excerpt)

International Sound Communication Volume Number Nine
22 February 1986
90 minutes
Comment on cover: "It's like an electric chair in your living room!"

Track	Artist	Country	Title
Side one
1	Magthea	Belgium	"Neptune Wakes Up"
2	E.S.P. Kinetic	England	"Metropoline"
3	Lyke Wake	Italy	"Bury the Dead for Fear"
4	Marc Pira	France	"(untitled)"
5	Areknuteknyterne	Norway	"Boiling Water"
6	Boiler House	England	"Four Star Chrome Maniac"
7	Statement	England	"King of the Castle"
8	Flushed Beyond Recall	England	"Polywater"
9	Urbain Autopsy	France	"Dis Leur (Dealer)"
10	D.C.A.	Japan	"(untitled)"
11	Dead S.P.K.	Japan	"Lust Dead"
12	Doc Wör Mirran	West Germany	"On My Walk to Work"
13	Doc Wör Mirran	West Germany	"Puddle"
14	Doc Wör Mirran	West Germany	"Living Oddly in a World"
15	Doc Wör Mirran	West Germany	"The Pen"
16	Doc Wör Mirran	West Germany	"MacDonald's is Pornography"
17	The Hive	England	"Bleed"
18	Paul Rance & the Peace & Freedom Band	England	"Love Genocide"
19	Costes Cassette	France	"Mother & Father Singing"
20	Jeff Laryngo	France	"Stop-Gap"
Side two
1	F:A.R. Prosthesis	Italy	"Enfant Prodige"
2	Diet & Iko Schutte	West Germany	"Once I Was a Swallow"
3	Jive Kappelle	West Germany	"Eante 23"
4	M C H Band	Czechoslovakia	"Vylexl do Tretiho Patra" (live, excerpt)
5	Neurotica	West Germany	"Hell's Bells" (live)
6	Zeitgeist & the 7 Year Itch	USA	"Motionfilled"
7	Ark & the Ologists	USA	"Junk"
8	The Disturbed	Scotland	"Warfare" (live)
9	Swinebolt #45	USA	"(untitled)"
10	Moly	France	"C'est est Difficile d'Avoir Rien a Dire"
11	Denier du Culte	France	"Gangrene"
12	The Joke Project	Japan	"Don't Stop Call Me"
13	Memphis 10 SC	Norway	"Be Bop"

I.S.C. 10
6 April 1986
90 minutes
Comment on cover: "Stop pushing, there's enough copy's for everyone"

Track	Artist	Country	Title
Side one
1	Split Second	Belgium	"Resignation"
2	Twilight Ritual	Belgium	"A Perfect Memory in Here"
3	Syndrome	Belgium	"Night Talk"
4	Linear Movement	Belgium	"Wired to the Machine's"
5	Photodrama	Wales	"Dan Dare - Where are You?"
6	Ideas Beyond Filth	England	"Rollercoaster"
7	Agencement	Japan	"Kazbuz"
8	Crawling With Tarts	USA	"Smak"
9	Ajynytyv	England	"Integration" (live, excerpt)
10	Die Schlaffen Affen	West Germany	"Back to Rock 'n' Roll"
11	Do Easy	England	"Knife in My Side"
12	Rudolf's Rache	West Germany	"Sommersprossensesicht"
Side two
1	L.D.50	England	"Your Country Needs You"
2	L.O.S.P.	France	"Life on the Floor"
3	Katharsis	USA	"Content Discontent"
4	Mystery Plane	England	"Find Somebody"
5	Wer7	England	"I Was Not a Jew"
6	Modern Art	England	"Monochrome Dance"
7	La Créme de la Crime	Belgium	"Lipstick"
8	10T	Japan	"Pandra Music"
9	Detwiehl	Holland	"Himalaya"
10	The Marvellous Roofs	England	"Them Scarecrows"
11	Len Liggins	England	"Leningrad"
12	Len Liggins	England	"All the Dead Men"
13	Solomonoff, Von Hoffmannstalh and Hoffman	USA	"Serenade in the Night"
14	Terry Gray	England	"Faith"
15	Stress	England	"Fist Comes Down"
16	F/i	USA	"Echo River"

International Sound Communication Eleven
26 July 1986
90 minutes
Comment on cover: "What are YOU doing to protect yourself from: (Misinformation... Half-truths... Mind Rot...) MEDIA BURN, the Nation's leading mental crippler - Nothing? Then Turn On, Tune In, And Drop Out With I.S.C."

Track	Artist	Country	Title
Side one
1	Before Me	Sweden	"Former Individual"
2	Before Me	Sweden	"Hello I'm Back"
3	Before Me	Sweden	"Try Meg"
4	Compos Mentis	New Zealand	"No Practice No Play"
5	Schaum der Tage	West Germany	"Musique de l'Indifférence"
6	Cottage Industry	Canada	"Point on a Hill"
7	Mass of Humanity	Canada	"Nothing Past the Swan's (theme)"
8	The Reverend Mark C. & the Z Funk	USA	"Beans Over Brazzaville"
9	Anathema	England	"The Anti Apartheid Rap"
10	Basquadeck Shelf	England	"The Undying Factory of Resistance"
11	Heavy Discipline	England	"Heads of State"
12	Stasis	England	"Gerna - dorfia"
13	Jajje Sekoilia	Finland	"Five Penny Noise Opera"
14	The Hatefuls	France	"Unknown"
15	Bogart & Comando Bruno	West Germany	"Compulsion to Terror"
16	Seiei Jack	Japan	"Love Me Do"
17	Mystery-X	USA	"(untitled)" (excerpt)
Side two
1	Mystery-X	USA	"(untitled)" (second excerpt)
2	The Psychological Warfare Branch	USA	"Capitalist Punishment"
3	No Unauthorised	France	"Guerilla" (live)
4	Inpull Caco	Japan	"Kirel Ni Naritai"
5	Synthetic Products	USA	"Nuclear Age"
6	Autumn	Belgium	"Doll Cries to Me"
7	Unovidual & Tara Cross	Belgium	"Like I Am / Comme - Je Suis"
8	Dietrich Cortier	Belgium	"La Chitara Schela"
9	Lust & Passion	Belgium	"The Day Before"
10	The Day Rosemary Said She Was Pregnant	Belgium	"Imaginary Girl"
11	Cauchy 138 & Riot System	Belgium	"Don't Talk to Me"
12	The Next World	England	"Too Many Hells"
13	Jajje Sekoilia	Finland	"Ice Hockey Jesus"

International Sound Communication Twelve
18 October 1986
90 minutes

Track	Artist	Country	Title
Side one
1	The Detective	England	"Green Eyes"
2	The High Tech Pagodas	England	"The First Stage"
3	The Dead Goldfish Ensemble	England	"Grey Earls" (excerpt)
4	Hapunkt Fix & Friends	West Germany	"I'm Thru"
5	Dora Benditz	West Germany	"Dance a Waltz"
6	Gunni	Iceland	"Endalokin (The End)"
7	S. H. Draumur	Iceland	"Eg Dansa Vid Lik"
8	Mario Marzidovsek	Yugoslavia	"Blast Furnace"
9	The Slips	France	"Fuck Vos Gueules"
10	R. S. Pearson	USA	"After the Crayon Rains"
11	Schlafengarten	USA	"And When U Sleep"
12	Hum	England	"Daring and Raring"
13	V-Sor,X	England	"Protection the Game"
14	S-Ink	Switzerland	"Elephant"
15	Z'aubérpine	Belgium	"L'armée"
16	Z'aubérpine	Belgium	"Anti-christ"
Side two
1	Landishkrill	England	"The Eye"
2	Stalinstrasse	Poland	"Józef Stalin" (live in Castel, 11 July 1986)
3	Natchniony Tractor	Poland	"Red Plague" (live in Castel, 11 July 1986)
4	Sismoid and Tara Cross	France / USA	"Charlie"
5	Les Temps Anciens	Italy	"Much Farther Away"
6	Opera	Italy	"Broken"
7	Tom Burris	USA	"Blue"
8	The Starkman	England	"Disturbing the Peace"
9	S.O.R.	Yugoslavia	"Protekcija Zivali"
10	Tanze-die-Gemuse	France	"Contact"
11	Klimperei	France	"Kleine"
12	Ashes and Diamonds	Scotland	"Available" (live)
13	Allen Densen	Canada	"Airports 1/3"
14	Viktor Pavel	West Germany	"(untitled)" (excerpt)

I S C Thirteen
21 March 1987
90 minutes
Comment on cover: "Unlucky for some"

Track	Artist	Country	Title
Side one
1	Toshiyuki Hiraoka	Japan	"Koshikawa"
2	Rolando Chia	Mexico	"Gol" (excerpt)
3	A Low Fashion	West Germany	"2 Views Inside"
4	The Frog is Dead	West Germany	"Kill Gaddafi Kill"
5	Blue But True	West Germany	"In the Swirl of Life"
6	Taste of Decay	West Germany	"Factory"
7	Yellow Flip	Austria	"The Underground Masturbator"
8	The Paisley-hued Eucalyptus Corkscrew Pavillion	USA	"A Prophet on a Distant Planet My Mind Explodes"
9	The Why Band	England	"Life on the Beat / Aura Eaters"
10	Darren Copeland	Canada	"Color in Motion"
11	Iron Brotherhood	Scotland	"Night on the Tiles"
12	Die Wohnhaft	France	"Souvenirs in Our Times"
13	Alien Planetscapes	USA	"Spacerock" (excerpt)
Side two
1	Paulo Bruscky & Caito Marcondes	Brazil	"Música para Electroencefalograma"
2	Syntax Error	Canada	"Elizabeth"
3	Tone Poets	USA	"Return of the Squeeze People"
4	Chaos S.A.	South Africa	"When the Battle is Over"
5	Lost Front	South Africa	"From Protest to Resistance"
6	Blind Gut	Czechoslovakia	"Icebreaker"
7	L.S.D.	Italy	"La Pioggia / Il Fumo Della Follila"
8	Gargantua	USA	"Rex & Sid & Nancy"
9	Blyth Power	England	"Folsam Prison Blues" (live)
10	The Astronauts	England	"Latin & Greek" (live)
11	Wat Tyler	England	"Hops and Barley" (live)
12	Hysteria Ward	England	"Peace Song"
13	Apple	USA	"Peace is Possible"
14	The Mousehounds	England	"Like a Child (in the City)" (live)
15	Thomas Struszka	West Germany	"The Intro / Flucht aus der Disco"
16	Thatcher On Acid	England	"Guess Who's Running the Show"

The Noise Collective
Hello! Hello! Can Anyone Hear Me?
21 March 1987
90 minutes
Each track is a collaboration between two or more artists.

Track	Artist	Country	Title
Side one
1	Allen Densen; Terry Gray	Canada; England	"Void"
2	John Graham; Terry Gray; Moses	unknown England unknown	"Genesis"
3	Inpull Caco; Allen Densen	Japan; Canada	"A Dropped Rose"
4	Barry Edgar Pilcher; Allen Densen	Wales; Canada	"Hello Piece"
5	Jezoz Hopkins; Angus Brown; Terry Gray	unknown unknown England	"Hello! Hello! Can You Hear Me?"
6	Inpull Caco; Crawling With Tarts; Phil Rodgers	Japan; USA unknown	"12.16.86"
7	Andi Xport; Inpull Caco	England; Japan	"Cascade"
8	Ruund Janssen; Viktor Pavel	unknown West Germany	"Heidi's Illness"
9	Flushed Beyond Recall; Katharsis	England; USA	"Nowhere in a Hurry"
10	Fenner Castner; Andi Xport; Zan Hoffman; Barry Edgar Pilcher	unknown England; USA; Wales	"Slow Death of Rock 'n' Roll"
Side two
1	No Unauthorised; Barry Edgar Pilcher; Alice Rainbow Pilcher	France; Wales; Wales	"X-tract (part 1)"
2	Berserker; Katharsis	unknown USA	"Kathy Goes Berserk (part 1)"
3	Tom Burris; Allen Densen	USA; Canada	"Bump Cars"
4	Berserker; Katharsis	unknown USA	"Kathy Goes Berserk (part 2)"
5	Inpull Caco; Crawling With Tarts	Japan; USA	"Return to 16"
6	No Unauthorised; Barry Edgar Pilcher; Alice Rainbow Pilcher	France; Wales; Wales	"X-tract (part 2)"
7	Inpull Caco; Andi Xport	Japan; England	"Train From Japan to England"
8	Katharsis; Iron Brotherhood	USA; Scotland	"Bated Breath"
9	Andi Xport; Barry Edgar Pilcher	England; Wales	"Lost on the Mountain"
10	Paul Rance; Andrew Bruce	England; England	"Three Men in London"
11	Barry Edgar Pilcher; Allen Densen; Jezoz Hopkins; Angus Brown; Terry Gray	Wales; Canada unknown unknown England	"Hello! (reprise)"

International Sound Communication Compilation Volume Number Fourteen
not dated, issued 1987
90 minutes
Comment on cover: "Load up with I.S.C., get a copy now!"

Track	Artist	Country	Title
Side one
1	En Manque d'Autre	Italy	"Je t'Adore"
2	Spheric Corner	West Germany	"No More Machines"
3	Le Pendu	England	"Strength Through Rage, Neptune"
4	Ethnic Acid	England	"Cut One"
5	JFK	England	"Volunteer"
6	Jazz Bacon Slicer	England	"Godstar"
7	Aneurisma	Italy	"Dierum Festorum Traditionum"
8	La Sonorite Jaune	France	"Patrick McGoohan"
9	Context	West Germany	"Product 9"
10	Rhetoric	England	"Take My Life" (live)
11	Eli Talgam	Israel	"Sonate for Small Organ & Receiver"
Side two
1	The Spinoza Sisters	England	"Public Mass & Cantata"
2	The Severn Bores	England	"Guitars 2"
3	Eneik-shis-doh	Japan	"Force"
4	Aritasamansa	Japan	"Soul Train"
5	SD	Japan	"Cavellini"
6	Rabid Defiance	Canada	"Acting"
7	Noche en Bombay	Spain	"Good-time Halma"
8	Extranos Dias Felices	Spain	"Afonia II"
9	Psy Falange	Spain	"Live 31.3.83"
10	Die Socken	Austria	"Africa"
11	Rattus Rexx	West Germany	"Feed for the Hungry"
12	Dreaming of Beauty	Canada	"Pieces of Me"
13	Wilde Spiele	West Germany	"Ich Geh Wiedor Weg"
14	The Wickermen	England	"Gub Introduction Time" (live)

I.S.C. 15
Track list not available

== See also ==
- Cassette culture
