= Konstruktivits =

British industrial band

Konstruktivists
- Also known as: Konstruktivists, Konstruktivist
- Genres: Industrial
- Years active: 1982–present
- Labels: Flowmotion; Third Mind; Interior Recordings
- Members: Glenn Michael Wallis; Mark Crumby
- Past members: Dr. R. Alcapone Shiells; Elena Colvée; Gary Levermore; Joseph Ahmed; Lawrence Burton; Pilar Pinillos
- Website: konstruktivists.com

Konstruktivists is a British industrial band. Formed in 1982, they were mostly active in the 1980s, with recording activity continuing until today.

The band was formed by Glenn Michael Wallis from his previous band Heute, a krautrock-influenced trio. 1990s members were Glenn Michael Wallis, Mark Crumby, Lawrence Burton, Joseph Ahmed, and R. Alcapone Shiells.

Glenn Michael Wallis worked as musician on early releases by Whitehouse, he worked solo under the name of Vagina Dentata Organ with permission by Jordi Valls, and he was member of the band projects Dark Union, Heute, The Murray Fontana Orchestra as a side-project of Hafler Trio.

Mark Crumby was member of the bands Ghost Actor, Mitra Mitra, Oppenheimer MKII, and Statik.

Early associations between the band and the likes of Throbbing Gristle and Chris & Cosey cemented them as a member of the early industrial music scene, but did little for their success. Musically, Konstruktivists ranged across a spectrum of styles from noise to ambient to more beat-driven music. After a short hiatus in the late eighties, the album Forbidden introduced a more accessible sound in the tracks "Tic, Tac, Toe," "Hurts So Good," and "She Loves It."

In 2000, Wallis changed the band's name to Konstruktivist, with the spelling Konstruktivists also being used. During the last years Wallis and Crumby run Konstruktivists as a duo.

== Discography ==
=== Albums ===
- A Dissembly (Flowmotion LP, 1982)
- Psykho Genetika (Third Mind Records TM02 LP, 1983)
- Black December (Third Mind Records TMLP05 LP, 1984)
- Glennascaul (Sterile Records SR10 LP, 1985)
- Live at the King Charles Ballroom (Harsh Reality Music HR46 cassette, 1985)
- Spanish Movements (Harsh Reality Music HR11 cassette, 1986; Alternate Media Tapes ALMED143 cassette, 1989)
- NKVD Compilation (with NKVD and Vagina Dentata Organ) (Audiofile Tapes aT77 cassette, 1989)
- Forbidden (NKVD OGPU002 CD, 1992)
- Persona Non Grata (Interior Recordings INT CD 002, 1997)
- Dark Odyssey (self-release, 2006)
- Anarchic Avcadia (Exklageto 12 CD, 2015)
- Fluxus +/- (with Foltergaul & Kommissar Hjuler & Mama Baer (Psych.KG 543 LP, 2020)

=== Compilation appearances ===
- "Beirut" (live) on Untitled (Requiem Productions cassette)
- "Andropov '84" on The Elephant Table Album (Xtract Xx001 2×LP, 1983)
- "Shadows of White Sand" on Cadavres Exquis (Chimik Communications cassette, 1984)
- "How You Say" on Funky Alternatives Three (Concrete Productions/Pinpoint Records CD, 1989)
- "Black on Black" on Rising from the Red Sand Vol. 1 (RRRecords/Statutory Tapes STATAP 09 A cassette)
- "Masonik 1" on Rising from the Red Sand Vol. 3 (RRRecords/Statutory Tapes STATAP 09 C cassette)
