= Die Tödliche Doris =

Performance art and music group

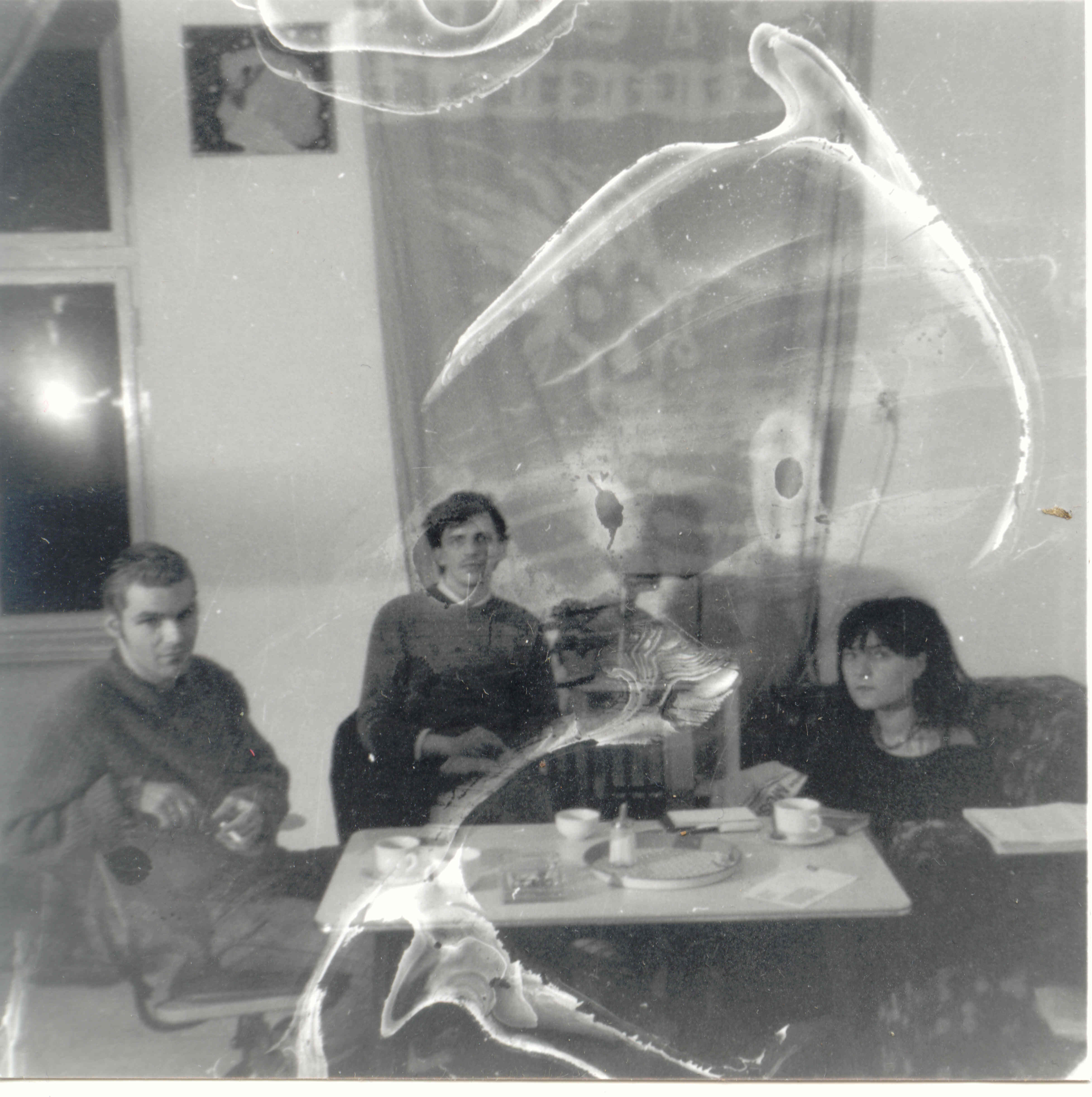
Die Tödliche Doris in 1983. From left to right: Utermöhlen, Müller, Kruse

Die Tödliche Doris (Deadly Doris; a pun on tödliche Dosis, meaning lethal dose) was a performance art and music group based in West Berlin from 1980 to 1987. It was founded by band members Wolfgang Müller and Nikolaus Utermöhlen and later joined by Käthe Kruse, Chris Dreier, Dagmar Dimitroff and Tabea Blumenschein.

== Biography ==
Die Tödliche Doris was part of the Geniale Dilletanten movement (Ingenious Dilletantes (spelling error intentional)), a merger of the new wave and post-punk scene, which combined influences like Frieder Butzmann, Einstürzende Neubauten and Malaria!. The head of the band, author, musician and artist Wolfgang Müller, wrote the book Geniale Dilletanten for the Merve publishing house. This was known for the first German publisher of French postmodern philosophers.

Rather than constructing a consistent identity, typically essential for pop music groups, Die Tödliche Doris challenged the notion of "convention" or "stereotype". Instead, they tried with each music piece and production not to follow a "style" or "image". Inspired by the post-structuralism of Baudrillard, Foucault, Guattarri and Lyotard, Die Tödliche Doris want to deConstruct ![sic] a sculpture, made by sounds. This musical, amusical or non-musical invisible sculpture should become the body of Doris itself.

The first 12-inch LP of Die Tödliche Doris has no title, but is known as 7 tödliche Unfälle im Haushalt (7 deadly accidents in household). Afterwards they published the LP "Die Tödliche Doris" (1981). On this LP are 13 tracks, which seems to have nothing in common: a "funny" song followed by a "serious" song, followed by a "banal" one, a "cruel" one, a "soft" one, a "noisy" one etc. Nothing seems to fit together, all styles or themes are strictly separated from one another. So Doris consists - like human beings - of a lot of different, contradictory characteristics, which exist in one body, but not co-instantaneously.

Because it is not possible to re-enact this concept of a further LP, now the band begin to deConstruct the medium "vinyl-record" itself. With their following project, Die Tödliche Doris and her head, the philosopher and artist Wolfgang Müller broke the convention of a normal record-producing. Called, Chöre & Soli (1983–84), it looked like a five-vinyl-LP box, but contained eight small doll-records, a doll-record player with battery and a booklet. The songs lasted just 20 seconds and were of poor quality. This box is one of the most searched-for items among record collectors today. The plan of the band was that no reviewers would compare the music from their first LP with the second: "We want to become the most independent band of all independent bands–even independent from a usual record player," Wolfgang Müller said in an interview: "But also independent from music-reviews and critics, which want to put you in her sound- and identity-system."

The band's fourth album, Unser Debüt (Our Debut), was perceived as a new wave pop album. It was published in 1984. This record played on popularity-seeking among other bands as a central musical theme. The music tried to sound "opportunistic", "ambitious", and overtly tried to "please" the audience. Doris-head Wolfgang Müller said this idea was born as a result of the coming-up atmosphere of becoming commercially successful, which has got since 1983 a noticeable influence of the West-Berlin Ingenious Dilettantes Scene around Einstürzende Neubauten, Malaria and others. Unser Debut received many bad reviews, though some writers in Belgium and Canada identified the music of the LP as "a parody about commercialism and conformance".

One year later, the LP Sechs (Six) was produced, the musical opposite of Unser Debüt. It was very puritan, abstract music, artistic and hermetic. Many reviewers thought that the band had come back to their "experimental" roots again.

Actually, both records were recorded at the same time in the same studio at Atatak, Düsseldorf. Their tracks have exactly the same lengths on each face a and b. Unser Debut and sechs are full of relations between texts, sounds and contents. Also the covers relate and communicate in between colours, lyrics and images. But in public, nobody knows or find out, that both records a "fitting together". One year after Sechs was published, Die Tödliche Doris published a poster, where they announced having produced a completely independent, non-commercial record, "the first invisible record of the world", created in the head of listeners by playing the album Unser Debüt simultaneously with Sechs. Thus, Die Tödliche Doris created an additional, invisible 5th album in between Unser Debüt (their fourth) and Sechs (the sixth).

== Discography ==
- Der siebenköpfige Informator, 1980
- Das typische Ding, 1981
- Tabea und Doris dürfen doch wohl noch Apache tanzen, 1981
- no title, known as 7 tödliche Unfälle im Haushalt, 1981
- no title, 1982
- Die Tödliche Doris Live im SO 36, 1983
- Chöre & Soli, 1983
- Chöre & Soli live im Delphi-Palast, 1984
- Unser Debüt, 1984
- Naturkatastrophen, 1984
- Die Über-Doris, 1985
- sechs, 1986
- Liveplaybacks, 1986
