= Portion Control (band) =

British electro industrial project

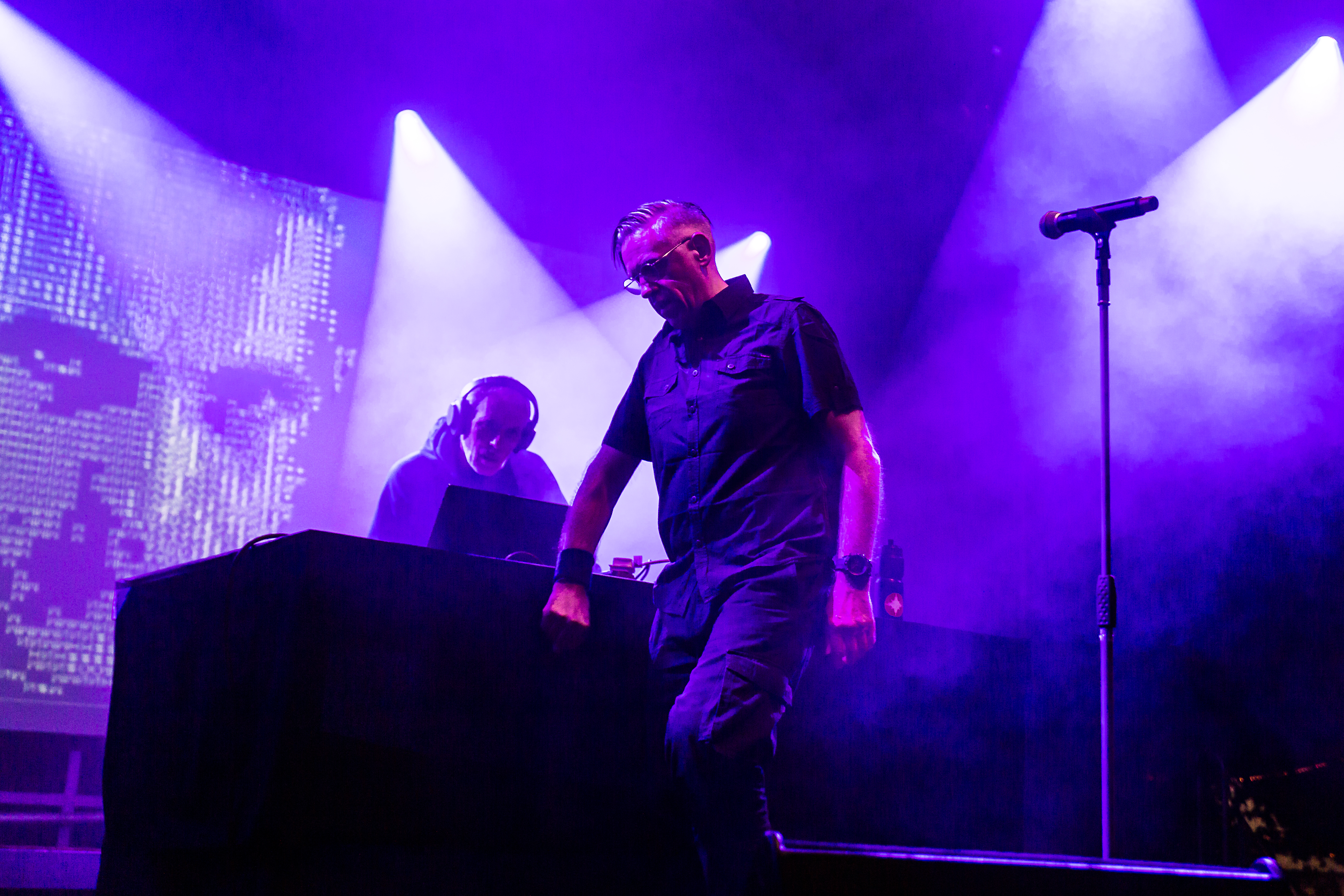
- Portion Control at Nocturnal Culture Night 14 2019

Background information
- Origin: London, England
- Genres: Electronic; industrial; EBM
- Years active: 1979–1987; 2002–present
- Labels: Ladelled Music; In Phaze Records; Third Mind Records; Illuminated Records; Rhythmic Records; Dead Man's Curve; Catalyst; Sigsaly Transmissions; Other Sounds; Minimal Maximal
- Spinoffs: Solar Enemy
- Members: Dean Piavani; John Whybrew
- Past members: Ian Sharp
- Website: portioncontrol.net

Portion Control are a British electronic and industrial band from South London, formed in 1979. The original incarnation of the group existed until 1987; after a brief incarnation as Solar Enemy, they reformed in 2002.

The band pioneered the use of sampling and were acclaimed for their use of the Apple II computer based Greengate DS3 sampling and sequencing system. They have been cited as an influence on Front Line Assembly, Skinny Puppy, Orbital and Nine Inch Nails.

== History ==
Portion Control formed in 1979 with a line-up of Dean Piavani, Ian Sharp and John Whybrew. The band took the name "Portion Control" from Whybrew's time in catering school, presuming it to be not particularly pretentious or associated with a particular style.

The trio's first release, the cassette-only A Fair Portion (including Andy Wilson of the Passage on bass), was issued in 1980 by Ladelled Music, followed by three further cassettes on In Phaze Records, Gaining Momentum and Private Illusions No 1 (both 1981) and With Mixed Emotion (1982). These early cassette releases were a highly DIY affair, featuring hand-drawn art by band members, direct recording to cassette recorders, and some of the earliest affordable electronic instruments such as the ARP Axxe synthesizer and Roland CR-78 drum computer.

Their first full-length vinyl release, I Staggered Mentally, was released 22 November 1982 by In Phaze. The album marked the beginning of the band's underground recognition and was noted for its use of the distinctive Roland TB-303 many years before the sound became popularized by acid house and techno music. The subsequent three 12" releases — "Raise the Pulse", "Rough Justice", and "Go Talk" — presented the band in a more dancefloor-oriented format.

In January 1984, Portion Control recorded a Peel Session. With the release in 1984 of Step Forward, the band branched into a more melodic sound, earning them a supporting role in Depeche Mode's tour that same year.

By the late eighties, the band was introduced to music manager Tom Watkins who signed the band and arranged a deal with London Records. They began work on a new album and single and enlisted producer Arthur Baker for a remix. But, as the work began to culminate, the label "went cold," offering an objection to the "gruffness of Dean's vocals" and the relationship effectively ended, leaving the band confused over two years of wasted time.

=== Solar Enemy ===
Solar Enemy
- Origin: London, England
- Genres: Electronic
- Years active: 1990–1993
- Labels: T.E.Q. Music?; Third Mind
- Spinoff of: Portion Control
- Past members: John Whybrew; Ian Sharp; Dean Piavani

In the aftermath of the debacle with London records, the band contemplated a name change as a means of deflecting over two years of apparent inactivity. At the same time, Gary Levermore of Third Mind Records, who had previously desired to sign Portion Control to his label, took advantage of the opportunity. The band rebranded as Solar Enemy and almost immediately released a single, "Techno Divinity." Along with the rebrand, the sound of Solar Enemy was significantly different than Portion Control, with less emphasis on the vocals and "harshness" that characterized the latter. The band released two albums, one on Third Mind Records and one on T.E.Q. Music, with some songs that did some reasonable business in the clubscene at the time. Feeling that they had lost their direction, the band ceased activity after 1993.

=== Re-formation ===
Coming off of the work with T.E.Q. Music as Solar Enemy, the band planned several reissues of Portion Control material, culminating in a retrospective compilation, The Man Who Did Backward Somersaults in 1994. Otherwise, the band ceased activity for a number of years.

Piavanni and Whybrew reformed Portion Control in 2002, and self-released their first reunion album, Wellcome, in 2004. The reformed duo committed to only using software-based instruments, casting off the analog, hardware-based sound of their first incarnation. After Wellcome the band released new albums consistently every one to two years through 2012. After 2012's Pure Form, the band's output slowed, with only the release of compilation and live albums. In 2020 they released a new material on the full length, Head Buried, and the "SEED" EPs.

== Influences and style ==
While the band played alongside and associated with many early industrial bands such as SPK, Chris & Cosey, and 23 Skidoo, they consider their earliest influences as punk rock and post-punk bands like Wire and The Pop Group.

The band described their early approach to music as "electropunk", with Whybrew explaining "Our background is punk--any kind of slightly hippyish notion left us cold." In a 2015 interview, the band described themselves as "electro punk with elements of EBM and industrial." The band's early sound consisted of a mixture of analog synths including Roland and Moog keyboards, mixed with software and modular samplers including the Apple II-based Greengate DS:3 and the Akai S-series samplers. After reforming, the band went entirely digital, using software synths and midi controllers to replicate the analog feel of their earlier work.

Author S. Alexander Reed, in his book Assimilate: A Critical History of Industrial Music, said that Portion Control's early sound "blends innocuously with the moodier moments of Cabaret Voltaire and Throbbing Gristle", and at times "demonstrated a gift for gritty, teethgrinding distortion, not unlike Esplendor Geometrico". Other reviewers took note that the band's later compositions mix their signature dancefloor-oriented tracks with more experimental, soundtrack-like compositions.

== Legacy ==
Portion Control have been cited as an influence on numerous industrial and electronic music bands including Skinny Puppy, Orbital and Nine Inch Nails. In the liner notes for the retrospective compilation, The Man Who Did Backward Somersaults, Bill Leeb of Front Line Assembly wrote "they are the band that inspired me to do my own music."

== Members ==
Current

- Dean Piavani (1979–1987, 2002–present)
- John Whybrew (1979–1987, 2002–present)

Former

- Ian Sharp (1979–1987)

== Discography as Portion Control ==
=== Studio albums ===
- A Fair Portion cassette-only (1980, Ladelled Music)
- Gaining Momentum cassette-only (1981, In Phaze Records)
- Private Illusions No 1 cassette-only (1981, In Phaze Records)
- With Mixed Emotion cassette-only (1982, In Phaze Records)
- I Staggered Mentally (1982, In Phaze Records)
- Shot in the Belly cassette-only (1983, Third Mind Records)
- ..Step Forward (1984, Illuminated Records)
- Psycho-Bod Saves the World (1986, Dead Man's Curve)
- Wellcome (2004, self-released)
- Dissolve (2004, Catalyst)
- Filthy White Guy (2006, self-released)
- Onion Jack IV (2007, self-released)
- Slug (2008, self-released)
- Violently Alive (2010, Sigsaly Transmissions)
- Pure Form (2012, Other Sounds)
- Unrest in the Grime (2014, Minimal Maximal)
- Head Buried (2020, self-released)

=== Singles ===
- "Across the Fence" flexi-disc (1981, In Phaze Records)
- "Raise the Pulse" 7"/12" (1982, Illuminated Records)
- "Rough Justice" 12" (1984, Illuminated Records)
- "Go-Talk" 12" (1984, Illuminated Records))
- "The Great Divide" 7"/12" (1985, Rhythmic Records)

=== EPs ===
- Dining on the Fresh cassette-only (1981, In Phaze Records)
- Surface and Be Seen 12" (1982, In Phaze Records)
- Hit the Pulse 12" (1983, In Phaze Records)
- Purge 12" (1986, Dead Man's Curve)
- Code 11 digital (2003, self-released)
- Stansted 7"/CD (2005, self-released)
- SEED EP1 digital (2020, self-released)
- SEED EP2 digital (2021, self-released)
- SEED EP3 digital (2021, self-released)

=== Live albums ===
- Assault (1986, For All and None)
- Live in Europe (Spain⦁UK⦁Sweden) (1987, Big Noise in Archgate)
- Live Granada 1985 (2014, Wet Dreams)

=== Compilation albums ===
- Simulate Sensual (1983, In Phaze Records)
- The Man Who Did Backwards Somersaults (1994, T.E.Q. Music?)
- Archive (2006, self-released)
- Solar Enemy vs. Portion Control (2008, Bastet Recordings)
- Crop (2009, Sigsaly Transmissions)
- Progress Report 1980-1983 (2010, Vinyl-on-demand)
- Progress Report 1982-1986 (2015, Vinyl-on-demand)
- Dissolve Plus (2022, VUZ Records)

== Discography as Solar Enemy ==
=== EPs ===
- Techno Divinity (1990, Third Mind Records)

=== Albums ===
- Dirty vs Universe (1991, Third Mind Records)
- Proceed to Beyond (The Rape of Europa) (1993, T.E.Q. Music?)

=== Compilation appearances ===
- The Third Mind (1990)
- Funky Alternatives Vol. 6 (1991)
- Pieces Of Mind (1991)
- Mindfield (1992)
- Ghafran (1993)
- Body Rapture II (1993)
- Taste This Vol. 3 (1995)
