= Corde Oblique =

Italian neofolk band

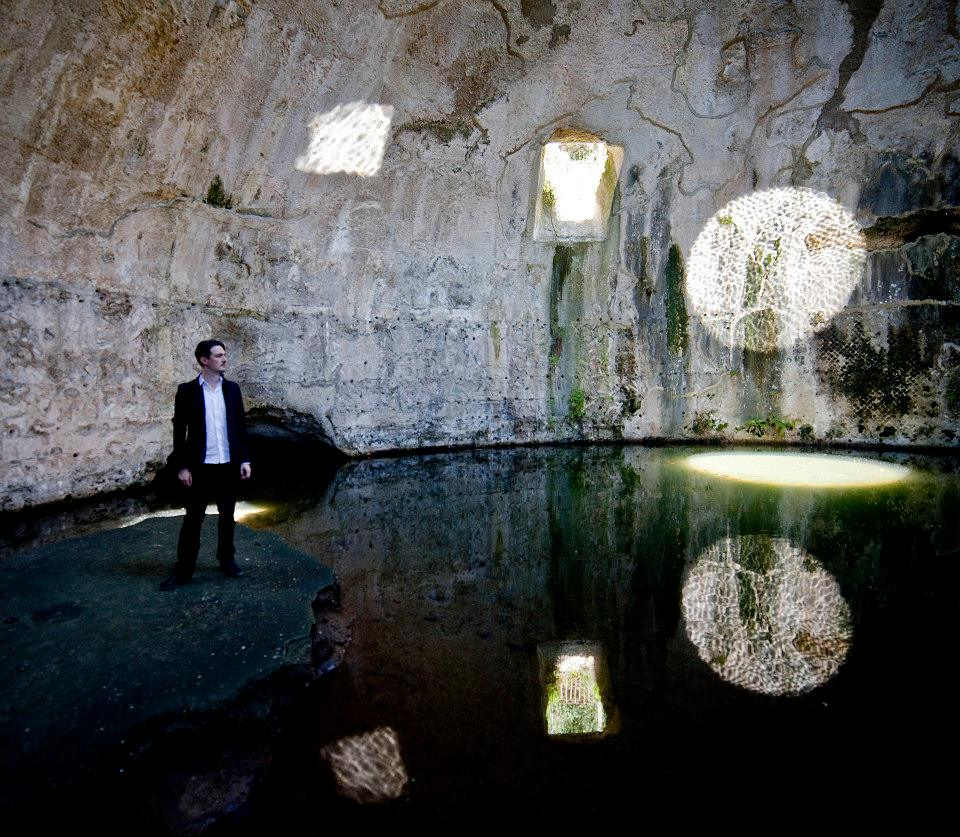

Background information
- Origin: Naples, Italy
- Genres: Ethereal Neofolk (Darkwave) Mediterranean progressive, folk music
- Years active: 2005–present
- Labels: Prikosnovenie, World Serpent, Infinite fog, ARK, Dark Vinyl, Caustic records
- Members: Riccardo Prencipe
- Website: www.cordeoblique.com

Corde Oblique are one of the main ethereal progressive neofolk bands from Italy. They are the solo project of Riccardo Prencipe (composer, art historian) with vocal contributions from numerous female singers and actresses. After night studio albums the project began to change its skin and proposed "FolkGaze" sounds, a cross between folk and shoegazer.

Corde Oblique have performed over 150 concerts in the following countries: Italy, Germany, China, Albania, Belgium, Holland, Portugal, Bulgaria, France.

Riccardo Prencipe also collaborated with many vocal guests and musicians, featuring members from the following bands: Anathema, Daemonia Nymphe, Spiritual Front, Ashram, Fulci, Irfan, Miro Sassolini, Andrea Chimenti and more

Graduated in classical guitar from the Conservatory of Naples San Pietro a Majella, since 2000 Prencipe has released eight albums, distributed in Europe and worldwide by record companies in different countries (Russia, China, Germany, France and Portugal), all excellently reviewed by critics. The original pieces proposed by the ensemble speak of the history of Italian art and of a "wild and talented" South.

== History ==
Prencipe started in 1999 with his first neomedieval gothic band, LUPERCALIA. They released the first album Soehrimnir with the English label World Serpent distribution (Death in June, Current 93, Antony and the Johnsons, Nurse with Wound) and the second album Florilegium with the Portuguese label Equilibrium Music. In 2005 Riccardo started his idea of the "Workshop of sound", an open team with many artists to collaborate with.

== Concerts ==
Corde Oblique performed over 150 shows in festivals in Italy, China, France, Germany, Belgium, Portugal, Bulgaria, Holland and Albania, sharing the stage with bands like Bauhaus, Anathema, Opeth, Coph Nia, Moonspell, Ataraxia, Persephone, Spiritual Front, QNTAL, Kirlian Camera, and Of the Wand and the moon.

Places and festivals where they performed since 2005 include Auditorium Parco della Musica (Rome), La Loco (Paris), Gotischer Saal (Berlin), Unesco Center Beja, Portugal, Casa del Jazz (Rome), Archeological Museum (Naples), Wave Gotik Treffen (edition 2009, 2011, 2017, 2024), Amphi Festival (edition 2014, 2018), NCN Festival (edition 2022, 2026), Schauspielhaus (Leipzig), Culture Centre (Shanghai), La Locomotive (Bologna), Museo Madre (Napol), Tanzbrunnen Theatre (Koeln), Auditorium del Museo di Capodimonte (Naples), Museum Centrale Montemartini (Rome), Theatre Mediterraneo per il Comicon festival (Naples), Stazione Birra (Rome), Giffoni Film Festival (Giffoni), Qube (Rome), Cultural Centre of Huy (Belgio), Casina Vanvitelliana (Bacoli), Teatro centrale di Valona (Albania), Villa Pignatelli (Naples), Oratorio di San Quirino (Parma), Villa Fondi (Piano di Sorrento), Arco di Traiano (Ancona), Università degli Studi (Florence), Casa della Musica (Naples), Giardini Estensi (Modena), and Nanshan recreation and sports theater (Shenzhen, China).

== Collaborations with artists and photographers ==
The band performed at the Comicon Festival with the painter Milo Manara, for the presentation of his book on Caravaggio.

The cover picture and all pictures of the album florilegium are photos by the German photographer Achim Bednorz.

The cover of the album Respiri is a photo by the Japanese photographer Kenro Izu.

The cover of the album I Maestri del Colore is a photo from one of the main Italian photographers, Franco Fontana.

== China tour ==
In December 2015, Corde Oblique were the first independent band to be invited for a tour of nine concerts in China.

in April 2018 the band performed in China again. They were part of the Nanshan Pop Festival 2018. Their show was at the big stage of the Nanshan recreation and sports theater, in the city of Shenzhen, near Hong Kong.

== History of art ==
The group's music has a deep connection with the history of art. As an art historian, Riccardo Prencipe (Ph.D) worked for the critic texts for the exhibition in the National Museum of Capodimonte about the painting of a lute player by Jan Vermeer, and held a few lectures about ancient musical instruments through paintings, frescoes and statues (middle age and ancient Rome). He is also an art history teacher at a high school.

== List of guests and contributions ==
In many years Prencipe wrote music and lyrics for many voices and musicians. Here a list of some musicians featured on Corde Oblique's albums:

- Caterina Pontrandolfo – vocals on all albums
- Maddalena Crippa – spoken vocals on "La Casa del Ponte"
- Miro Sassolini ex Diaframma – vocals on "Il Terzo Suono"
- Andrea Chimenti – vocals on Per la Strade Ripetute
- Duncan Patterson (Anathema) – mandolin on A Hail of Bitter Almonds
- Fiore Stravino (Fulci) - vocals on "the nightingale and the oak"
- Walter Maioli (Synaulia) – flutes on A Hail of Bitter Almonds and I Maestri del Colore
- Donatello Pisanello (Officina Zoé) – accordion on A Hail of Bitter Almonds
- Floriana Cangiano – vocals on all except Respiri and I Maestri del Colore
- Simone Salvatori (Spiritual Front) – vocals on Volontà d'arte
- Sergio Panarella (Ashram) – vocals on Volontà d'arte
- Spyros Giasafakis (Daemonia Nymphe) – vocals on A Hail of Bitter Almonds and Per la Strade Ripetute
- Luigi Rubino (Ashram) – piano on all albums
- Claudia Florio – vocals on Volontà d'arte
- Catarina Raposo – vocals on Respiri and Volontà d'Arte'
- Denitza Seraphim (Irfan) – vocals on I Maestri del Colore
- Quartetto Savinio – appearance on I Maestri del Colore
- Giuseppe Frana (Micrologus) – vocals on I Maestri del Colore
- Rita Saviano – live vocals
- Edo Notarloberti (Argine, Ashram) – violin on all albums
- Annalisa Madonna – live vocals
- Umberto Lepore – live bass
- Alessio Sica – live drums

== Discography ==
=== Studio albums ===
- Respiri (ARK Records/Masterpiece, 2005)
- Volontà d'arte (Prikosnovenie/Audioglobe, 2007)
- The Stones of Naples (Prikosnovenie/Audioglobe, 2009)
- A Hail of Bitter Almonds (Prikosnovenie/Audioglobe, 2011)
- Per la Strade Ripetute (Prikosnovenie, The Stones of Naples/Audioglobe, 2013)
- I Maestri del Colore (Infinite fog, Audioglobe, 2016)
- Back through the liquid mirror – live in the studio (Dark Vinyl, Audioglobe, 2018); Asian edition (CD/DVD Dying art productions 2018)
- The Moon is a dry bone (Dark Vinyl, Audioglobe, 2020)
- Cries and Whispers (TSON, Audioglobe, 2025)
- All'ombra dei fanciulli in fiore (Dark Vinyl, Audioglobe, 2026)

=== Vinyl ===
- Mille anni che sto qui (7", Caustic Records, 2017)
- The Moon is a dry bone (Dying Arts production, China, 2021)
- Volontà d'arte (Vrijheid records, China, 2025)

=== Digital albums ===
- Richiami a Mezzo Mare (2013)
- Itri (2015)
- I Maestri del Colore, Vol. 2 (2016)
- Leaver (EP, 2023)
- Capricho Arabe (EP, 2025)
