= Chebotarenko =

Chebotarenko is a Ukrainian surname. Notable people with the surname include:

- Sergii Chebotarenko, Ukrainian film director and producer
- Yevhen Chebotarenko, musician of the Ukrainian music band Flëur
