= Dirge (band) =

French post-metal band (1994–2019)

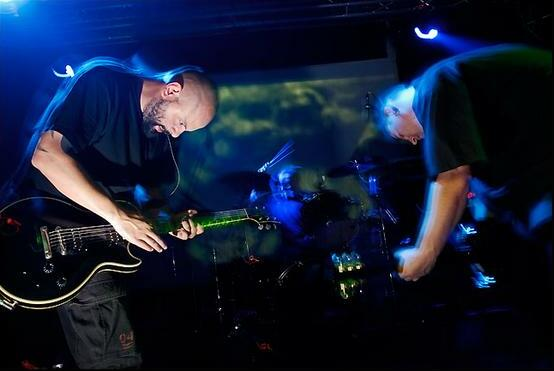
- Dirge in Paris, 2007

Background information
- Origin: Paris, France
- Genre: Post-metal
- Years active: 1994−2019
- Past members: Marc T. Alain B. Stéphane L. Luz
- Website: www.dirge.fr

Dirge was a French post-metal band formed in 1994. From the industrial metal genre that exploded in the first part of the 90s, the band slowly evolved toward a more atmospheric and progressive form of metal, comparable to post-metal bands such as Neurosis and Isis.

== History ==
Dirge was formed near Paris in 1994. The original band members were Marc T. (guitar / programming) and Laurent P. (vocals / programming). In the industrial genre of bands like Godflesh or Pitchshifter, the duet's music was a hybrid of corrosive guitars, robotic hammerings, and scratching samples. Three demo tapes were recorded during this first period.

After the departure of Laurent, bass player David K. and guitarist Franck T. joined the band. This first change in the line-up coincided with a noisier and less electronic curve: dark, tortured, and dissonant, the first album Down, Last Level was released in 1998.

In 1999, Alain B. (drums) and Christophe "Zomb" D. (machines) joined the band. Re-humanized with the use of a real drum, the music of Dirge became much more massive and stifling, as the guitars became the center of gravity with the release of the second album Blight And Vision Below A Faded Sun (released in 2000 on the own band's label, Blight Records). With this record, the band took "a further step toward a much heavier music with more progressive and dark compositions", as written by C. Lorentz in the book "Carnets Noirs, Acte II."

Replacing Franck and David, Christian M. (bass) and guitarist Stéphane L. joined Dirge in 2001. Three years later, the third record, And Shall The Sky Descend, saw the light and presented a more psychedelic aspect of the band's music. If heavy guitars stayed in the center of the four long pieces that had built ASTSD, the extremely slow-downed tempos, creeping samples, minimal parts, violin, didgeridoo and female vocals of Von Magnet's Flore Magnet presented the result of four years of musical evolution.

In November 2006, the band went back into the studio to record its fourth album, Wings Of Lead Over Dormant Seas. Released one year later as a double CD set, it featured Kill the Thrill's singer Nicolas Dick on two tracks and received a notable welcome from the press, Terrorizer's J. C. Santos summing up about WOLODS that "For once the word 'genius' is entirely appropriate".

April 2011 saw the release of the fifth record, Elysian Magnetic Fields revealing new structures and atmospheres, full of melody and melancholy, highly praised by press and listeners.

"Elysian Magnetic Fields is a remarkable album, that has to be listened to, for it causes a direct feedback" states German magazine Legacy. For www.roadburn.com : "This is a stunning release and unlikely to be bettered this year".

After several tours to promote the album (as well as some line-up changes), Dirge joins the roster of fine French avant-garde label Debemur Morti Productions (home of Blut Aus Nord, Behexen, Archgoat, Rosetta, Year of No Light).

The sixth album, Hyperion, was released in March 2014.

In March 2019, the band announced they had broken up.

== Members ==
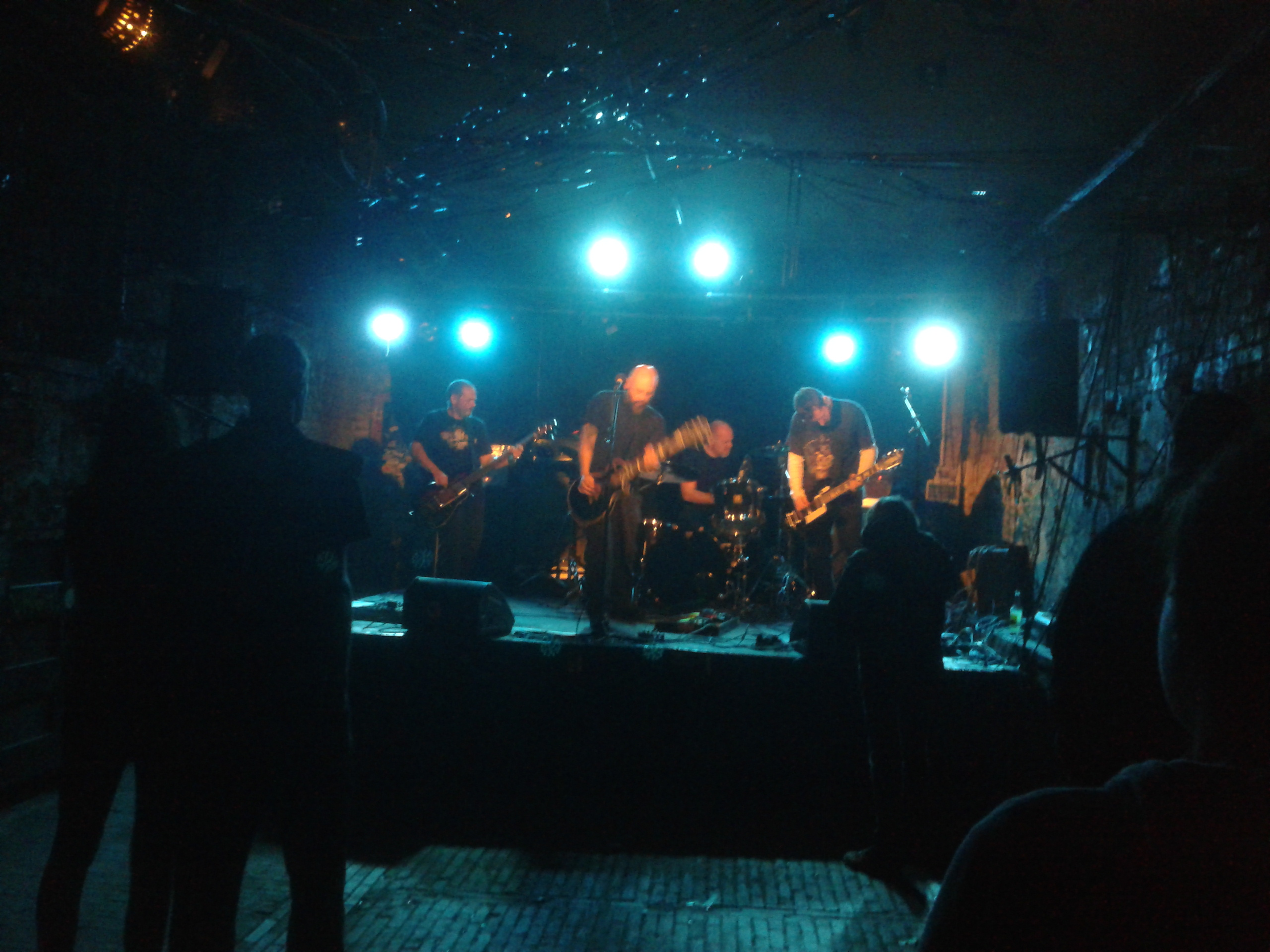
Dirge performing in Germany in 2015

=== Final lineup ===
- Marc T. – guitar, vocals, programming (1994–2019)
- Alain B. – drums (1999–2019)
- Stephane L. – guitar (2001–2019)
- Luz – bass (2011–2019)

=== Past members ===
- Hichem A. – bass
- Laurent P. – vocals, programming (1994–1996)
- David K. – bass, vocals (1998–2001)
- Franck T. – guitar, vocals (1998–2001)
- Christop "Zomb" D. – samples (1999–2014)
- Christian M. – bass (2001–2011)

== Discography ==
=== Albums ===
- Down, Last Level (1998) – (It's Time to Records) – ITT 001176–2
- Blight And Vision Below A Faded Sun (2000) – (Blight Records) – BR 01
- And Shall The Sky Descend (2004) – (Blight Records) – BR02/1 / (Equilibre Music) – EM 014 /2007, reissue
- Wings of Lead over Dormant Seas (2007) – (Equilibre Music/Blight Records) – EM 012/EML 012
- Elysian Magnetic Fields (2011) – (Blight Records/Division Records) – DR 041
- Hyperion (2014) – (Debemur Morti/Blight Records) – DMP 0104
- Lost Empyrean (2018) – (Debemur Morti/Blight Records) – DMP 0167
- Vanishing Point (2021) – (Division Records/Blight Records) – DR 083

=== Demos ===
- Infected Brain Machine (1994)
- Mind Time Control (1995)
- Dead Network Access (1996)

=== Compilation appearances ===
- Hard Core Is A State Of Mind, (1996)
- Lágrimas De Miedo Nº3, (1996)
- Rock Sound 99, (2005)
- Elegy Sampler 49, (2007)
- Hard Rock Sampler 07, (2007)
- Lágrimas De Miedo N°14 – Pornography: Re-heat (2008)
- Falling Down Compilation (2008) -
