= Psychostasia (album) =

Studio album by Daemonia Nymphe
- Released: 10 May 2013
- Recorded: 2008 – 2013
- Studio: Slaughterback Studio, London, England; The Sonic Ark, Thessaloniki, Greece; Studio 5, Athens, Greece
- Length: 40:12
- Label: Prikosnovénie

Psychostasia is the third studio album by the Greek musical group Daemonia Nymphe, released on 10 May 2013 by the record label Prikosnovénie.

== Background and recording ==
The album is themed around the weighing of souls, a concept known from ancient Greek sources as psychostasia. It was recorded from 2008 to 2013 at Slaughterback Studio in London, the Sonic Ark studio in Thessaloniki and Studio 5 in Athens. The three additional tracks for the 2018 re-release were recorded in 2018 at Studio 5 in Athens and Slaughterback studio in London.

== Release and performances ==
Psychostasia was released 10 May 2013 by the French record label Prikosnovénie. It formed the basis for the music-theatre show Psychostasia: The Performance, created by Daemonia Nymphe in collaboration with the Theatre Lab Company in London. On 22 November 2018, the album was re-released on digital platforms with three additional tracks.

== Reception ==
Mákis Milátos of Athens Voice called the album "very interesting, personal" and wrote that it reminded him of "the form, aesthetics and atmosphere of Dead Can Dance". He called it "a credible album where the duo clearly are found to have improved on all points compared to their previous record". Giórgos S. Koulouváris of Clickatlife referenced Yann Tiersen, Peter Gabriel and Dead Can Dance when he described individual tracks. He described the overall sound as a "natural continuation" for the duo with the theme of Greek mythology intact. Koulouváris wrote that there has been a "steady upward trend" for the band over the 15 years since its first release, although it has remained more successful abroad than in Greece. Filip Van Muylem of Peek-A-Boo Magazine also mentioned Dead Can Dance, a reference point he especially found in the tracks "Nemesis Rhamnesia", "Thracian Gaia" and "Nature Metamorphosis". He called the album "top quality" and "a great piece of art". Reviewing the expanded edition in 2019, Tom Plovie of Peek-A-Boo Magazine wrote that "the new songs fit nicely with the first release".

== Track listing ==
No.	Title	Lyrics	Length
1.	"Zephyros's Enlightening Anemos"	Orphic Hymn to Zephyros	3:38
2.	"Nemesis Rhamnousia"	Orphic hymns to Hygeia and Nemesis	3:11
3.	"Thracian Gaia"	Orphic hymn to Gaia	4:29
4.	"Selene's Awakening Horos"		3:24
5.	"Politeia of the Unnamed"		3:17
6.	"Deo's Erotas"		4:26
7.	"Nature's Metamorphosis"		5:14
8.	"Enchanting Oneiro"		2:27
9.	"Psychostasia"	Spyros Giasafakis	6:50
10.	"Hypnos"	Orphic hymn to Hypnos	3:16
Total length:			40:12

Extra tracks (2018 digital re-release)
No.	Title	Lyrics	Length
11.	"Psyches' Choros"		03:32
12.	"The Journey of the Psyche"		03:51
13.	"Asterofeggis Nyx"	Orphic hymn to Nyx	03:54
Total length:			51:29

== Personnel ==
Daemonia Nymphe

- Spyros Giasafakis - vocals, 'ancient' Greek lyra, kitharis ('ancient' kithara), 'ancient' Greek pandoura, classical guitar, bass guitar, acoustic guitar, seistro, keras, askaulos (bag-pipes), recorder, cymbals
- Evi Stergiou - vocals, classical guitar, 'ancient' Greek pandoura, 'ancient' Greek lyra, percussion, seistro

Guest musicians

- Dimitra Galani - vocals on track 6
- Dessislava Stefanova - vocals on tracks 2, 3 and 6
- Victoria Couper - vocals on tracks 1, 2, 4, 5, 6, 7, 8, 11, 12 and 13
- Rey Yusuf - vocals on tracks 12 and 13
- Kalina Koleva - vocals on tracks 2, 3, 4 and 6
- Vaggelis Paschalides - santouri (hammered dulcimer) on tracks 2, 4, 5, 9 and darbuka on 2 and 3
- Peter Ulrich - darbuka and maracas on track 9
- Peter Jaques - clarinet on track 9
- Luka Aubri - slideridoo on track 7
- Chris Brice - drums on tracks 2 and 4
- Christiano Castellitto - djembe on track 7
- Dimitris Kotsikas - bass clarinet on track 9
- Chorus vocals on "Psychostasia": Eleni Sfertsiori, Nikos Katsaros, Euforia Leventi, Christodoulos Papastathis, Georgia Kiskou, Nota Kaltsani and Aphrodite Toplaki (Taiteria)
- Maria Stergiou - viola on tracks 3, 4 and 5
- Orestis Giasafakis - vocals on track 4
- Bernard Burns - didgeridoo ending phrase on track 7
