= Exposition, Eaux-Fortes et Méandres =

Studio album by Collection d'Arnell Andréa
- Released: 2007
- Recorded: 2006 at Studio Nyima
- Genre: Darkwave, Coldwave
- Length: 58:25
- Label: Prikosnovénie
- Producer: p.e., Collection d'Arnell Andréa

Collection d'Arnell Andréa chronology
| The Bower of Despair (2004) | Exposition, Eaux-Fortes et Méandres (2007) | Vernes-Monde (2010) |

Exposition, Eaux-Fortes et Méandres is the 8th album released by the French darkwave band Collection d'Arnell Andréa. The concept for the album is based on pianist Modest Mussorgsky's 1874 Pictures at an Exhibition piano suite, which in Mussorgsky created 10 different piano songs based on Russian artist Viktor Hartmann. The majority of the tracks on Exposition, Eaux-Fortes et Méandres are based on 19th-century paintings. These paintings had darker themes and included works from Arnold Böcklin's Isle of the Dead, Edward Robert Hughes, and John Everett Millais's Ophelia. The album cover art and title track, Les Méandres, are based on Richard Boutin's 1999 painting Crepuscule sur la Loire. Boutin also photographed the band for the album's liner notes.

== Style ==
The songs feature vocals, guitar, keyboards, cello, and viola, but also synthesizers and electronic beats. The style has been compared to the Cocteau Twins and Dark Sanctuary.

== Track listing ==
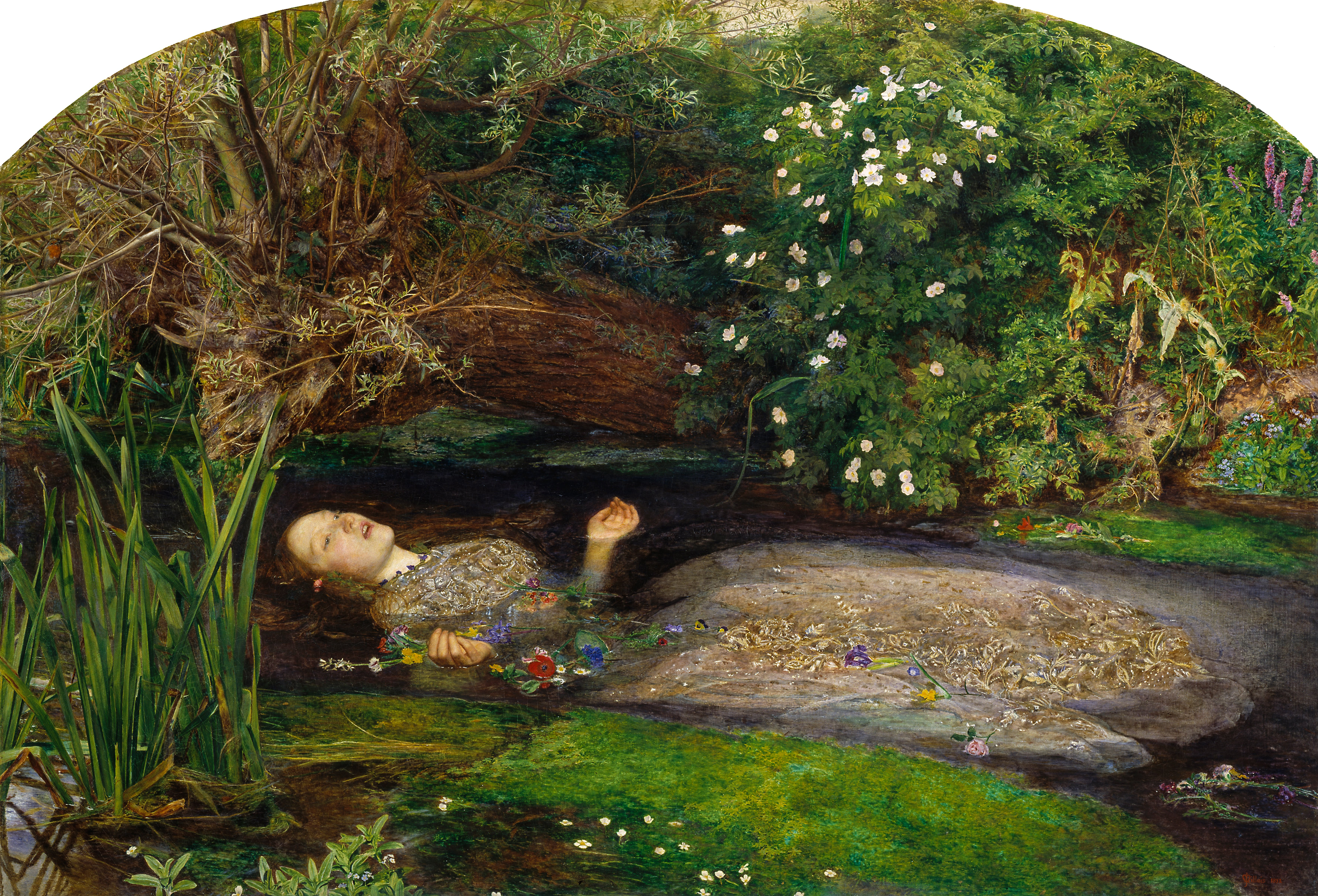
The track l'eau des Mauves was inspired by Millais's painting Ophelia.

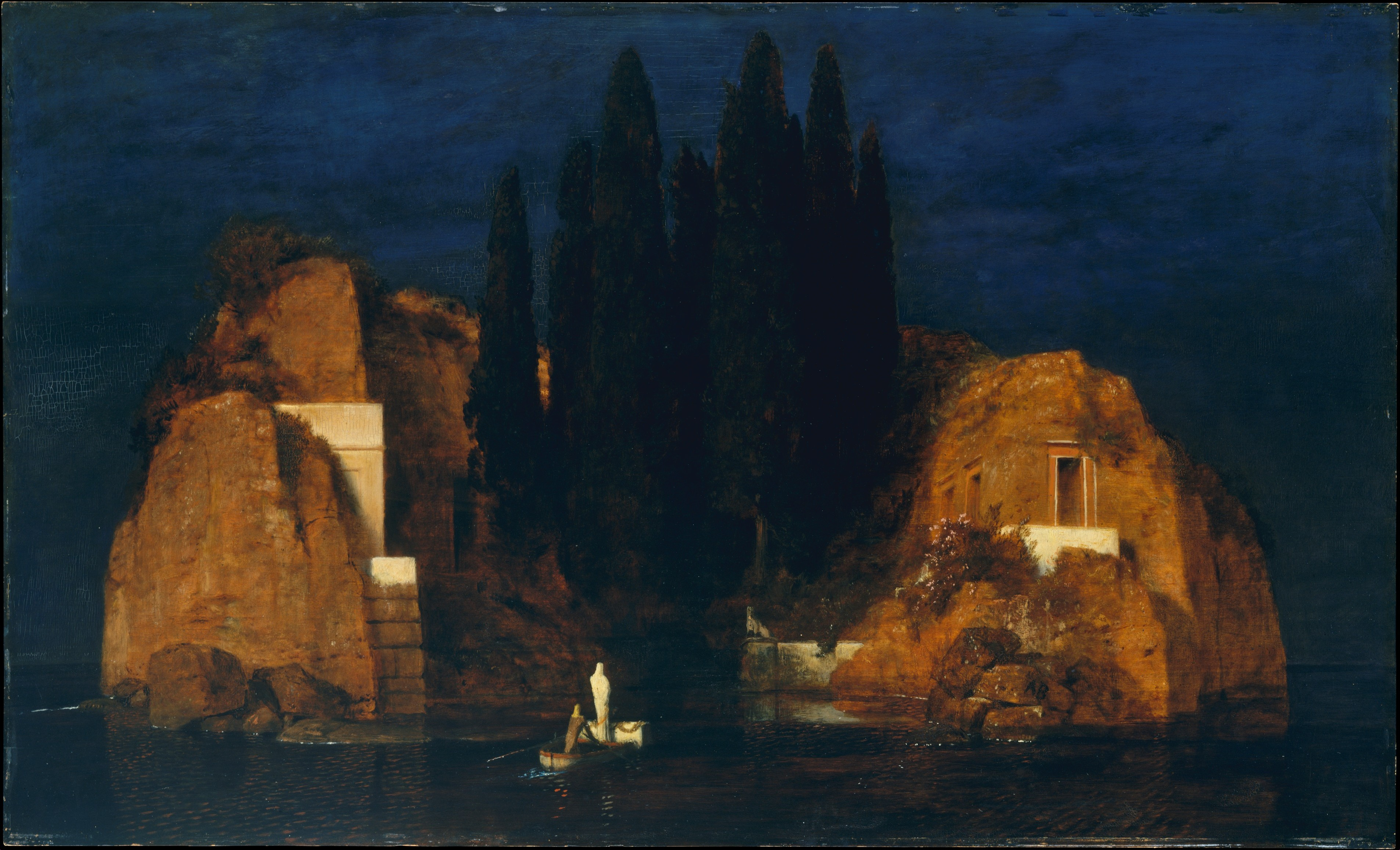
The track The Island of the Dead was inspired by Böcklin's painting Isle of the Dead.

1. "Les Sombres Plis de l'âme" – 4:40
2. "The Monk on the Shore" – 6:18
3. "Les Herbes mortes" – 6:16
4. "Les Méandres" – 6:09
5. "The Long Shadow" – 4:53
6. "I Can't See Your Face" – 6:07
7. "Les Catacombes" – 4:00
8. "Into Flowers" – 5:33
9. "Crowns of Golden Corn" – 4:03
10. "L'Eau des mauves" – 5:14
11. "The Island of the Dead" – 5:07

== Credits ==
=== Musicians ===
- Chloé St Liphard : Voices
- Carine Grieg : Keyboards
- Thibault d'Aboville : Viola, Voices
- Jean-Chrisophe d'Arnell : Keyboards, drums, Voices
- Xavier Gaschignard : Cello
- Vincent Magnien : Guitars
- Franz Torres-Quevedo : Bass guitar, Voices

=== Graphic artists ===
- Christophe Poly : liner notes
- Vincent Lacape : liner notes, band photo
- Richard Boutin : cover art, band photo

=== Production ===
- Pierre-Emmanuel Meriaud (Studio Nyima) : engineering, mixing and programming
- Terence (Studio Nyima) : mastering
