= Orange Blossom =

French electronic band

- Orange Blossom members in 2016

Background information
- Origin: Nantes, France
- Genres: Electronic, world, trip hop
- Years active: mid-1990s–present
- Members: Carlos Robles Arenas (France); Pierre-Jean Chabot (France); Hend El Rawy (Egypt)
- Past members: Éric, Jay C., Leïla Bounous

Orange Blossom is a French band that plays a mix of electronic and world music.

The band was formed in Nantes in 1993 with Pierre-Jean Chabot (known as PJ Chabot) on violin and Jean-Christophe Waechter (known as Jay C.) on percussions and vocals. The band is named after a 1920s train immortalised by Ervin Rouse and Chubby Wise's fiddle tune "Orange Blossom Special". In 1994, Éric (organ) joined the band and a first audio tape was recorded in September. In 1995 the band stabilized with the arrival of Carlos Robles Arenas on drums, djembé, and sample, and the departure of Éric. Their first disc, Orange Blossom, came out in 1997 on the Prikosnovénie label, selling 15,000 copies.

Before their second album came out, the group was influenced by ethnic and traditional music. They met and collaborated with several non-French artists, like Ivorian percussion group Yelemba D'Abidjan and Egyptian group Ganoub. They toured in Egypt, France, and Belgium. Vocalist Jay C. left the band in 2000 and created Prajña. In 2002, percussionist Mathias Vaguenez and vocalist Leïla Bounous joined the group. The album Everything Must Change came out in 2005 on the Bonsaï Music label.

Carlos Robles Arenas is Mexican. Leïla Bounous is part Algerian, part Moorish, part Breton. She later left and Hend El Rawy from Egypt, joined the band in 2014.

Their third album, Under the Shade of Violets came out in 2014. Most of the band's songs are sung in Arabic.

== Discography ==
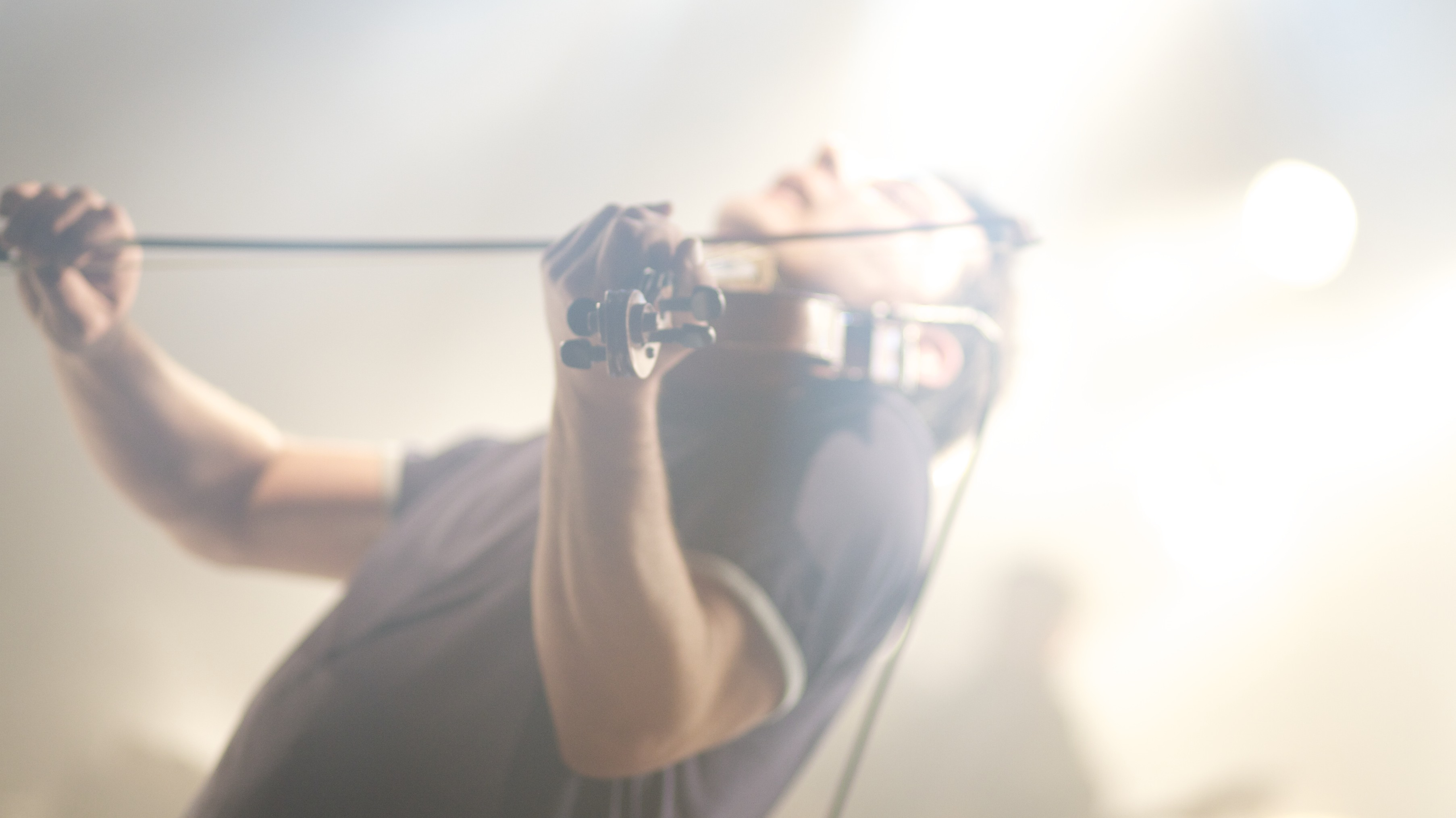
Orange Blossom in concert

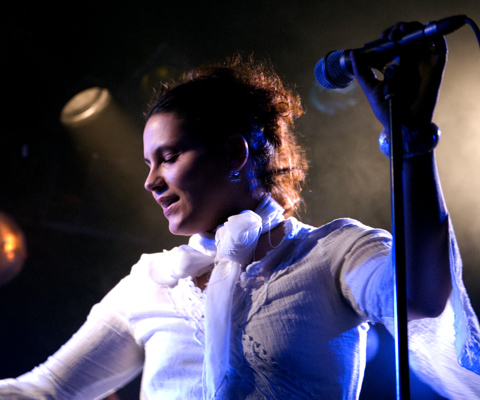
Leïla Bounous

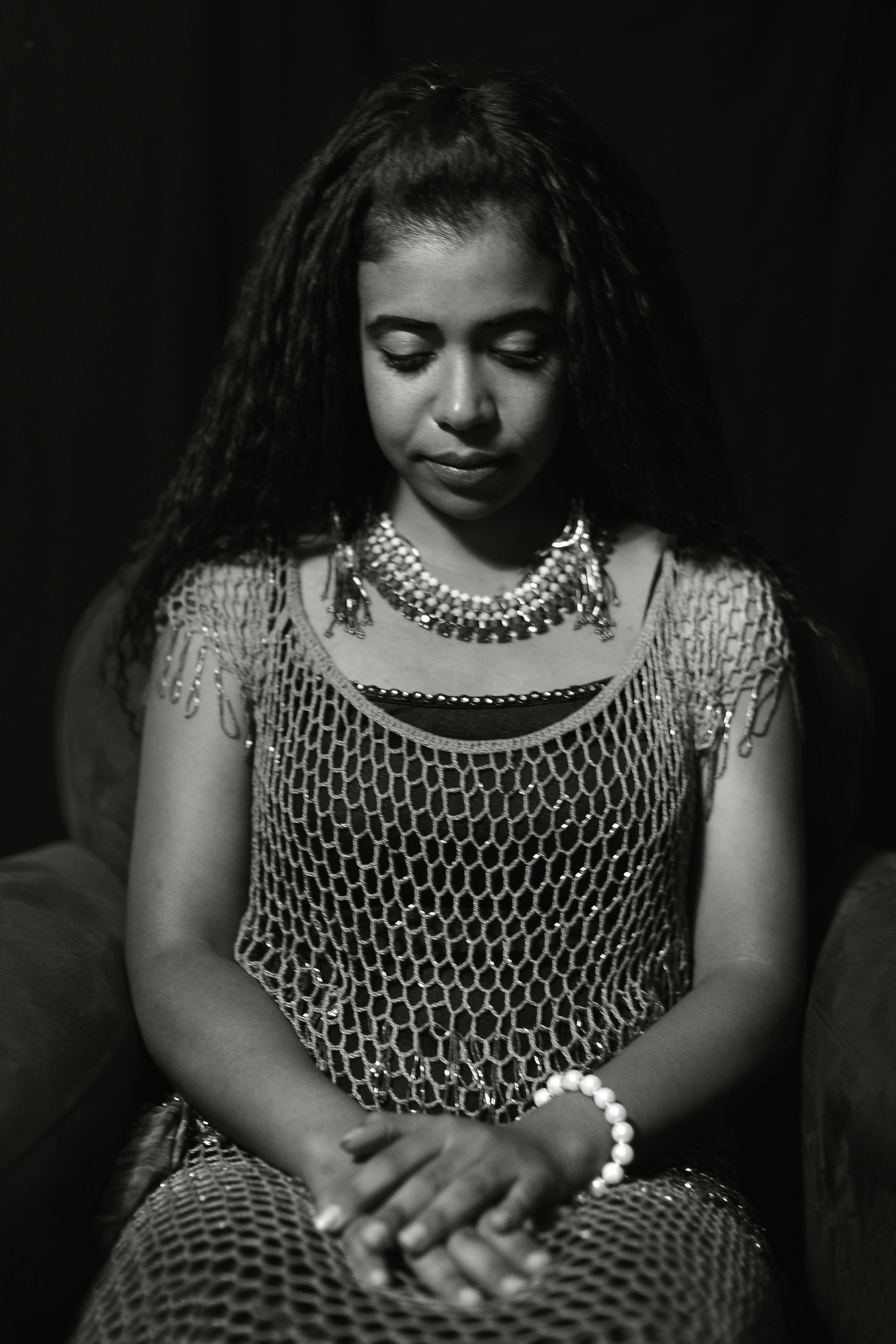
Hend El Rawy

- Self-produced 6 title audio tape (1994)
  1. Prayer
  2. Child & Doll
  3. Speedman
  4. Welcome In My Brain
  5. Jesse's Grandfather
  6. Red Orange Blossom
- Self-produced 4 title audio tape (1996)
  1. Ray
  2. Die Stadt
  3. Bali
  4. My Village
- Orange Blossom (1997)
  1. Anaconda Girl
  2. Maria Del Sol
  3. Bata
  4. N.
  5. Die Stadt
  6. I'm Dying
  7. Trinity
- Everything Must Change (2005) (SNEP FRANCE: Peak #141)
  1. Maldito (Cursed)
  2. Habibi (My Darling)
  3. Cheft El Khof (I've Seen Fear)
  4. Desert Dub
  5. Nafsi (My Soul)
  6. Souffrance
  7. Blama
  8. Yazaman (A Long Time Ago)
  9. Denya (Life)
  10. Bendimina (My Heart Is Aching)
  11. Ayoub (hidden track)
- Under the Shade of Violets (2014) (SNEP FRANCE: Peak #84)
  1. Ommaty
  2. Lost
  3. Ya Sîdî
  4. Pitcha
  5. Jerusalem
  6. Maria
  7. Goodbye Kô
  8. Mexico
  9. The Nubian
  10. Black Box
  11. Pink Ma
  12. Aqua
- SPELLS FROM THE DRUNKEN SIRENS (2024)
  1. Dounia
  2. Khalik
  3. Alsira
  4. The Gateway
  5. The Desert
  6. Mawj
  7. Bad Company
  8. Meu Amor Se Foi
  9. Awa
  10. Cariño
  11. Nouh al Hamam
  12. Wardah
  13. Ode
