= Collection d'Arnell-Andréa =

French neoclassical darkwave band

Collection d'Arnell~Andréa
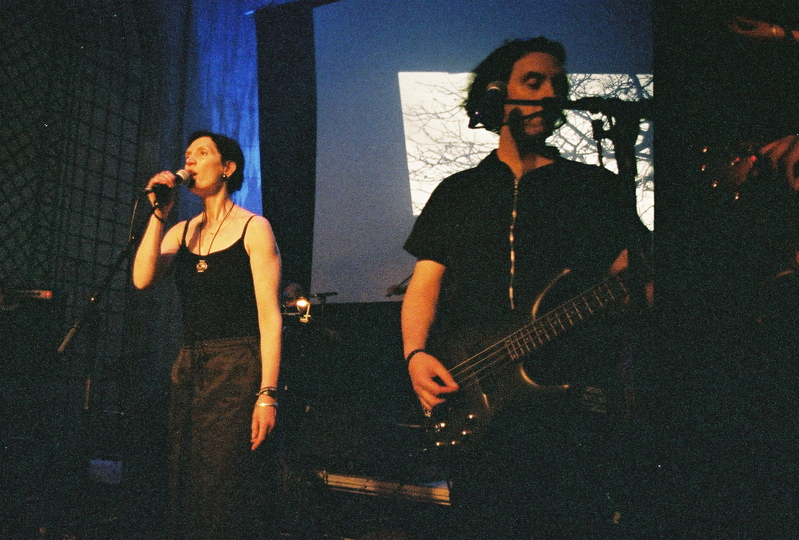
- Collection d'Arnell~Andréa performing in 2009 at the Dark Omen II festival

Background information
- Origin: France
- Genres: Coldwave, neoclassical darkwave
- Years active: 1986–present
- Labels: New Rose Records, Last Call, Prikosnovénie
- Members: Jean-Christophe d'Arnell; Xavier Gaschignard; Franz Torrès-Quévédo; Carine Grieg; Thibault d'Aboville; Vincent Magnien
- Past members: Pascal Andréa; Chloé St Liphard

Collection d'Arnell~Andréa is a French neoclassical darkwave band founded by Jean-Christophe d'Arnell (main composer, writer, piano/keyboards), Pascal Andréa, and Chloé St Liphard in 1986. Andréa left the band shortly after its founding, before its first performance. However, d'Arnell left Andréa's name in the band name. Their music prominently features keyboards, cello, and vocals by Chloé St Liphard . The band is known for featuring a large ensemble of musicians in its live performances, and has performed at many international music festivals, including Germany's Wave-Gotik-Treffen. Many of their albums have focused on late 19th and early 20th century themes.

When the band signed with Prikosnovénie in 2002, the label re-edited and re-released many New Rose Records albums that had previously been out of print. Signing with Prikosnovénie also resulted in three new albums and a new tour schedule through Europe.

== Discography ==
=== Full length albums and EPs ===
- Autumn's Breath for Anton's Death (1988)
- Un Automne à Loroy (New Rose Records, 1989; reissued by Prikosnovénie, 2004)
- Au Val des Roses (New Rose Records, 1990; reissued by Prikosnovénie, 2005)
- Les Marronniers (New Rose Records, 1992)
- Villers-aux-Vents (Février 1916) (New Rose Records, 1994; reissued by Prikosnovénie, 2003)
- Cirses des Champs (Last Call Records, 1996)
- Coll AGE 1988–1998 (Last Call Records 2 CD compilation, 1998)
- Tristesse des Mânes Prikosnovénie (2002)
- The Bower of Despair Prikosnovénie (2004)
- Exposition, Eaux-Fortes et Méandres Prikosnovénie (2007)
- Vernes-Monde Prikosnovénie (2010)

=== Compilation appearances ===
- Anton's Mind Getting Blind on 13 Lively Art (1990)
- Icare (1990)
- Une Attente Douleur on Premonition Lively Art (1992)
- L'Aulne + la Mort on Heavenly Voices Part 2 Hyperium (1993)
- Drifting on Kälte Container Radio Luxor, Sub Terranean (2001)
- Wild Trees on Fairy World II Prikosnovénie (2005)
- The Long Shadow on Fairy World III Prikosnovénie (2007)
- Closer to Unicorn on Fairy World IV Prikosnovénie (2008)

== List of band members ==
=== Studio and live ===
- Pascal Andréa (1986) – co-founder
- Jean-Christophe d'Arnell (1986–present) – co-founder, piano, keyboards, percussion
- Chloé St Liphard (1986–2026; died 2026) – co-founder, vocals
- Charlotte (1989) – cello
- Thierry Simonnet (1989) – keyboards
- Peter Rakoto (1989–1990) – bass guitar
- Xavier Gaschignard (1990–present) – cello
- Franz Torrès-Quévédo (1992–present) – guitar and bass guitar, also has been a member of O Quam Tristis, Opera Multi Steel, The Three Cold Men, and Thy Violent Vanities
- Stephan Kehlsen (1996) – bass guitar
- Carine Grieg (present) – keyboards, backing vocals, also a member of Opera Multi Steel, Gantök, and O Quam Tristis
- Thibault d'Aboville (2002–present) – viola, also a member of Gantök and Lili Kunst
- Vincent Magnien (2004–present) – electric guitar
