= Caprice (band) =

Russian neoclassical folk band

Caprice is a Moscow-based Russian neoclassical ensemble distinguished by its acoustic sound (featuring harp, violin, flute, and more) combined with electronic elements and ethereal female vocals. All of the music is composed by Anton Brejestovski. Caprice's musicians also perform in various Russian orchestras, including the Bolshoi Theatre Orchestra, the State Symphony Capella of Russia, and Yuri Bashmet's New Russia Symphony Orchestra. The group gained recognition through its Elven trilogy Elvenmusic, which also gave a name to their musical style.

Caprice was formed in 1996. That same year, the debut album Zerkalo ("Mirror") was recorded. Between 1998 and 2005, the group developed the musical style known as “music of the elves,” recording the Elven trilogy: Elvenmusic (2001), The Evening of Iluvatar’s Children (2003), and Tales of the Uninvited (2005), and later Girdenwodan Part I (2012) and Girdenwodan Part II (2014).

A significant part of the group’s work includes compositions based on the poetry of British writers such as William Blake, Robert Burns, Percy Shelley, Alfred Tennyson, Oscar Wilde, and others. This theme is reflected in three albums: Songs of Innocence and Experience (2002), Sister Simplicity (2004), and Kywitt! Kywitt! (2008).

In 2009, the group released the meditative album Six Secret Words.

In 2012 and 2014, the Girdenwodan duology was released — a stylistic continuation of Elvenmusic.

In 2024, after a ten-year silence, the group released an album based on the poetry of Federico García Lorca titled Amargo. It was Caprice’s first self-released album; all previous releases had been published by the label Prikosnovenie.

In October 2026, Caprice released The Keyhole EP 1, a four-track EP of songs from the group's upcoming album The Keyhole.

== Studio albums ==
- Mirror 1996
- Elvenmusic 2001
- Songs of Innocence and Experience 2002
- The Evening of Iluvatar’s Children (Elvenmusic 2) 2003
- Sister Simplicity 2004
- Northern Lights EP 2004
- The Seasons of Lapland 2004 (unreleased)
- Tales of the Uninvited (Elvenmusic 3) 2005
- Kywitt! Kywitt! 2007, Prikosnovenie; reissued 2008 Shadowplay
- Viola Floralis suite on La Nuit des Fees 2 2008
- Six Secret Words 2009
- Masquerade 2010
- Girdenwodan Part I 2012
- Girdenwodan Part II 2014
- Silence EP 2017 (unreleased)
- Amargo 2024
- The Keyhole EP1 2026

== Compilations and re-releases ==
- Mirror (Зеркало) revised version 2006 including "Waltz" to the words of J.R.R. Tolkien
- Kywitt! Kywitt! 2008 Shadowplay
- Gnomes Against Elves – Dvar vs Caprice 2008 (a split album with Dvar)
- Think Caprice collection 2010

== Unreleased Works ==
- "Angel with a Trumpet" (dir. Shusei Nishi, Japan, 1999), feature film
- "Prayer" (dir. Kwon Ji Young, Korea, 2000), feature film
- "The Architect" – a mini-opera based on Daniil Kharms (2000), performed in concert
- Quartet "Four Poems by Daniil Andreev" (2000), performed in concert
- Cello Sonata (2002), performed in concert
- "Grimm Brothers' Tales" (dir. Ivan Orlov, 2003), radio drama
- "The Seasons" (2004), ballet (exclusive rights held by Santa Park Ltd., Finland)
- "The Faerie Queen" (2006), ballet
- "Destination Arundo" (2006), for oboe, cello and electronics, in collaboration with Denis Osver

== Band members ==
- Inna Brejestovskaya – vocals (1996-present)
- Anton Brejestovski – music, keyboards (1996-present)
- Alexandra Korzina – violin (1996-present)
- Alexey Tolstov – cello (1998-present)
- Vladimir Bobovnikov – flute (1999-died 2026)
- Tatiana Strunina – Celtic harp, orchestral harp (2000-present)
- Alexey Bazhalkin – bassoon (2000-present)
- Anton Konchakov – clarinet (2003-present)
- Denis Osver – oboe (2005-present)
- Maxim Brejestovski – bass guitars (2010-present)
- Maria Krushevskaya – orchestral harp (2012-present)
- Maya Zhuryutina – percussion (2018-present)
- Maxim Yakovlev – acoustic guitars (2012, 2024)
- Valentino Lupo – acoustic and electric guitars (2024)
- Ilya Yagoda – drums (2015-2024)
- Dmitry Vlasenko – drums (2010, 2024)
- Nikolay Lgovsky – percussion (2005-2017)
- Anatoly Tekuchev – vibraphone (2009-2017)
- Nikolay Gorshkov – double bass (2009-2014)
- Mikhail Venikov – electric and acoustic guitars (2006-2007)
- Konstantin Shmyrev – cello (2007)
- Alexandr Mozdykov – oboe (2001-2004)
- Rostislav Sazonov – clarinet (2001-2004)
- Maria Voronina – keyboards (1998-2002)
- Sergey Bogatyrenko – clarinet (2002)
- Denis Golubev – oboe (2001)
- Valery Vasiliev – clarinet (1996-2002)
- Vlad Kommisarchuk – oboe (1996-1999)
- Anton Kobozev – flute (1996-1999, died 2002)
- Alexander Kolomiets (1996-1999, 2004)
- Yevgeny Kochat (1996, died 2002)
