= Sergii Chebotarenko =

Ukrainian filmmaker

- Born: 26 May 1984 (age 41); Kyiv, Ukraine
- Occupations: Director; producer; filmmaker
- Spouse: Anna Chebotarenko
- Children: 2
- Website: Official website; IMDB

Sergii Chebotarenko (Ukrainian: Сергій Юрійович Чеботаренко, romanized: Serhii Yuriyovych Chebotarenko, born May 26, 1984, Kyiv) is a Ukrainian film director and producer, a member of the Ukrainian Film Academy. He made his debut with the feature film Pulse (2021) which won the awards at the international festivals in America and Europe.

== Work ==
He started his career as an advertising director in 2009. For 10 years he shot commercials for big brands such as Lenovo, Honda, Subaru, Volkswagen, and Socar.

Since 2016, he has been shooting music videos for such artists as Masha Sobko, Alyona-Alyona, Vremya i Steklo, Kalush and others.

2021 debuted with the feature film Pulse. The work process on the film took more than 3 years. Pulse is based on the biography of a young athlete who was involved in a car accident and almost completely lost her sight. But she finds strength in herself and returns to the big sport.

In January 2021, the Flathead Lake International Film Festival hosted the international premiere of the film in America.

In 2021 he became a member of the Ukrainian Film Academy.

In 2021 he began work on a new feature film about Igor Sikorsky.

== Awards ==
- At the Flathead Lake International Film Festival he received awards for the Best Film and the Best Director.
- In France, the film was awarded the Jury Award at the Nice International Film Festival
- At the American Film Festival Richmond International Film Festival (RIFF) - victory in two nominations for Best Film and Best Actress (Natalia Babenko). And Jury Award "The Best of Festival".

== Family ==
Married to Anna Chebotarenko. Two children - a daughter Emily and a son Mark.
