= Irfan (band) =

Bulgarian world music band

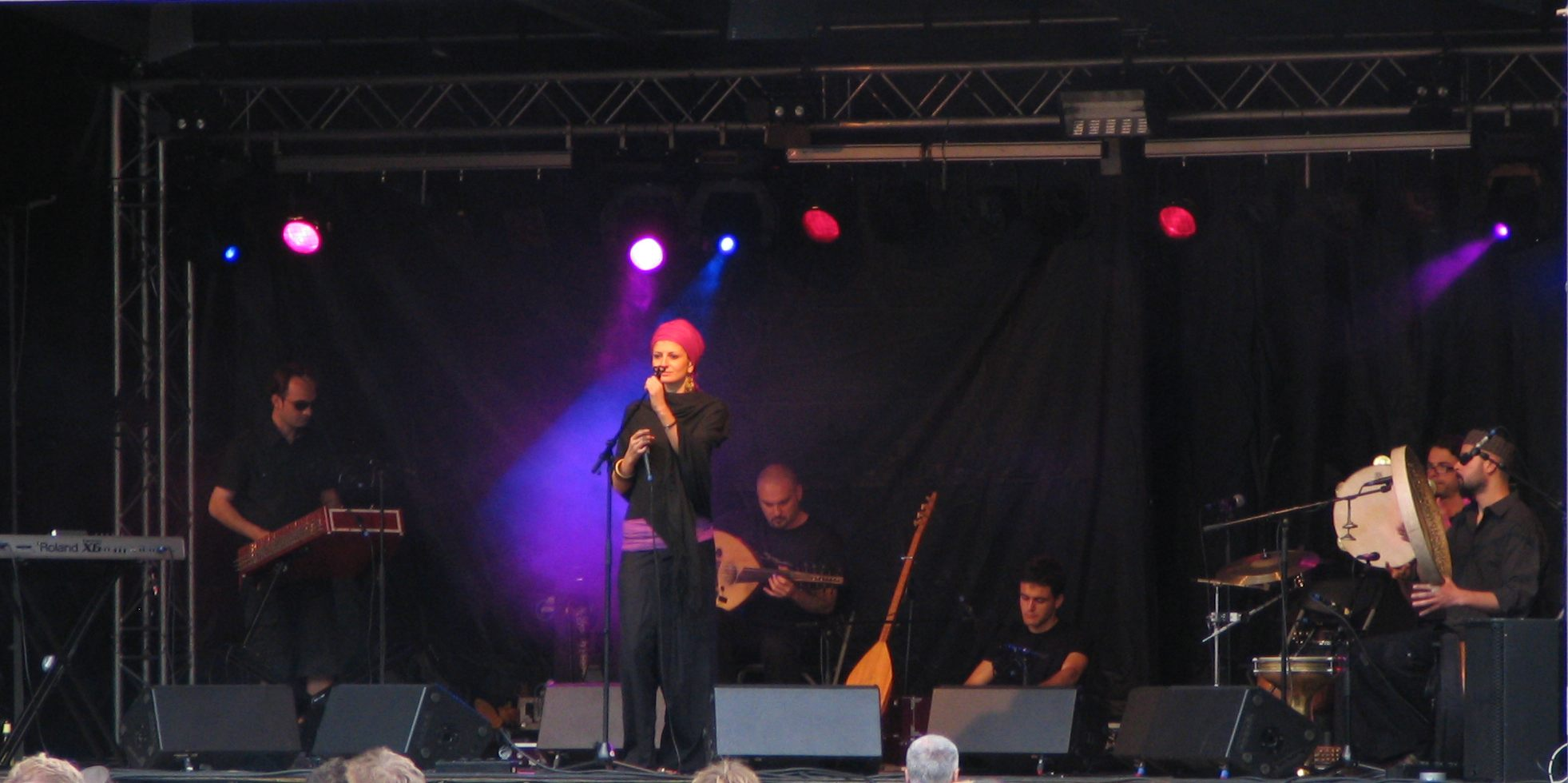
- Irfan performing live at Castlefest, Lisse, August 2, 2008

Background information
- Origin: Bulgaria
- Genres: Folk rock, Ethereal wave
- Years active: 2001–present
- Label: Prikosnovénie
- Members: Ivailo Petrov; Kalin Yordanov; Peter Todorov; Yasen Lazarov; Darina Zlatkova
- Past members: Denitsa Serafimova
- Website: www.facebook.com/irfantheband

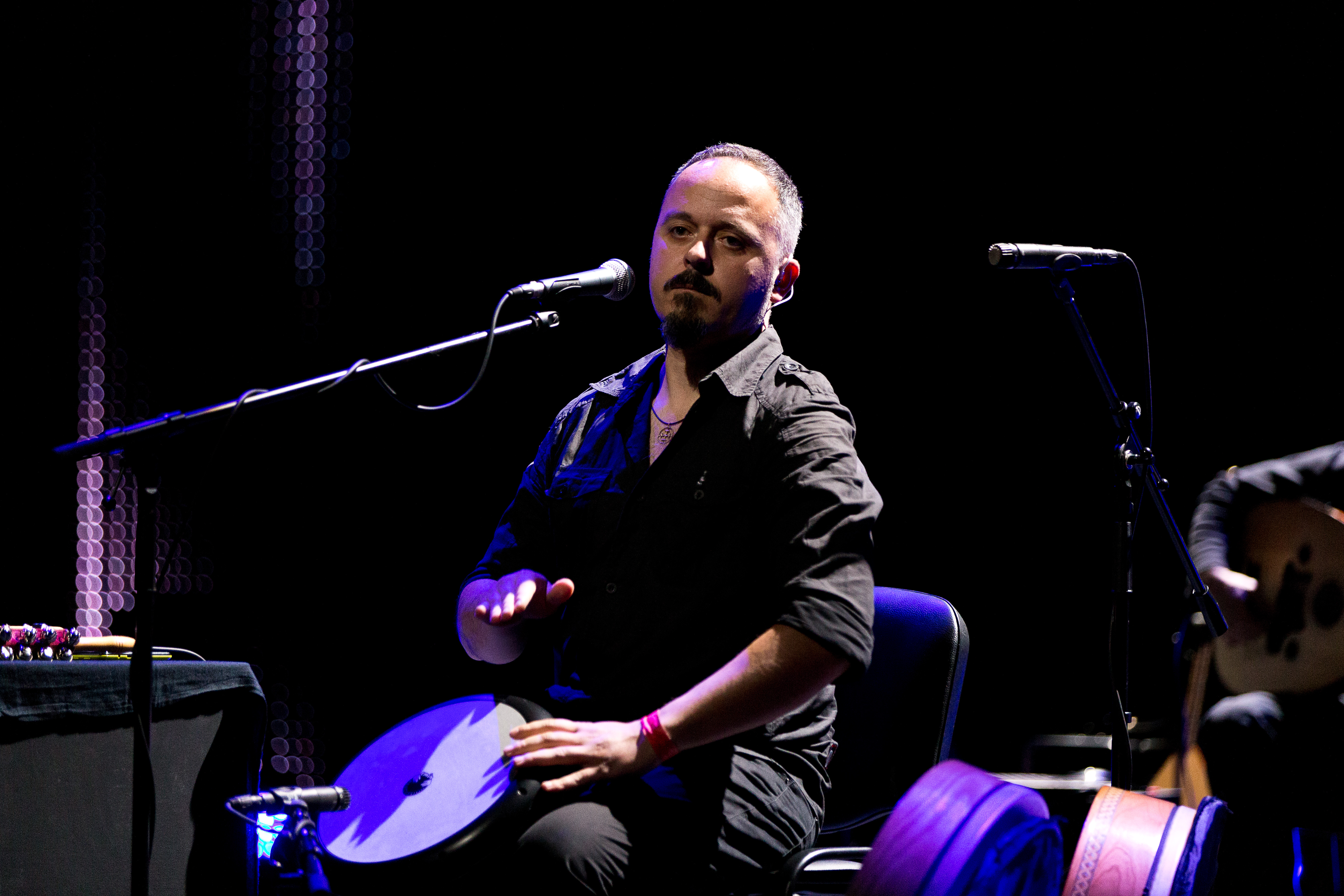
Kalin Yordanov at the 25. Wave-Gotik-Treffen in Leipzig 2016.

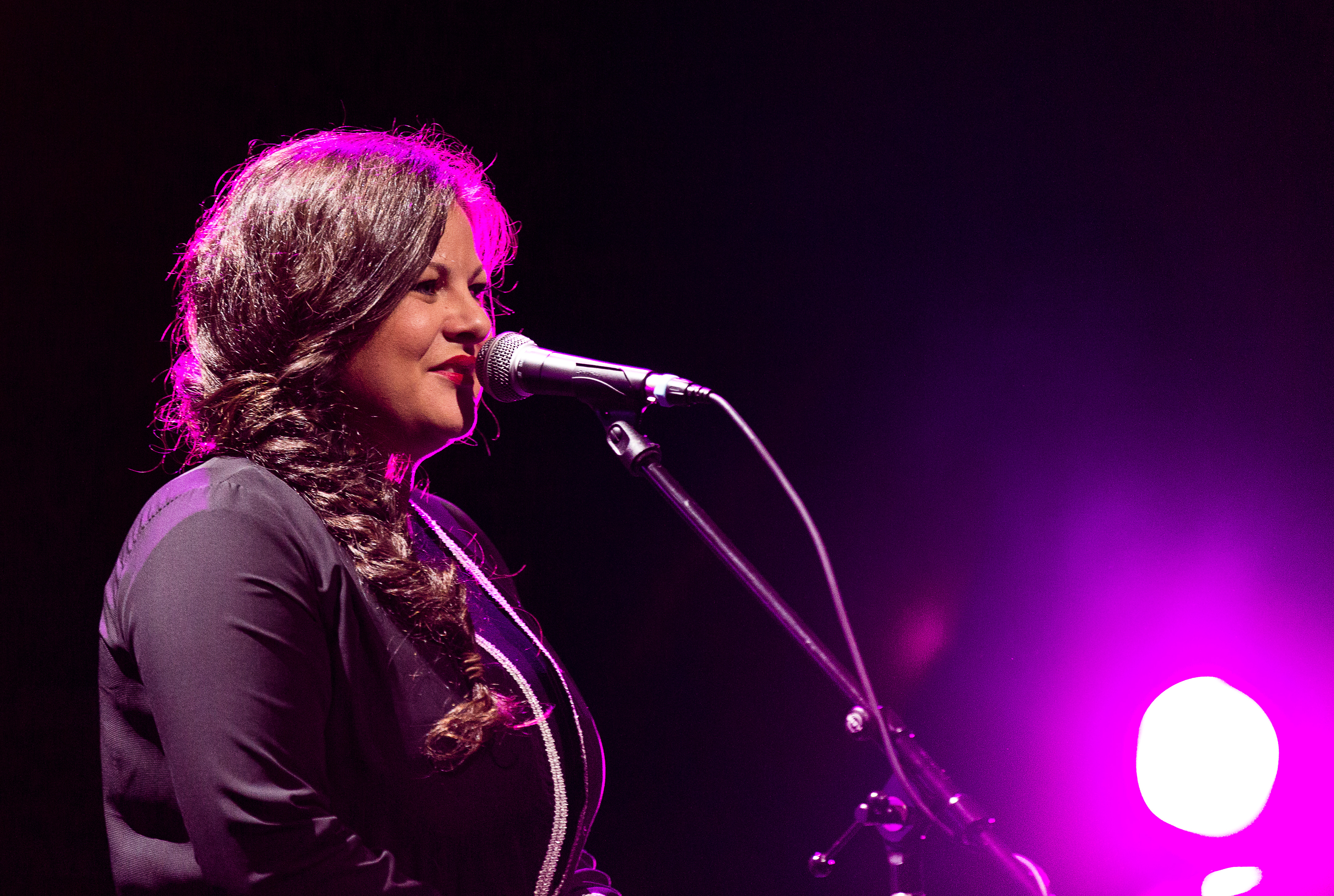
Darina Zlatkova at the 25. Wave-Gotik-Treffen.

Irfan is an ethereal folk rock band from Bulgaria formed in 2001. Their sound is an original electro-acoustic world fusion influenced by the sacred and folk music traditions of Bulgaria, the Balkans, Persia, the Middle East, North Africa and India, as well as by the musical and spiritual heritage of Byzantium and Medieval Europe.

Irfan extensively uses ethereal and mystic female vocals in addition to strong male vocals and choirs in combination with an assortment of traditional Bulgarian, Balkan, Oriental, Persian and Indian string, wind, key and percussive instruments woven into a delicate ambient electronic sound. The band’s name is borrowed from the Sufi’s terminology and means “gnosis”, “secret knowledge” or “revelation”.

Since 2003 Irfan has been on the French label Prikosnovénie with three released albums and several movie and theatrical soundtracks. Over the last decade Irfan toured with great success across Europe (Germany, The Netherlands, Belgium, Spain, Portugal, France, Denmark, Switzerland, Austria, The Czech Republic, Poland, Lithuania, Romania, Bulgaria, etc.) and performed live at some of the main European Gothic, neo folk, medieval and world music festivals and events.

== Discography ==
Full-length albums and EPs:

- Irfan (2003) - Prikosnovénie/Noir Records
- Seraphim (2007) - Prikosnovénie
- The Eternal Return (2015) - Prikosnovénie
- Roots (2018) - self-released

Compilation appearances:

- 'Otkrovenie' on Fairy World No. 1 Prikosnovénie (2003)
- 'Otkrovenie' on Dancing in the Dark: 10 Years of Dancing Ferret Dancing Ferret Discs (2005)
- 'Stella Splendens' on Fairy World II Prikosnovénie (2005)
- 'Otkrovenie' on Asleep By Dawn Magazine DCD 2005 Tour CD Asleep By Dawn (2005)
- 'Peregrinatio' on Asleep By Dawn Magazine DCD 2005 Tour CD Asleep By Dawn (2005)
- 'Star of the Winds' on Dancing in the Dark 2006: A Dancing Ferret Compilation Dancing Ferret Discs (2006)
- 'Fei' on Effleurment: A Prikosnovénie Compilation Prikosnovénie (2006)
- Simurgh on Fairy World III Prikosnovénie (2007)

== Band members ==
- Ivailo Petrov—oud, baglama saz, tambura, santour, setar, programming
- Kalin Yordanov—vocals, daf, bodhran
- Peter Todorov—darbouka, tombak, riq, electronic percussion pad
- Yasen Lazarov—kaval, nay, duduk, harmonium
- Darina Zlatkova—vocals
