= Ataraxia (band) =

Italian neoclassical dark wave band

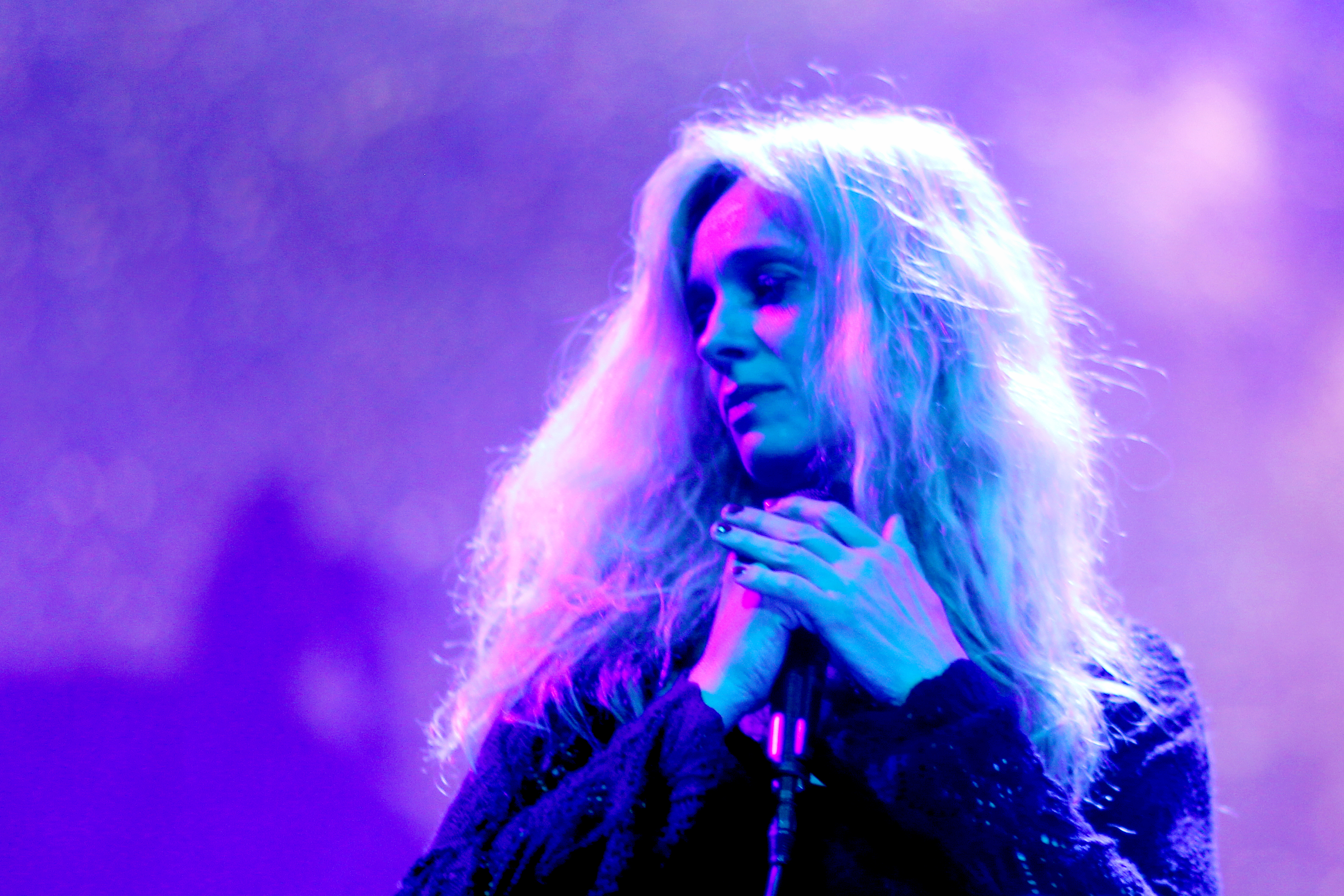
- Francesca Nicoli performing with Ataraxia at Wave-Gotik-Treffen 2018

Background information
- Origin: Modena, Italy
- Genres: Neoclassical dark wave; neofolk; dark wave
- Years active: 1990–present
- Labels: Prikosnovénie; Cold Meat Industry; Equilibrium Music; Ark Records; Infinite Fog; Shadowplay; Sleaszy Rider; The Circle Music

Ataraxia is an Italian neoclassical dark wave band founded in 1990. Fronted by vocalist Francesca Nicoli, it combines modern technology with archaic instrumentation. Its lyrical themes are frequently drawn from nature and ancient cultures.

== History ==
The band was founded by Francesca Nicoli and Michele Urbano in November 1990. In the first five years there were many musicians in the band, until finally Francesca Nicoli, Vittorio Vandelli, and Giovanni Pagliari became the basic line-up until today.

== Style and lyrical themes ==
The band combine modern technology with archaic instrumentation over various media. The members have said they have dedicated their lives to art, to explore the nobleness of centuries in many possible ways (music, poetry, theatre, and photography). They define themselves as "craftsmen of the sound" because they create an unusual mix of sacred and profane, atmospheric and experimental, contemporary and early music, using acoustic and electric instruments as well, always with such language which fits best to the actual work.

The word ataraxia is taken from Epicurean philosophy and means "equanimity", "calmness" and "unflappability". Ataraxia place themselves in a spiritual tradition from Greco-Roman and Celtic cultures. Nicoli has described the production process as "medianic" and associated it with the cult of Dionysus, where "the musician was possessed by the God of Nature who spoke through him/her". Regarding the band's pagan themes, Nicoli associates the word paganism with the countryside, and maintains that life in the countryside creates a connection to the rhythm of nature. In that sense, she considers Atarax a pagan band: "I feel that I'm in a communion with that which surrounds me".

== Members ==
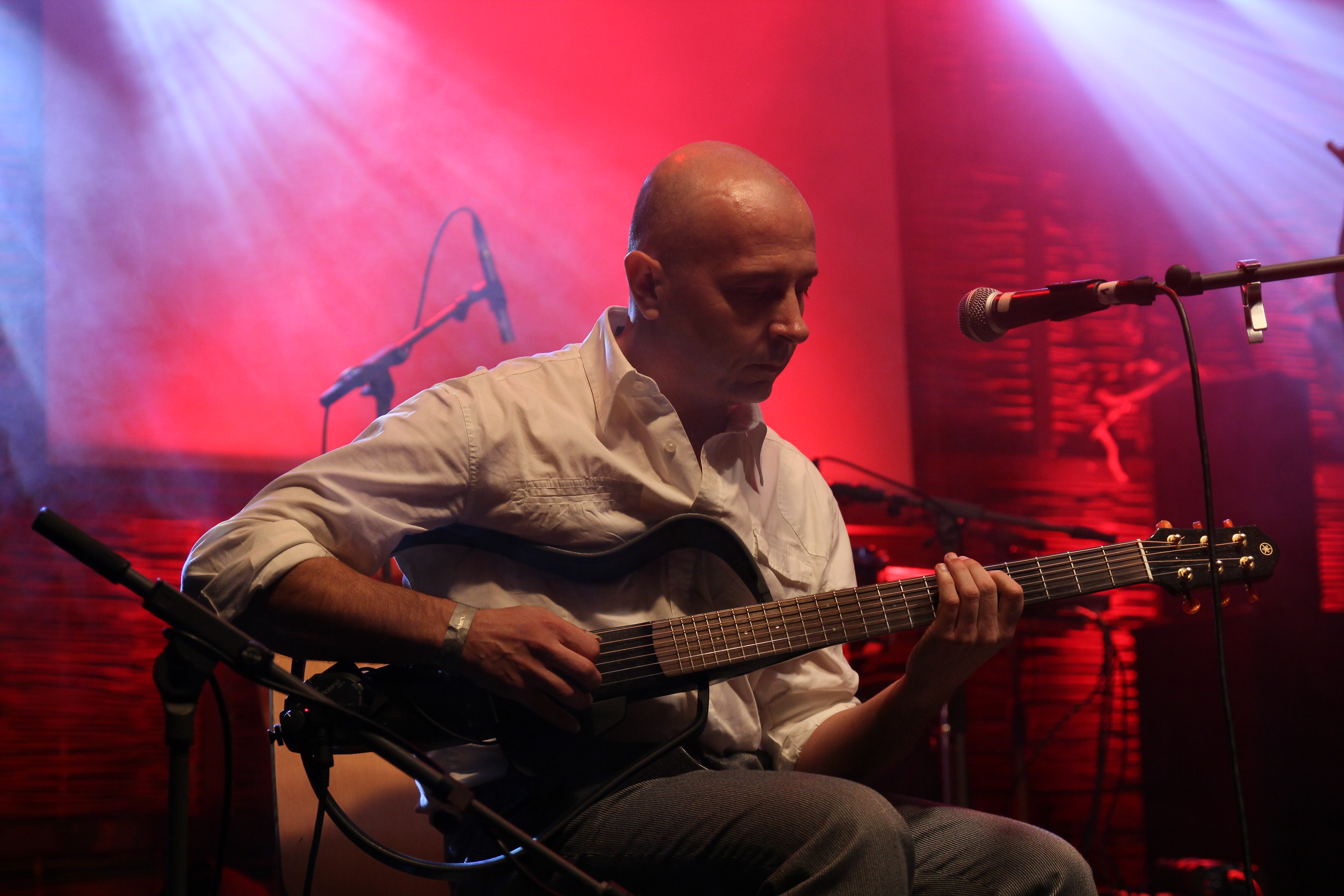
Vittorio Vandelli with Ataraxia in 2014

=== Current ===
- Francesca Nicoli - vocal, flute, programming (since 1985)
- Vittorio Vandelli - guitars, percussion, vocal, programming (since 1986)
- Giovanni Pagliari - keys, vocal, programming (since 1990)

=== Past ===
- Michele Urbano - bass (1985 – 1992)
- Donato - guitar
- Riccardo Spaggiari - percussion, drums, programming (2003 - 2021)

=== Contributors ===
- Lorenzo Busi - actor and dancer (1991 – 2003)
- Livio Bedeschi - photographer and graphic designer
- Nicolas Ramain - speech and guitar in the song "Strange Lights"
- Francesco Banchini - clarinet, flute, percussion, vocal (1999 – 2003)

== Releases ==
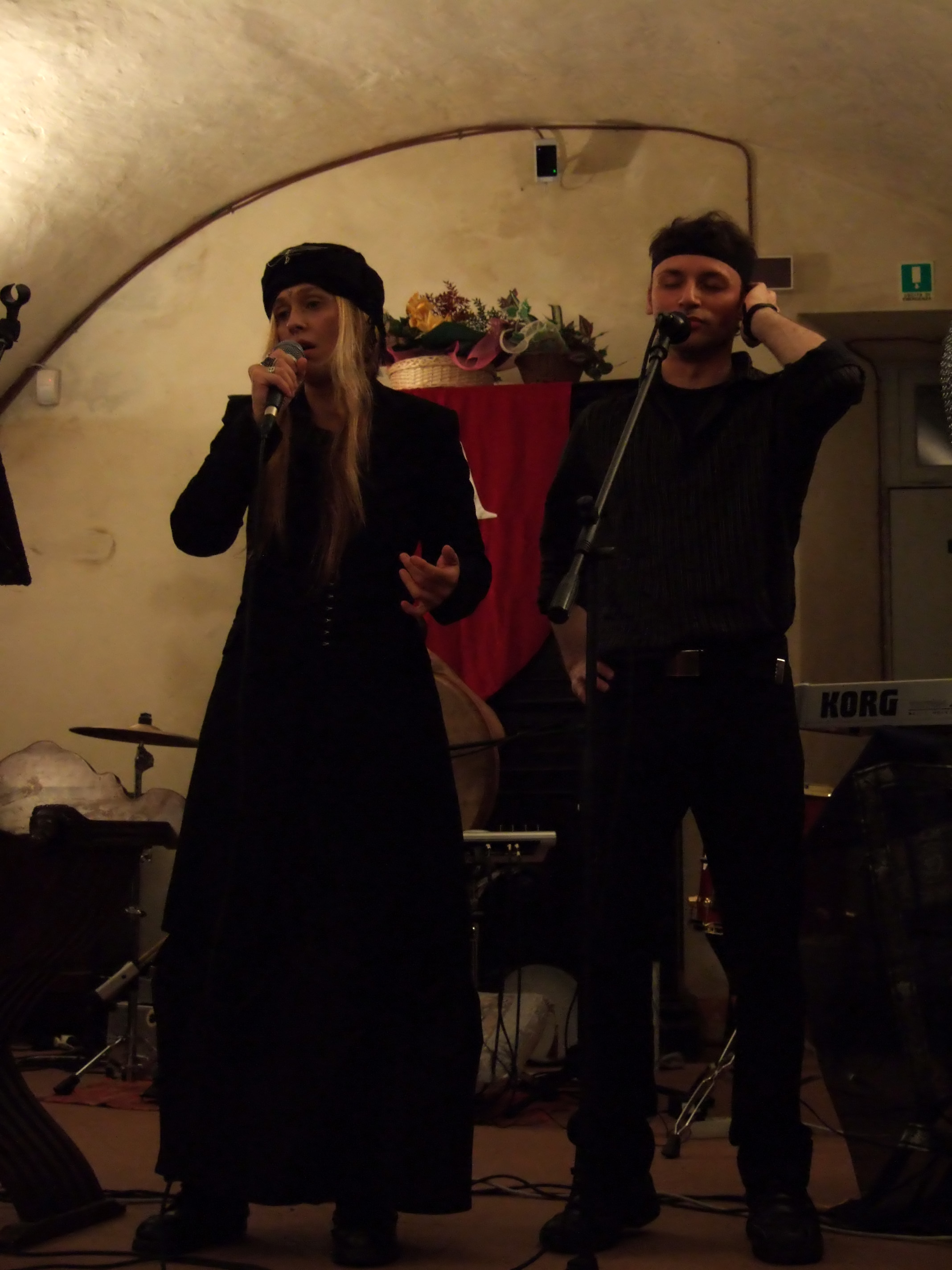
Ataraxia performing live in 2006

=== Full-length Albums ===
- Prophetia (1990)
- Nosce te ipsum (1991)
- Arazzi (1993)
- Sub ignissima luna (1993)
- Simphonia sine nomine (1994)
- Ad perpetuam rei memoriam (1994)
- La malédiction d'Ondine (1995)
- The Moon Sang on the April Chair (1995)
- Il fantasma dell'opera (1996)
- Concerto N.6: A baroque plaisanterie (1996)
- Historiae (1998)
- Lost Atlantis (1999)
- Suenos (2001)
- Mon seul désir (2002)
- Saphir (2004)
- Paris spleen (2006) (its cover features the main entrance of Cabaret de L'Enfer )
- Kremastra nera (2007)
- Llyr (2010)
- Spasms (2013)
- Wind at Mount Elo (2014)
- Ena (2015)
- Deep Blue Firmament (2016)
- Synchronicity Embraced (2018)
- Quasar (2020)
- Pomegranate – The Chant Of The Elementals (2022)
- Centaurea (2024)
- Sylfaera the Fair (2026)

=== Live albums ===
- Os cavaleiros do templo (VHS + CD) (1998)
- Strange Lights (2005 / 2009)

=== Others ===
- Orlando (maxi CD) (1998)
- Des paroles blanches (maxi CD) (2003)
- Arcana eco (book + CD) (2005)

=== Videos ===
- Nosce te ipsum (1991)
- Would the Winged Light Climb? (1995)
- Concerto No. 6. - A baroque plaisanterie (1997)
- Os cavaleiros do tempolo (1998, 2009)
- Spirito ancestrale (2002)
