= Dvar =

- Origin: Russia
- Genres: Darkwave, lightwave, electronic music
- Years active: 1995–2012, 2021-present
- Website: Official Bandcamp page

Dvar is an anonymous virtual band from Russia that plays darkwave and electronic music. The first Dvar album was released in 1995, and the most recent in 2024.

== History ==
The members of Dvar have kept their identities secrets, but there's an anonymous info that the name of one member is Darya. The Band's Discogs Webpage displays the following names: General Bee, Bee Warrior, Bee Girl, Bee Jag and Bee Svizzl. In an interview, they stated, "Dvar is something that came in a dream." Band members claim to have heard music in their dreams, presented to them by a being named Dvar. In several interviews the band has insisted that all of their music is directly inspired by the Dvar being, with the band serving as mere messengers. Some fans have claimed that the Dvar being took on the shape of a giant bee, based on the recurring theme of bees in their album artwork. They stated in an interview, when asked what they think about Kabbalah learnings, that they know Dvar is 211. In Hebrew, Dvar means Word of... or thing.

The vocals which accompany Dvar's music use what appears to be a constructed language, which displays a sound pattern that is somewhat reminiscent of ancient Semitic languages. Due to this similarity, many followers of the band claim that the "lyrics" are sung in the occult Enochian language. However, the band has given no clues as to the nature of their invented language, except to say that, like the music, the vocals merely relate the message of the Dvar being.

Their first known work was a 1998 self-released tape called Raii, though rumors have circulated of an earlier self-released tape from 1995, simply named DVAR. In 2000, the duo issued a self-released 4-track CD-R demo called Taai Liira. In 2002, the band released their first album on the Italian S.P.K.R/Radio Luxor record label, called Piirrah. In 2003, Dvar moved to the Russian label Irond and released five albums: Roah (2003), Rakhilim (2004), a 2004 re-release of Taai Liira with bonus tracks, Hor Hor (2005) and Oramah Maalhur (2005). The album Madegirah – Early Works was announced in 2005, but not be released until 2009. In 2007, the band moved to the label Gravitator and released Jraah Mraah. Their song "Teremiah K'ruun" was used in an Alfa-Bank 2007 New Year commercial. In 2008, the band released Zii under the label Art Music Group. In 2009, Fayah! was released, a dark counterpart to Zii, along with a release of Madegirah, now entitled Madegirah – Bizarre Rares and Early Works. In mid-2010, their tenth anniversary album, El Mariil was released, with an unusual medieval sound. A new album Deii was released in Russian magazine "Мир Фантастики" (English: Mir Fantastiki a.k.a. World of Sci-Fi) in mp3 320 kbit/s format. Physical copies of the album were released in December 2012 on Shadowplay Records. The release consists of two parts (two 16-track CDs) in Digipack format.

In December 2021, after 9 years of silence, the band released their new single n'aharii on bandcamp and Spotify, announcing a new album.

== Style and influences ==
The band has an idiosyncratic style combining electronic music with screeching and bird-like vocals. The lyrics, according to the band, are written in the Enochian language, though they claim that they do not understand most of what is told to them by the creature Dvar. The band's record label has attempted to distance the band from the "darkwave" label through inclusion in a series of compilations entitled Highlights of Lightwave.

Dvar's vocals have also appeared in some songs by Caprice, mainly "Kywitt Kywitt" and "Fae Fae Fae Fae Fae Fae Fae".

== Identity ==
Dvar has kept their identities secret, including their hometown, their ages, or exactly how many band members there are. However, Dvar is presumed to be a duo. This has led to many impostors claiming that they either are Dvar or know the identities of the band members. The band itself claims that Dvar is something "supernatural" that is delivered through them to share with the world.

== Discography ==
- Dvar (1995) (cassette tape)
- Raii (1997) (cassette tape) (self-release)
- Taai Liira (2000) (4-track CD-R demo) (self-release)
- Hissen Raii (2002) (self-release)
- Piirrah (2002) (S.P.K.R/Radio Luxor)
- Roah (2003) (Irond)
- Rakhilim (2004) (Irond)
- Taai Liira (2004) (Re-release+bonus) (Irond)
- Hor Hor (2005) (Irond)
- Oramah Maalhur (2005) (Irond)
- Jraah Mraah (2007) (Gravitator)
- Zii (2008) (Art Music Group)
- Fayah (2009) (Art Music Group)
- Madegirah – Bizarre Rares and Early Works (2009) (Shadowplay Records)
- Piirah/Taii Liira (Re-release compilation) (2009) (Shadowplay Records)
- El Mariil (2010) (Shadowplay Records)
- Жрах Мрах (Russian edit 2010) (Shadowplay Records)
- Elah (2011 Web release and 2012 version with 3 bonus tracks)
- Deii (2012) (Shadowplay Records)
- Metah (2022) (Monopoly Records)
- Madegirah II (2023) (Ditto Music)
- Oriior (2024) (Ditto Music)

Compilations that the band appeared on:

- Edge of the Night: Russian Gothic Compilation (2000) (CD RGP)
- Per:version: vol.2 (2001) (CD Ritual)
- Triton 3 (2002) (CD Triton)
- The Best of the Best (2004) (CD PLAY)
- Love, Blood & Magic (2004) (CD)
- Colours of Black (2004) (CD Shadowplay)
- Gothic Party (2004) (CD Audio Video)
- 15 pesen dla vashey devushki (15 songs for your girl) (2004) (CD PLAY)
- Legkoye Leto (Light Summer) (2005) (CD Snegiri)
- Eclectic Music Box (2005) (CD Stereo & Video)
- Novomesto (2006) (CD Snegiri)
- Gnomy protiv el'fov (Гномы против эльфов) (2006) (split with Caprice)
- From Fantasy to Sci-Fi (2010) (Mir Fantastiki)
- Postminimalism (2010) (Stereo & Video)
- The best of 2005-2010 (2011) (Mir Fantastiki)
- Colours Of Black: Russian Neo-Folk Special (2015) (CD Shadowplay)
