= Pulse (2021 film) =

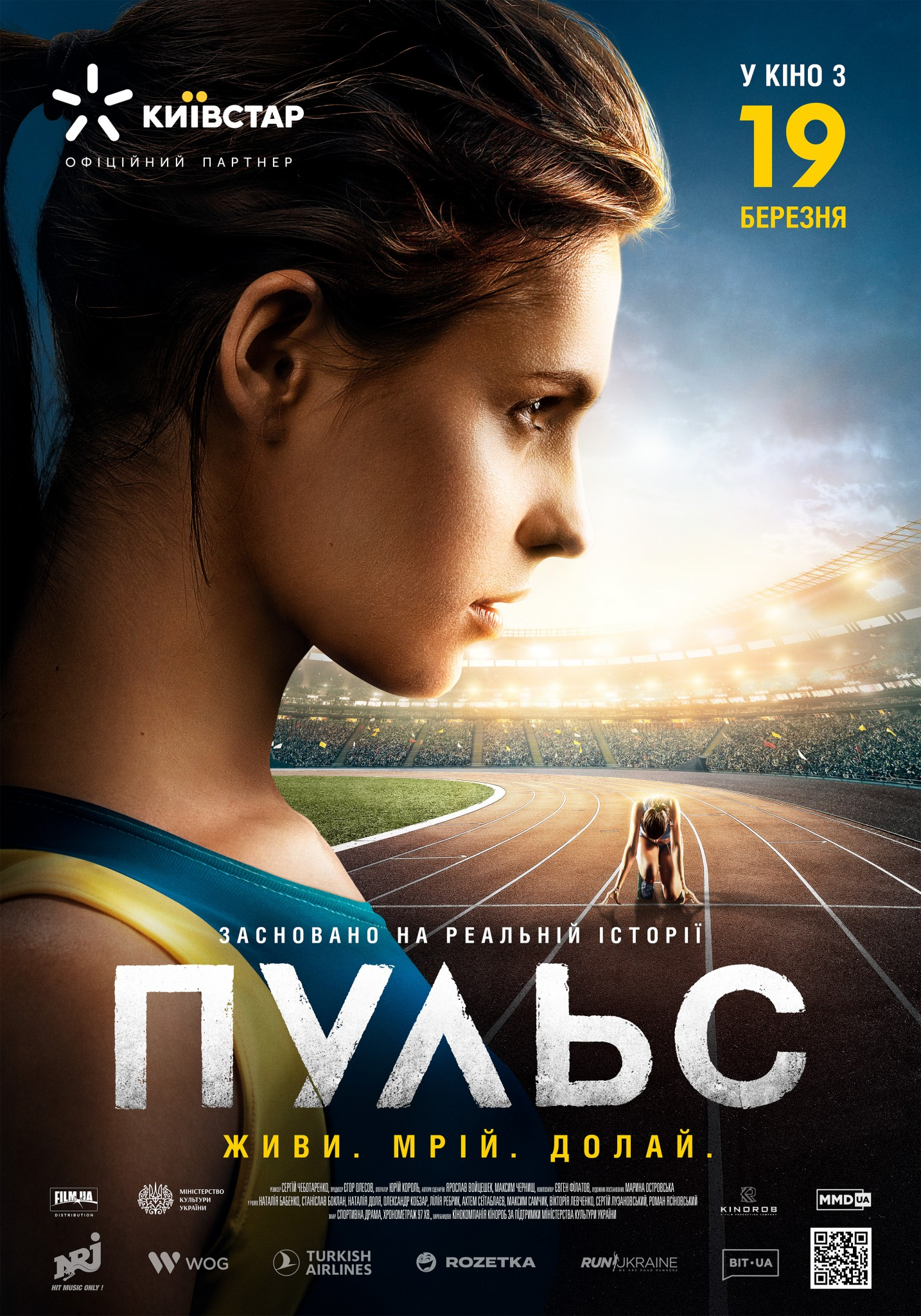
- Ukrainian promo poster
- Directed by: Sergii Chebotarenko
- Starring: Nataliia Babenko; Viktoriia Levchenko; Nataliia Dolia; Oleksandr Kobzar; Stanislav Boklan
- Production company: Film.UA
- Distributed by: Film.UA
- Release dates: 29 January 2021 (Flathead Lake International Cinemafest); 22 July 2021 (Ukraine)
- Country: Ukraine
- Language: Ukrainian

Pulse is a Ukrainian feature-length sports drama directed by Sergii Chebotarenko based on the true story of Ukrainian athlete and Paralympic champion Oksana Boturchuk. A gold medallist at the 2008 Paralympic Games, Boturchuk is also a five time silver and bronze medallist across the 2008, 2012 and 2016 Summer Paralympics. The film tells her story as a track and field athlete (personal and professional challenges after an accident left her blind and how she went international in athletics).

The film had its international festival premiere on 29 January 2021 at the Flathead Lake International Cinemafest in the United States and was officially released theatrically in Ukraine on 22 July 2021.

== Plot ==
Pulse is a sports drama based on the life of Ukrainian Paralympic champion Oksana Boturchuk.

Oksana is a promising young sprinter who dreams of the Olympics but her career is cut short when she gets in a car accident that leaves her nearly blind. Physical trauma, depression and loss of identity all take their toll on Oksana as discouraging medical prognoses compound strained family dynamics.

Instead of accepting that situation, Oksana eventually returns to training with a coach who believes in her and moves into Paralympic athletics. After physical and psychological rehabilitation she makes the Ukraine Paralympic team. The film ends with her at the 2008 Summer Paralympics in Beijing (claiming her athletic comeback was a reclamation of agency and resilience).

== Cast ==
- Nataliia Babenko – Oksana
- Viktoriia Levchenko – Olena, Oksana’s sister
- Nataliia Dolia – Mother
- Oleksandr Kobzar – Father
- Stanislav Boklan – Coach Vitalii Sorochan
- Liliia Rebryk – Coach Iryna
- Akhtem Seitablaiev – Doctor
- Roman Yasinovskyi – Dmytro
- Maksym Samchyk – Maks
- Serhii Luzanovskyi – Serhii
- Dariia Barykhashvili – Anna

== Production ==
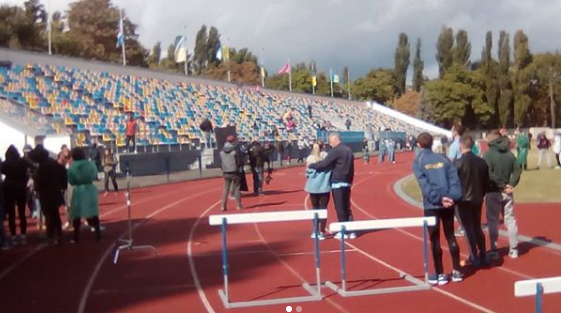
Production of the movie

Filming for Pulse began in Kyiv in March 2019. It went three blocks in 2019 - in March, back in July and September. The story is set in Ukraine but the film’s climax goes international to Beijing Paralympics. Most of the shooting was around Kyiv in Brovary and Ukrainka which doubled for local and foreign locations.

Oksana Boturchuk herself was involved from the beginning. She worked with Yaroslav Voitsekhek and Maksym Chernysh as a consultant to make sure the script was real; off the page she worked with the cast and crew through workouts, showing them what it’s really like to live life and sport with partial vision loss. That’s where her input gave the movie its emotional core and realism.

Nataliia Babenko, who plays Oksana, had to go through a physical transformation for the role. She hit the gym hard and trained with professional running coaches so she could build real athletic endurance to get the grit of competitive racing and authenticity in her performance.

== Release ==
=== Festival Release ===
Trade Media distribution company picked up Pulse in 2020 for international promotion and screening in France, Francophone Europe and Francophone Africa. It was part of the virtual Cannes Marché du Film - online version of the Cannes Film Market, which gave it exposure to distributors and festival programmers on many continents. The film’s international festival premiere was on 29 January 2021 at Flathead Lake International Cinemafest in the USA.

=== Wide release ===
The film was to be released theatrically in Ukraine on 19 March 2020 by MMD UA, but the release was postponed due to nationwide COVID-19 restrictions. The film premiered in Ukrainian cinemas on 22 July 2021 (by then MMD UA – a subsidiary of Multiplex cinema chain) had gone bankrupt due to financial difficulties caused by pandemic; distribution was taken over by Kinomania which handled theatrical release of the film.

== Reception ==
Anastasiia Sokhach of ITC.ua praised Nataliia Babenko’s performance, Yurii Korol's cinematography and director Serhii Chebotarenko's attention to detail were good but weak dialogue, lack of character development and unconvincing romantic/family relationships were bad. Oksana Honcharuk noted the strong cast of the film while Serhii Lukianenko of XSPORT called it a good but unremarkable film. The television programme Vikna-Novyny singled out Stanislav Boklan's performance. Writing for French website Homepopcorn.fr James Domb said that although there was little new to the sports drama genre the film was still enjoyable (largely because of Babenko).
