= Oratorio di San Quirino, Parma =

Building in Parma, Italy

Coordinates: 44.80117°N 10.32429°E

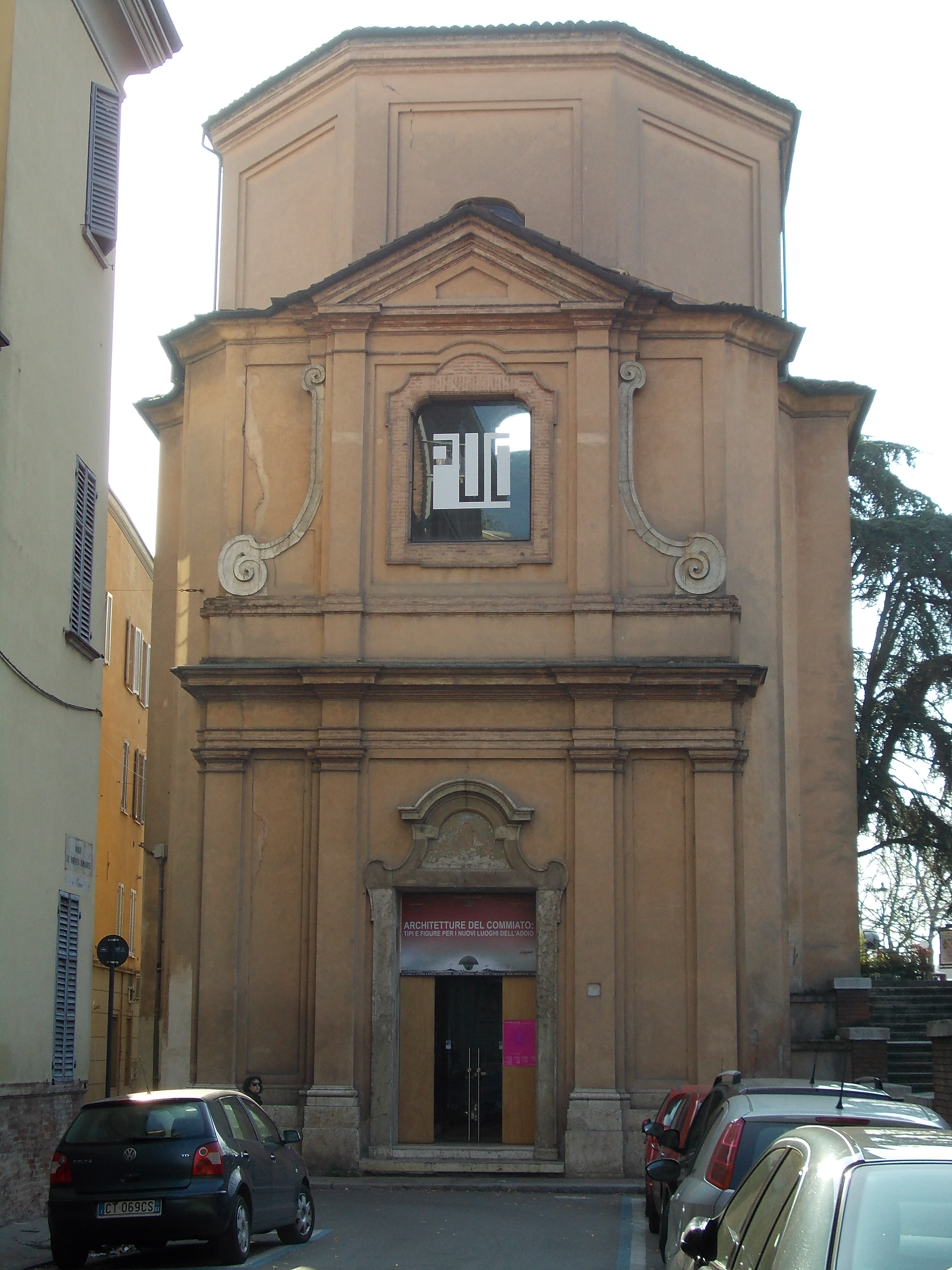

The Oratorio di San Quirino is a Baroque style, former-Roman Catholic oratory, that is a small church or chapel, located at Strada agli Ospizi Civili, alongside the east bank of the Parma river, in central Parma, Italy. The oratory has been deconsecrated and is now used for cultural events and concerts.

== History ==
The oratory was initially founded in 1331 by Garfuccio de' Garfi, and known as the oratory of Sant'Angelo dai frati Carmelitani, since it was affiliated to the Carmelite monks at the nearby monastery and church of Santa Maria del Carmine, which is also deconsecrated. The dedication was changed in 1335 to Saint Quirinus. The fraternity associated with the oratory commissioned the reconstruction in the present style in 1734 with designs by Edelberto dalla Nave. By the 19th century, the oratory had fallen in disuse, and in 1903 was deconsecrated. The interior, while in many spots bare, still has frescoes by Giovanni Bolla in the interior. Stucco statuary by Pietro Reti adorn the interior niches. The altars include works by Clemente Ruta (Birth of the Virgin) and Pietro Rubini.
