= Flëur =

Ukrainian musical group

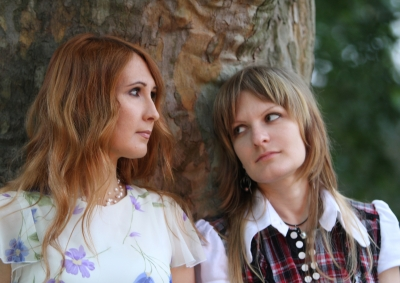
- Olena Voinarovska (left) and Olga Pulatova

Background information
- Origin: Odesa, Ukraine
- Genres: Baroque pop, folk music
- Years active: 2000–2017
- Labels: Prikosnovénie, Paularis Music Group, Lavina Music, Nikitin recording company
- Members: Ольга Пулатова (Olga Pulatova), Олена Войнаровська (Olena Voinarovska), Олексій Ткачевський (Oleksiy Tkachevsky), Катерина Котельникова (Kateryna Kotelnykova), Анастасія Кузьміна (Anastasiya Kuzmina), Євген Чеботаренко (Yevhen Chebotarenko) Alex Kozmidi

Flëur was a Ukrainian musical collective from Odesa. The collective was based around the two original members and frontwomen Olga Pulatova (Ольга Пулатова) and Olena Voinarovska (Олена Войнаровська) who wrote the lyrics, performed vocals and wrote most of the music. Although in later years, the whole collective took part in making music and arrangements, lyrics were still written solely by Olena and Olga. Flëur's musical genre is hard to define as it combines many influences. Flëur originated as cooperation of the two singer-songwriters and the music still bears a tiny resemblance to the genre, yet from the very beginning it was in a way different from typical singer-songwriter music. The first official releases also had a touch of neoclassic/ethereal music.

Because of the difficulties with picking the right term for Flëur's music, the collective itself created the term "cardiowave" (which later gave title to an independent recording label from Odesa which was releasing some of Flëur's sideprojects), but when it comes to more usual terms Flëur usually gets labeled as dream pop.

The texts of the label Prikosnovénie spoke of resemblance with Cocteau Twins, All about Eve and Bel Canto.

== Band history ==
Flëur was formed by Olga Pulatova and Olena Voinarovska in Odesa in February 2000. In March 2000 flautist Yuliya Zemlyana joined them. According to an autobiographical story by Olga Pulatova, it was Yuliya who came up with "Flëur" as a title for their collective. On 17 March they had their first live concert in Odesa. During 2000 and 2001 they were joined by Kateryna Serbina (cello), Oleksiy Tkachevsky (drums), Vitaliy Didyk (contrabass) and Oleksiy Dovhaliov(keyboards).

The first official release was the CD "Touch" (which is English translation of "Прикосновение") released on the independent French label Prikosnovénie. Only the album's title was translated to English – all the lyrics and song titles in the CD's booklet are in Russian. One month later the Ukrainian edition of the album came out under the original title "Прикосновение". Two more releases followed on the Prikosnovénie label, but these were also the last ones on this label. After that Flëur was mostly released in CIS countries.

Currently Flëur has 8 officially released albums plus reissues of two early releases. The song "Шелкопряд" ("Silkworm") had the first place in "Chart Dozen" hit-parade of Russian radio Nashe Radio — Flëur was awarded the "Chart crack" prize as best new band of 2007.

From their inception Flëur's popularity continued slowly but steadily growing. Besides live performances in their hometown of Odesa and Ukraine's Kyiv, the collective also toured extensively in Russia from 2007 to 2012, including many live performances in Moscow which presented them with a full house.

Flëur has also performed live on radio several times, had a TV slot for the song "Искупление" ("Redemption") on the Ukrainian music TV-channel M1 (video directed by Yevhen Tymokhin (Євген Тимохін), musical arrangement made by Pavlo Shevchuk (Павло Шевчук) — the producer of Mumiy Troll band).

Two more albums were released in the following years: "The Awakening" in spring 2012 and "Storm Warning" in 2014.

In early 2017, the band announced that they would be breaking up after playing three last concerts in May. Following Flëur's dissolution, Pulatova and Voinarovska have continued working on their solo musical careers.

== Side projects ==
Many current and former band members also participated in other musical projects.

- Ольга Пулатова (Olga Pulatova) was a vocalist on the projects "Аэроплан" ("Airplane") and "Оля и Монстр" ("Olya and The Monster") (both defunct now), and cooperated closely with the project "Dust Heaven".
- Олена Войнаровська (Olena Voinarovska), Олексій Ткачевський (Oleksiy Tkachevsky), former Flëur member Олексій Довгалєв (Oleksiy Dovhaliev), Катерина Котельникова (Kateryna Kotelnykova) and Анастасія Кузьміна (Anastasiya Kuzmina) took part in the projects "МРФ" ("Мой розовый фашистик", "My Little Pink Fascist") and the English language project "Amurekimuri".
- Олексій Довгальов (Oleksiy Dovhaliov) also has his own project "The Клюквінs" ("The Klukwins", «klukwa» means cranberry in Russian).
- Алла Лужецька (Alla Luzhetska) and Анастасія Кузьміна (Anastasiya Kuzmina) take part in the project "ТИМ" ("Тайный Институт Мозга", "Secret Brain Institute").
- Former Flёur member Юлія Земляна (Yulia Zemlyana) takes part in the projects "Аддарая" ("Addaraya") and "Inversus".
- Євгеній Чеботаренко (Yevheniy Chebotarenko) has his own group "My Personal Murderer".

== Members ==
- Ольга Пулатова (Olga Pulatova) — piano, vocals
- Олена Войнаровська (Olena Voinarovska) — guitar, vocals
- Олексій Ткачевський (Oleksiy Tkachevsky) — drums
- Катерина Котельникова (Kateryna Kotelnykova) — keyboards
- Анастасія Кузьміна (Anastasiya Kuzmina) — violin
- Євгеній Чеботаренко (Yevgeniy Chebotarenko) — bass guitar

== Former members ==
- Юлія Земляна (Yulia Zemlyana) — flute
- Катерина Сербіна (Kateryna Serbina) — cello
- Олексій Довгальов (Oleksiy Dovhaliov) — keyboards, acoustic guitar
- Віталій Дідик (Vitaliy Didyk) — contrabass, bass guitar
- Олександра Дідик (Aleksandra Didyk) — cello
- Алла Лужецька (Alla Luzhetska) — flute
- Владислав Міцовський (Vladyslav Mitsovsky) — percussion
- Георгій Матвіїв (Georgiy Matviyiv) — bandura

== Session members ==
- Володимир Нессі (Volodymyr Nessi) — bass guitar
- Андрій Басов (Andriy Basov) — electric guitar
- Alex Kozmidi — electric guitar, bass guitar
- Георгій Матвіїв (Georgiy Matviyiv)

== Discography ==
=== Albums, released in Russia and Ukraine ===
- 2002 — Прикосновение ("Soft Touch")

No.	Title	Length
1.	"Интро"	0:35
2.	"Синие тени"	4:36
3.	"На обратной стороне луны"	3:38
4.	"Укол"	4:12
5.	"Это всё для тебя, танцующий Бог"	5:35
6.	"Печальный клоун"	4:05
7.	"Карусель"	6:31
8.	"На мягких лапах"	3:46
9.	"Колыбельная для Солнца"	4:56
10.	"Сердце"	4:11
11.	"Золотые воды Ганга"	5:51
12.	"Уходи, Февраль!"	3:50
13.	"Как всё уходит"	4:44

- 2003 — Волшебство ("Magic")

No.	Title	Length
1.	"Интро"	0:49
2.	"Пустота"	3:51
3.	"Почти реально"	5:09
4.	"Формалин"	4:03
5.	"Печальный клоун"	5:00
6.	"Когда ты грустишь"	3:22
7.	"Баллада о белых крыльях и алых лепестках"	5:29
8.	"Ремонт"	4:01
9.	"Медальон"	4:36
10.	"Я сделаю это"	5:07
11.	"Никогда"	4:29
12.	"Струна"	5:37
13.	"Русская рулетка"	5:33
14.	"Легион"	4:57
15.	"Горизонт"	4:22

- 2004 — Сияние ("Shining")

No.	Title	Length
1.	"Интро"	0:37
2.	"Кокон"	4:42
3.	"Зафиксировать вечность"	4:24
4.	"Небо хочет упасть"	3:43
5.	"Сияние"	5:03
6.	"Будь моим смыслом"	5:22
7.	"Взрывная волна"	3:31
8.	"Сладость"	6:19
9.	"Ты не можешь мне запретить"	6:16
10.	"Кто-то"	4:33
11.	"Друг, который никогда не предаст"	3:29
12.	"Музыка странного сна"	5:16
13.	"Над водопадом"	4:32
14.	"Тайна"	4:09
15.	"Мост над туманным заливом"	5:22

- 2006 — Всё вышло из-под контроля ("Everything is out of control")

No.	Title	Length
1.	"Шелкопряд"	5:03
2.	"Рай на полчаса (Radio Edit)"	3:59
3.	"Пепел"	4:43
4.	"Память"	5:33
5.	"Искупление (Radio Edit)"	3:28
6.	"Опьянённые нежностью"	4:55
7.	"Улыбки сфинксов"	5:59
8.	"Эволюция. Тщетность"	6:52
9.	"Люди, попавшие в шторм"	5:51
10.	"Я всё ещё здесь"	4:53
11.	"Сегодня"	4:17
12.	"Тёплые воды"	5:31
13.	"Всё вышло из-под контроля"	4:03
14.	"Для того, кто умел верить"	5:42

- 2008 — Эйфория ("Euphoria")

No.	Title	Length
1.	"Интро"	0:36
2.	"Волна"	3:34
3.	"Отречение"	4:17
4.	"Новое матное слово"	5:08
5.	"Исполинские чёрные грифы"	3:20
6.	"Тёплые коты"	4:13
7.	"Эйфория"	5:24
8.	"Никто не должен прийти"	5:13
9.	"Два облака"	5:17
10.	"Ресница"	4:02
11.	"...и Солнце встаёт над руинами"	5:18
12.	"Река времён"	4:35
13.	"Коралловые небеса"	3:47
14.	"Мечты"	4:31
15.	"Мы никогда не умрём"	4:14

- 2008 — Почти живой ("Almost alive") and Сердце ("Heart") — reissue of unofficial releases from the years 2000–2001

"Почти живой"

No.	Title	Length
1.	"Синие тени"	4:21
2.	"Печальный клоун"	4:22
3.	"Золотые воды Ганга"	5:21
4.	"Маленькие феи"	3:43
5.	"Рай на полчаса"	4:28
6.	"Уходи, февраль!"	4:02
7.	"Экзорцизм"	4:05
8.	"Обескровленная Мэри"	6:15
9.	"Сердце мира"	5:22
10.	"Никогда"	4:40

"Сердце"

No.	Title	Length
1.	"Печальный клоун"	4:24
2.	"Зафиксировать вечность"	4:46
3.	"Осеннее равноденствие"	3:45
4.	"Это все для тебя, Танцующий Бог"	5:03
5.	"Маленькие феи"	3:03
6.	"Настоящее что-нибудь"	3:02
7.	"Сны в раскаленной пустыне"	5:18
8.	"Опасная бритва"	3:58
9.	"Струна"	5:53
10.	"Сердце"	3:58
11.	"Как все уходит"	4:26

- 2010 — Тысяча светлых ангелов ("Thousands of bright angels")

No.	Title	Length
1.	"Интро"	0:47
2.	"Зов маяка"	4:27
3.	"Разбег"	5:03
4.	"Человек 33 черты"	6:55
5.	"Дирижабли"	3:53
6.	"Да, это так"	4:41
7.	"Расскажи мне о своей катастрофе"	6:13
8.	"Розовый слон"	5:06
9.	"Амулет"	7:51
10.	"Камень"	3:30
11.	"Качели"	4:53
12.	"Летняя ночь, летящая в пустоте"	7:02
13.	"Апрельское утро"	5:00
14.	"Тёплая осень"	3:33
15.	"Лунные лилии"	6:06
16.	"Последний танец зимы"	5:38
17.	"Непобедимая армия"	5:27

- 2012 — Пробуждение ("Awakening")

No.	Title	Length
1.	"Интро"	1:04
2.	"Живое"	4:03
3.	"Тридцать семь"	5:01
4.	"Шиповник"	5:02
5.	"Это будет моим ответом"	3:52
6.	"Великое ничто"	6:07
7.	"Спасти"	3:21
8.	"Вальсаутро"	2:01
9.	"Vakna 1"	1:36
10.	"Дикое сердце"	3:42
11.	"Маятник вечности"	6:48
12.	"Проповедники"	6:44
13.	"Оборвалось"	3:57
14.	"Vakna 2"	3:08
15.	"Мир потерянных вещей"	4:44
16.	"Спасибо"	5:11

- 2014 — Штормовое предупреждение ("Storm Warning")

No.	Title	Length
1.	"Интро"	0:16
2.	"Железо поёт"	4:42
3.	"Мы летали"	4:57
4.	"Кислород"	6:14
5.	"После кораблекрушения"	5:20
6.	"Рамки"	5:11
7.	"Тростник"	6:44
8.	"Утешитель"	5:19
9.	"Зеркальный портал"	5:19
10.	"Магия"	5:25
11.	"Черта"	5:35

=== Albums released in France ===
- 2002 – Prikosnovenie ("Soft Touch")

French edition of "Прикосновение".

No.	Title	Length
1.	"Intro"	0:35
2.	"Blue Shades"	4:36
3.	"On the Dark Side of the Moon"	3:38
4.	"Injection"	4:12
5.	"Dancing God"	5:35
6.	"A Sad Clown"	4:05
7.	"Carrousel"	6:31
8.	"By the Soft Paws"	3:46
9.	"Lullaby for the Sun"	4:56
10.	"The Heart"	4:11
11.	"Golden Waters of Gang"	5:51
12.	"February"	3:50
13.	"Fadeaway"	4:44

- 2003 – Volshebstvo ("Magic")

French edition of "Волшебство".

No.	Title	Length
1.	"Intro"	0:49
2.	"The Emptiness"	3:51
3.	"Almost Real"	5:09
4.	"Formalin"	4:03
5.	"The Ballad Of White Wings And Scarlet Petals"	5:29
6.	"Repair"	4:01
7.	"Medallion"	4:36
8.	"I Will Do It"	5:07
9.	"Never"	4:29
10.	"The String"	5:37
11.	"Russian Roulette"	5:33
12.	"Legion"	4:57
13.	"Horizon"	4:22

- 2004 – Siyanie ("Shine")

French edition of "Сияние".

No.	Title	Length
1.	"Intro"	0:37
2.	"Cocoon"	4:42
3.	"To Fix the Eternity"	4:24
4.	"The Sky Wants to Fall Down"	3:43
5.	"Shining"	5:03
6.	"Be My Sense"	5:22
7.	"You Can't Forbid It to Me"	6:16
8.	"Someone"	4:33
9.	"Friend That Will Never Betray"	3:29
10.	"Strange Dream Music"	5:16
11.	"Over the Waterfall"	4:32
12.	"Mystery"	4:09
13.	"The Bridge over Misty Bay"	5:22

=== Collections ===
- 2007 — Флёрография ("Fleurography")
- 2007 — Трилогия ("Trilogy"): "Прикосновение"/"Soft Touch", "Волшебство"/"Magic" and "Сияние"/"Shining"
- 2008 – Discography (all albums in MP3)

=== Singles ===
- 2007 (December) — Два Облака ("Two clouds")

No.	Title	Length
1.	"Два облака"	4:39
2.	"Тёплые коты"	4:13
3.	"Голубые мягкие пластинки (live)"	3:53
4.	"Моральный ущерб (live)"	3:46

=== Unofficial releases ===
- 2000 (July) — Почти живой ("Almost alive")
- 2001 (January) — Сердце ("Heart")
- 2001 (November) — Special Edition
