= Von Magnet =

British theatre music band

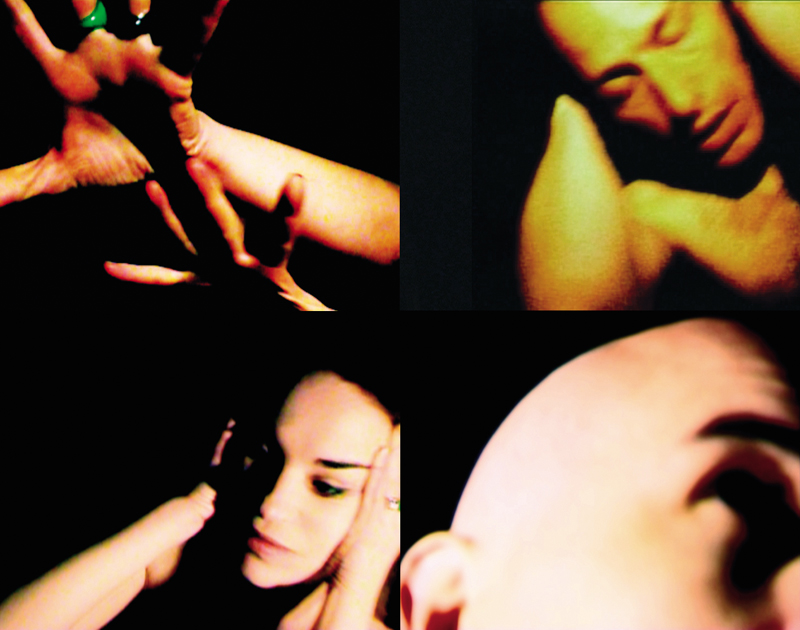

Background information
- Origin: France
- Genres: Electronic music, flamenco, dark wave, performance art, coldwave, post-industrial, industrial music
- Years active: 1985–present
- Labels: Jarring Effects; Ant-Zen
- Members: Flore Magnet; Phil Von; Def; Hugues Villette; Tit'o; Lisa May; Severine Krouch; Nicolas Priouzeau; Alexia Lauret
- Past members: Sabine Van Den Oever; Yana Maizel; Jérome Soudan (Mimetic); Luz Elena Nieto; Erik Yaeger; Laurence Abraham; Pierre Vildard (Sigmoon); Alain Baumann (Stocha); Rosa Sanchez; Samia Doukali; Richard Cuvillier; Thierry Noyer (TNO); Gregory Pignot (Servo); Christophe Coutant
- Website: https://www.vonmag.net/

Von Magnet is a theatre music band that originated in the post-industrial musical current of the 1980s. Founded in 1985 in London, the group gathered around Flore Magnet (stage direction, actions, vocals) and Phil Von (composition, feet percussion, vocals) initiating a style of their own which they named "Electroflamenco". Becoming rapidly well known in the underground because of their new approach to electronic music, firstly by incorporating the bases of flamenco (rhythms, dances and melodies) then later adding influences of Middle Eastern music.

This electronic ethnic mix, often referred to as "expressionist" or even tribal music, features also references to contemporary and cinematographic soundscapes, (Andreï Tarkovski, John Cassavetes, Carlos Saura, Amos Gitai, etc.). Their compositions, either instrumental or vocal melodramas, poetic, lyrical, cabaret crooning are sung or spoken in different languages; English, Spanish, French, and also in Arabic, German, Turkish or Russian. Since 1985, even before the "Computer music" era, they experimented within the likes of the post-industrial musical movement (Greater Than One, Cabaret Voltaire, SPK, Coil...) using intensive sound collage and sampling techniques. This work will give birth to their motto: "Sample us as we have already sampled you".

Although strongly focused around the music component, the peculiarity of Von Magnet is to endeavour the recurrent relationship between theatrical actions, dance as well as visual or performance arts, resulting in the creation of "staged" concerts. These multidisciplinary performances bring together musicians, actors, dancers, sculptors, video artists... destabilizing the codes or the staging conventions, the musicians become acting characters whereas the dancers/actors are bound to participate in live sound creation. Fiona Kelso joined them in a brief tour in 1989.

== History ==
=== London, the "Electroflamenco" initiation. El Sexo Sur Realista. 1985–1990 ===
After a collaboration with Robert Rental (The Normal) with whom they prepared their first demo tapes, Von Magnet, helped by Hugh Griffiths at the Remaximum studios, composed their first auto-produced E.P : "I". The record, firstly confidential, was soon distributed within Europe and featured in the charts of the independent music dance clubs. Coming from the world of theatre (Flore Magnet, Samia Doukali), visual arts (Laurence Abraham, Erik Yaeger) or music (Stocha, Phil Von), the different individuals forming the group invented a style of performance which combined all of those disciplines.

In parallel, they were initiated to flamenco rhythms (palmas, zapateados, palos) by dancer Nuria Garcia and guitarist Mick Jingle (members of the London Peña Flamenca) who both contributed to the first showings and tours. Von Magnet met with music wizard Phil Erb (keyboard player of the group Psychic TV) as well as producer Ken Thomas (Psychic TV, Test Dept, Sigur Rós, Dave Gahan, The Sugarcubes, Moby, Yann Tiersen, Current 93...), with whom they achieved their album El Sexo Sur-Realista, their first Electroflamenco manifesto inspired from Federico Garcia Lorca and Salvador Dalí, iconic flamenco artists Camarón de la Isla, Lole y Manuel, Enrique Morente as well as from early electronic acts such as Suicide, Deutsch Amerikanische Freundschaft, The Residents...).

This performance, outlined in the London underground club scenes, then presented in diverse theatre festivals (Institute of Contemporary Arts, LIFT, National Review of Live Art...) went on to tour throughout Europe with the help of the Dutch agency NL Centrum. The scenography of the performance is set around a saw dust arena (a reference to bullfighting) surrounded by television screens and two opposite stages. Metal costumes hung from the ceiling, objects made out of wire (creations of Andalusian sculptor artist Manuel Olarte), physical actions, slide projections, flamenco dance and guitar, saxophone (Stocha), singing and electronic sequences are fused together to form this first interdisciplinary piece.

=== "Cybergypsies", the quest for a "total physical theatre" performance. Computador and El Grito. 1990–1994 ===
Von Magnet left London to lead a new nomadic life following the path of different residencies and tours in Europe. They settled for a while in Barcelona, then Brittany, Paris, Amsterdam and Lille. The Rencontres Transmusicales Festival commissioned them for the creation of major multidisciplinary performance. Computador was born. Partially invented inside an abandoned slaughterhouse in Badalona (Catalonia) then created in a church in Rennes, the show was later on modified and re-adapted inside old disused factories or odd alternative spaces (hospital, warehouses, etc.).

With that "off" or non-stage production, the band became a real collective, close to street theatre or circus companies, sometimes compared to La Fura Dels Baus. With stages on wheels, moving objects and giant sculptures (Manuel Olarte), ingenious MIDI triggering, Pani projections (designed by Thierry Noyer), futuristic characters hanging in the air, acrobatics, contemporary and flamenco dance, water, fire and welding. Computador talked about mutations, human (physical or psychological) or material (scenographic), pushing the limits which can define a performance piece, questioning the place, voyeurism and comfort of an audience as well as constantly transforming the space and actions. The troupe expanded with the encounter of Spanish performer & actress Rosa Sanchez, Austrian performer Franz F. Feigl and French musician TNO.

More artists arrived to collaborate on different presentations of this big project (Mariana Bouhsira, Gregory Ryan, William Petit, Rob Verdegaal, Patricia Ruyters, John Wagland, Kate Tierney, Ken Thomas, Mick Jingle, et al.). The album Computador portrayed the soundtrack studio version of the show as a musical drama. It was recorded by Norscq (aka JLM from the cult band The Grief) and again produced in London by Ken Thomas for the French record label Danceteria.

=== Berlin, entrance in the world of Ballet. Nuevas Cruzes. 1995–1997 ===
To access a different network of smaller venues on a broader scale, Flore Magnet, Laurence Abraham, Rosa Sanchez, Stocha, Phil Von & Erik Yaeger, decided to condense their favourite themes. Coming back to a new concert-performance formula, this time more accessible, the show "Flamenco mutants" took place in rock venues, discothèques or art galleries. The guitarist Sigmoon, aka Pierre Vildard, joined the venture. The last chapter of their electroflamenco trilogy, El Grito, produced by Norscq for Danceteria, proposed an opus of maturity which summed up their experience of industrial gypsy life. After paying tribute to Salvador Dalí (El Sexo Sur-Realista) & Andreï Tarkovski (Computador), this time it is Luis Buñuel & Jean Cocteau who are honoured in El Grito. New guest musicians excelled on that record, Simon Lee (cajon), Micha S. Zanx (electric guitars) and Richard Cuvillier, trumpet player, composer and sound engineer who also played on the record Mezclador and live for De L'Aimant.

Invited by choreographer Jan Linkens to create the ballet Nuevas Cruzes at the Komische Oper Berlin, Von Magnet mutated once again, proposing a different musical approach. More acoustic or even "electro-rock", they brought a specific selection of songs onto the opera stage in the middle of the classical ballet dancers. The percussionist Jérome Soudan aka Mimetic (Tétines Noires, Art Zoyd) became the first drummer of Von Magnet. Countertenor singer François Testory (Lindsay Kemp company), whom they met in London for El Sexo Sur-realista, was invited especially for the occasion. Nuevas Cruzes was presented in Berlin for three years, then toured throughout Europe. It is that encounter with the world of German Ballet which led Von Magnet to work for choreographer Mario Schröder in Kiel (Guten Morgen Du Schöne, Fight Club) and the Anhaltisches Theater in Dessau.

=== The Mediterranean/oriental mix. Mezclador / El Planeta. 1997–2002 ===
After the completion of the arrangements on the album Mezclador (produced by Norscq), Stocha (aka Alain Baumann) left Von Magnet to dedicate himself to his work with Konic Theatre. With this record, Phil Von, inspired by film director Tony Gatlif and his film Latcho Drom took Von Magnet away from its flamenco influences and approached more diverse horizons. This time the music wanders towards Oriental, Mediterranean or even Eastern European sound atmospheres. The concert-performance Mezclador experimented again with some daring ideas of scenic destabilisation, this time using three stage areas, lighting sculptures and objects (created by visual artist Angelino), television screens, vinyl scratch (musician ON OFF aka Christophe Coutant) and choreographed physical actions in the midst of the audience.

Stalker Project, a performance especially designed for 3 old factories (in France, Germany & the Netherlands) was set around four cardinal stages encircling the public and featuring a special collaboration with contemporary dancer Myriam Gourfink.

The next stage production El Planeta gathered Mimetic (drums, electronics), Sigmoon (acoustic & electric instruments), Flore Magnet (vocals) and Phil Von (vocals & flamenco dance), a strong quartet for a frontal concert accompanied by video projections showing the graphic cybernetic visual creations of artist Servovalve. After Phil Von's solo album in Morocco with the Gnawa musicians of Fès (album and performances "L'Autre Nuit"), Von Magnet delved into different interpretations on the thematics of rituals or trance which somehow marked the live experience of the band. Still opening up to a wider range of musical landscapes, but this time with a slight Sufi flavour, the record El Planeta, mainly programmed by Mimetic & Phil Von, held a more electronic feel. The acoustic components remained with the multi-instrumental virtuosity of Sigmoon (bouzouki, sitar, israj, santur) and the Balkan style of violin player Frank Dematteïs.

=== Back to the roots of Flamenco. De L'Aimant. 2003–2007 ===
With the direction of two singular "made to measure" big scale projects, 1+1+1+ =1 a piece written for twelve young Turkish artists at the International Theatre Festival of Izmit, and Deadline Now created in Portugal with the company Persona for the festival Imaginarius, Von Magnet approached the world of street theatre.

In 2005, Flore and Phil decided to go back to their vision of modern flamenco. De L’Aimant (literal translation of Von Magnet in French) revisited the obsessive rhythms and patterns (buleria, soleares, siguiriya, fandango...) which kept haunting the band. The discovery of young talent Sabine Van Den Oever in The Hague allowed each song to be coloured by a touch of feminine flamenco guitar. In De L’Aimant the essence of musical theatricality, poetical lyrics and cinema references (John Cassavetes, Andreï Tarkovski, David Lynch, etc.) remained. The performance, although more traditionally flamenco, was atypical. Placed on a cross shaped stage structure in the center of a venue, each branch held one of the performer/singer/guitarist/dancer, directly aimed towards the public who was invited to move around the 360° scenic installation. Yana Maizel, flamenco dancer and cajon player completed the line-up. Circular images projections were created by film maker Xavier Ameller. The last production occurred in the Musée des Beaux Arts of Lille during a Francisco de Goya exhibition.

The same year, Holeg Spies, electronic musician and composer, achieved Spies under Von Magnet Influence, an album made out of his own versions of classic Von Magnet songs.

=== Staging Magnetism. Neither Predator Nor Prey and Polarized. 2008–2013 ===
In its own intimate poetic way Ni Prédateur Ni Proie or Neither Predator Nor Prey broached the delicate subject of the Israeli-Palestinian conflict and the complex situation in the Middle East. The album was more instrumental but resolutely industrial, tribal (with intricate Arabic percussions) and dark. Def, who had been sound engineering and shaping the live sound of the band (and also among many other acts for Diamanda Galas & Balkan Beat Box), became co-composer of the project and joined Flore Magnet & Phil Von on stage. The performance created from this CD was co-produced with the help of T.O.T.E.M Materia Prima in Nancy & Emmetrop in Bourges. The piece was a metaphor of the "wall" which stands between two human beings and two close worlds. It radically cut up the theatre hall in two-halves splitting the public in two groups. Two characters lived back to back in two rooms (a kitchen and a bedroom), separated by a white wall/screen but linked to each other by a video surveillance system.

With its latest performance Polarized, Von Magnet returned to the conquest of classic theatre stages and pushed the idea of the confrontation between opposite poles, neighbour territories and conflicting characters. The arrival of new members : Tit’o, electric guitar player with the groups Picore, Uzul Prod. and Oddateee, Hugues Villette (drums) half of the electronic duet 2Kilos & More, and Lisa May (performer & dancer for the company Troubleyn Jan Fabre), complete the distribution of the concert/performance created in the Theatre of Vanves & in Le Fil St Etienne. With the release of the album Archipielagos, Von Magnet opens a new page of their career (2012/2013).

== Phil Von ==
Phil Von parallel to his work with Von Magnet is composing as well as performing for different dance-theatre and street-theatre companies. After the collaboration with Norscq on Atlas Project, he wrote the piece Compass (double string quartet + electronics) for Art Zoyd and the Musiques Nouvelles Ensemble of Jean Paul Dessy which was performed in Brussels. With Mimetic he created Groundspace for the GRM (Group of Musical Research) and the Radio France festival. He was musician & performer with Russian/German company Do Theatre (Anatomy of Fantasy), French performance company Materia Prima (Body Without Wings, Insomnia, Eternal, Batailles, Choir, Cabaret Rouge), Street Theatre companies Entre Terre et Ciel (Neige de Feu, Physalis, Alma, Envol), Underclouds (Funambus, Petites Histoires sans Gravité, VerSant) & U-Structure Nouvelle (Strip-Tease Forain, Melankholia). In 2017/18 he wrote and performed the music of the theatre play Medea written with rage in London for François Testory (DV8 Physical Theatre, Gecko, etc.) which they toured in Great Britain. He worked with butoh choreographer Sakurako in Paris for her company Re-United Now-Here (Banzaï 2.0, Corsonor, Not a Love Story) and currently in Lithuania he is composing for Sakurako and her new Baltic butoh dance-theatre company Okarukas (Now-Here, Voyager, Dolls, Spells, Here-After, Birds). Under his own name, he has released four albums: L'Autre Nuit with Gnawa music and the musicians of Fès (Prikosnovénie records), Deadline Now soundtrack of performance for the Portuguese company Persona (Thisco records) and in 2015 the more intimate Blind Ballet on Ant-Zen Records. A selection of his best soundtracks written for the street theatre company Underclouds, entitled Made Underclouds, was released in February 2019 on Zona Music (LT) and Ant-Zen (DE). In 2016. together with Somekilos from 2kilos &More, he created the tribal electro project META MEAT, which album "Metameat" was released on two labels – Ant-Zen and Audiotrauma – and toured Europe with great success. In 2019, he created in Lithuania his first solo dance-music performance Human, Lost and Found which was performed in MO Museum Vilnius, Post Gallery Kaunas and Menu Spaustuvè Vilnius. In 2020, he produced the solo album of Lithuanian folk musician Algirdas Klova. His concert collaboration "Eiti Ramyben" with classical piano musician Rokas Zubovas revisiting electronically some piano works of famous Lithuanian composer Mikalojus Konstantinas Čiurlionis was released on vinyl in 2021 on Zona Music.

== Stage productions ==
- El Sexo Sur Realista. I (1987)
- El Sexo Sur Realista. II (1989)
- Computador (1991)
- Flamenco Mutants (1993)
- El Grito (1994)
- Nuevas Cruzes (1995)
- Mezclador (1998)
- Stalker Project (2000)
- El Planeta (2001)
- 1+1+1+1 = 1 (2002)
- De L'Aimant (2005)
- Deadline Now – with company Persona (2006)
- Ni Prédateur Ni Proie (2008)
- Polarized (2010)
- Archipielagos (2013)

== Discography ==
- I (Sculptured Sounds (G.B), 12"single. Collector) (1986)
- El Sexo Sur Realista (In9 (F), CD, LP) (1987)
- Alma La (Danceteria (F), 12"single.) (1988)
- GTO meets Von Magnet (Danceteria (F), 12"single. remixes of the group "Greater than One") (1989)
- El Sexo Sur Realista live (Staalplaat (N.L), K7. Collector) (1990)
- Computador (Danceteria (F), CD, LP) (1991)
- Flamenco Mutants (Danceteria (F), 6 tracks CD, K7 & LP) (1992)
- La Centrale Magnétique (Act (F), CD Live) (1993)
- El Grito (Act (F), CD) (1994)
- Cosmogonia (Hypnobeat (D) / Tangram (F), CD remix album) (1995)
- Nuevas Cruzes (Sculptured Sounds / Opcion Sonica (Mex), CD compilation) (1996)
- Mezclador (Sculptured Sounds, CD) (1997)
- El Planeta (XIII Bis records (F) / KK Records (B), CD) (2000)
- El Sexo Sur Realista (Prikosnovénie (F), CD re-release from 1987) (2001)
- De L'Aimant (Von Magnet Records, CD) (2005)
- El Grito (Von Magnet Records, CD re-release from 1994) (2006)
- Ni Prédateur Ni Proie (Ant-Zen (D), Jarring Effects (F), CD) (2009)
- Archipielagos (Ant-Zen (D), Von Magnet Records) (2012)

== DVD ==
- Performances 1985/2013 (Von Magnet records / La Chaudière Production) (2014)

double DVD digipack with video archives / bonus audio & remixes
