= Daemonia Nymphe =

Greek music band founded in the 1990s

Δαιμόνια Νύμφη
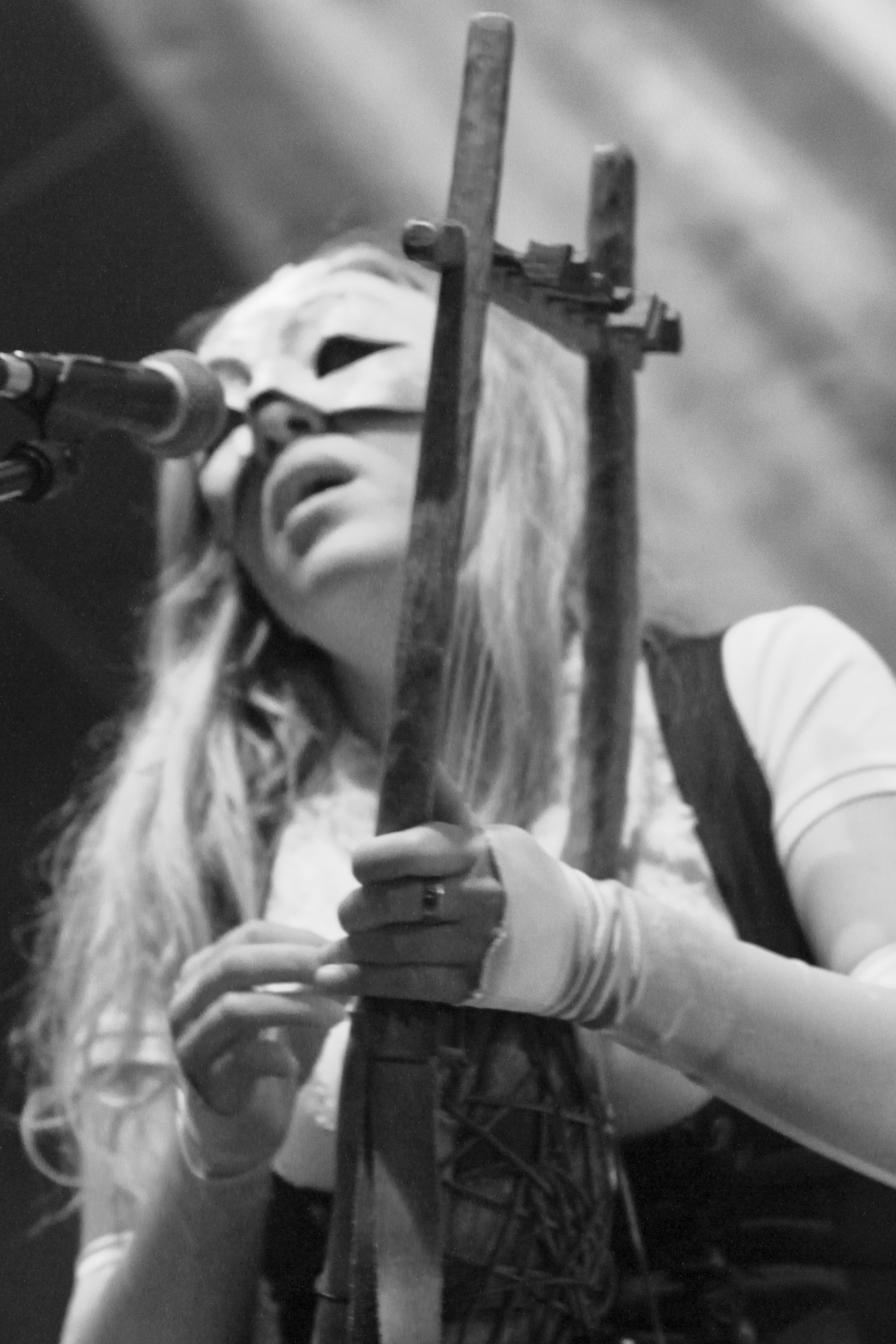
- Daemonia Nymphe (Δαιμόνια Νύμφη) performance at Wave-Gotik-Treffen 2013 in Leipzig, Heidnisches Dorf.

Background information
- Origin: Athens, Greece
- Genres: Ancient Greek music, neoclassical, neofolk
- Years active: 1994–present
- Labels: Prikosnovénie
- Members: Spyros Giasafakis; Evi Stergiou; Maria Stergiou; Christos Koukaras; Daphne Kotsiani; Vangelis Paschalidis; Stephen Street
- Website: http://www.daemonianymphe.com/

Daemonia Nymphe (Δαιμόνια Νύμφη) is a Greek music band established in 1994 by Spyros Giasafakis and Evi Stergiou. The band's music is modeled after Ancient Greek music and is often categorized as neoclassical or neofolk.

Daemonia Nymphe uses authentic instruments, including lyre, varvitos, krotala, pandoura and double flute, which are made by the Greek master Nicholas Brass. Their shows are very theatrical, with members wearing masks and ancient dresses. Their lyrics are drawn from Orphic and Homeric hymns and Sappho's poems for Zeus and Hekate.

== Members ==
- Spyros Giasafakis
- Evi Stergiou
- Maria Stergiou
- Victoria Couper
- Vangelis Paschalidis
- Stephen Street
- Christopher Brice

== Discography ==
- The Bacchic Dance of the Nymphs, 1998
- Tyrvasia, 1999
- Daemonia Nymphe, 2002
- The Bacchic Dance of the Nymphs – Tyrvasia, 2004
- Krataia Asterope, 2007
- Psychostasia, 2013
- Macbeth, 2016
