= Prikosnovénie =

French independent record label

- Founded: 1991
- Founder: Frédéric Chaplain; Sabine Adélaïde
- Genre: Ethereal wave Neoclassical dark wave
- Country of origin: France
- Location: Clisson
- Official website: prikosnovenie.com

Prikosnovénie (Russian: Прикоснове́ние) is a French independent record label founded in Nantes in 1990 by Frédéric Chaplain and Sabine Adélaïde who moved to its current home in the medieval city of Clisson in 2001. Prikosnovénie, whose name in Russian roughly translates to “light touch”, specialises in promoting darkwave, neoclassical, medieval, and heavenly voices bands that incorporate a fusion of ambient and romantic cultural sounds around from the world. The label is best known for its promotion of fairy and elven-styled music and art, which is often described as art inspired by fantasy stories such as The Lord of the Rings.

The label describes itself as a contemporary mix of England’s 4AD label and France's V.I.S.A. experimental label, and in addition to representing bands from a number of countries, including Russia, Japan, Bulgaria, Italy, France, Ukraine and Greece, the label has released a number of compilation disks further promoting the genre of music and their artists. The label now has over 70 bands signed to its roster

== History ==
=== Early Days (1990–1997) ===
In 1992, Prikosnovénie's first album, Sacrilège, was a compilation featuring 12 different new wave styled artists, but had a small distribution. In 1993, Prikosnovenie's Très Hors compilation saw a much wider distribution, which paved the way for the first release of the label's first full-length album, Cherche-Lune's Dun Emrys, released in 1994. Cherche-Lune's style of female fronted ambient vocals (typical of heavenly voices genre music) influenced Prikosnovénie to sign additional bands with similar artistic styles.

=== Electro and World Music (1997–2000) ===
A new trend of diversification was taken by the Prikosnovénie team, releasing Orange Blossom's self-titled debut, and selling more than 10,000 copies. The album was reportedly recorded in a fortnight. This development allowed the label to become professional and focussed its founders attention on new musical directions. Their first new direction was LYTCH, a label subdivision promoting electro bands such as Atlas Project, Phil Von, Mimetic and Lys.

=== Move to Clisson and The Future (2000–present) ===
The label moved its home to Clisson in Western France. At this time the label began its expansionist links with overseas artists from countries as diverse as Russia and Japan, recording them all on the Love Sessions digipack. Sabine Adélaïde also released an art collection of all the work she had done to support the artists on the label in 2002. The Fairy World Collection was released in 2003 as a commemoration of the last 10 years' output.

== Artwork ==
Some of the bands signed to Prikosnovénie have Adélaïde design their album art.

== Signed bands ==
- Ashram
- Caprice
- Collection d'Arnell Andréa
- Corde Oblique
- Daemonia Nymphe
- Flëur
- Irfan
- Ivo Sedlacek
- Jack or Jive
- Louisa John-Krol
- Maple Bee
- Mediavolo
- Mimetic
- Misstrip
- Orange Blossom
- Pinknruby
- Prajna
- Von Magnet

== See also ==
- List of record labels
