= Saline Grace =

German band

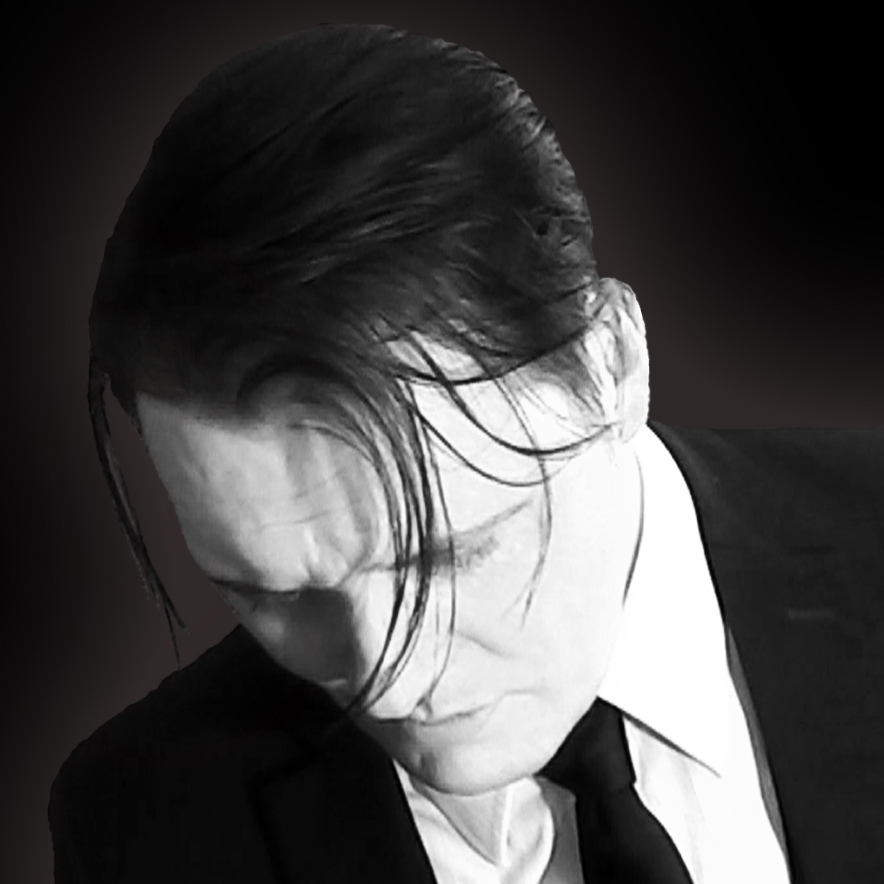
- Saline Grace – ‘The Whispering Woods’ Photo Session 2022

Background information
- Origin: Berlin, Germany
- Genre: Alternative
- Years active: 2005–present
- Label: DeeperWatersRecords
- Members: Ricardo Hoffmann; Ines Hoffmann
- Website: www.salinegrace.com

Saline Grace is a Germany-based alternative band that was founded by Ricardo Hoffmann and Ines Hoffmann (née Pollok) in 2005 and emerged from the German dark wave band Nobility Of Salt.

== History ==
=== 1994–2004 ===
Ricardo Hoffmann, singer, songwriter and multi-instrumentalist of Saline Grace, was born in the eastern border town of Frankfurt (Oder), Germany, on 21 January 1975. In 1994 he founded his first band project, becoming two years later, in 1996, the avantgarde band Nobility Of Salt. At that time the band consisted of René Hoffmann (vocal), Ricardo Hoffmann as Nobility Of Salt's songwriter (guitar, keyboards and percussion), Ines Pollok (guitar) and Stephan Weidner (bass). In 1997 the band released a first demo tape, The Evening Prayer, and moved to London, where soon afterwards Stephan Weidner left Nobility Of Salt, making room for Ines Pollok, who has assumed his role on bass until nowadays. Numerous UK gigs left appropriate traces on a further demo-tape, Through Clouds And Thoughtful Years, in 1998 and even the now defunct British music magazine Melody Maker took notice of Nobility Of Salt in its issue of 20 March 1999. "At the beginning of 2000 and after three years’ residence in Britain, the band worked on their first album in Berlin, Germany, releasing The Tremulous Sea a few months later. After releasing the EP The Silent Ship in 2002, followed a further album release, called Those Narrow Streets, in 2004. Due to organisational reasons, this should be the last Nobility Of Salt album for the time being."

=== 2005–2009 ===
These developments paved the way for Saline Grace and in 2005 Ricardo Hoffmann began to work on material for the first Saline Grace album. On this occasion, he was supported by his wife and long-term bass player, Ines Hoffmann (née Pollok), who was born on 20 July 1976 in Frankfurt (Oder) as well. Joining the former band Nobility Of Salt in 1996, she has shared the musical trail, her fate as well as the inspirations with Ricardo Hoffmann until nowadays. Saline Grace released their critically acclaimed debut album, Border Town Shades, in September 2007. In 2009 Saline Grace and Nobility Of Salt were included in Music To Die For, a book by British music journalist Mick Mercer (Melody Maker), which is an encyclopedia of the alternative and gothic scene with descriptions, interviews and discographies of the bands.

=== 2010–2012 ===
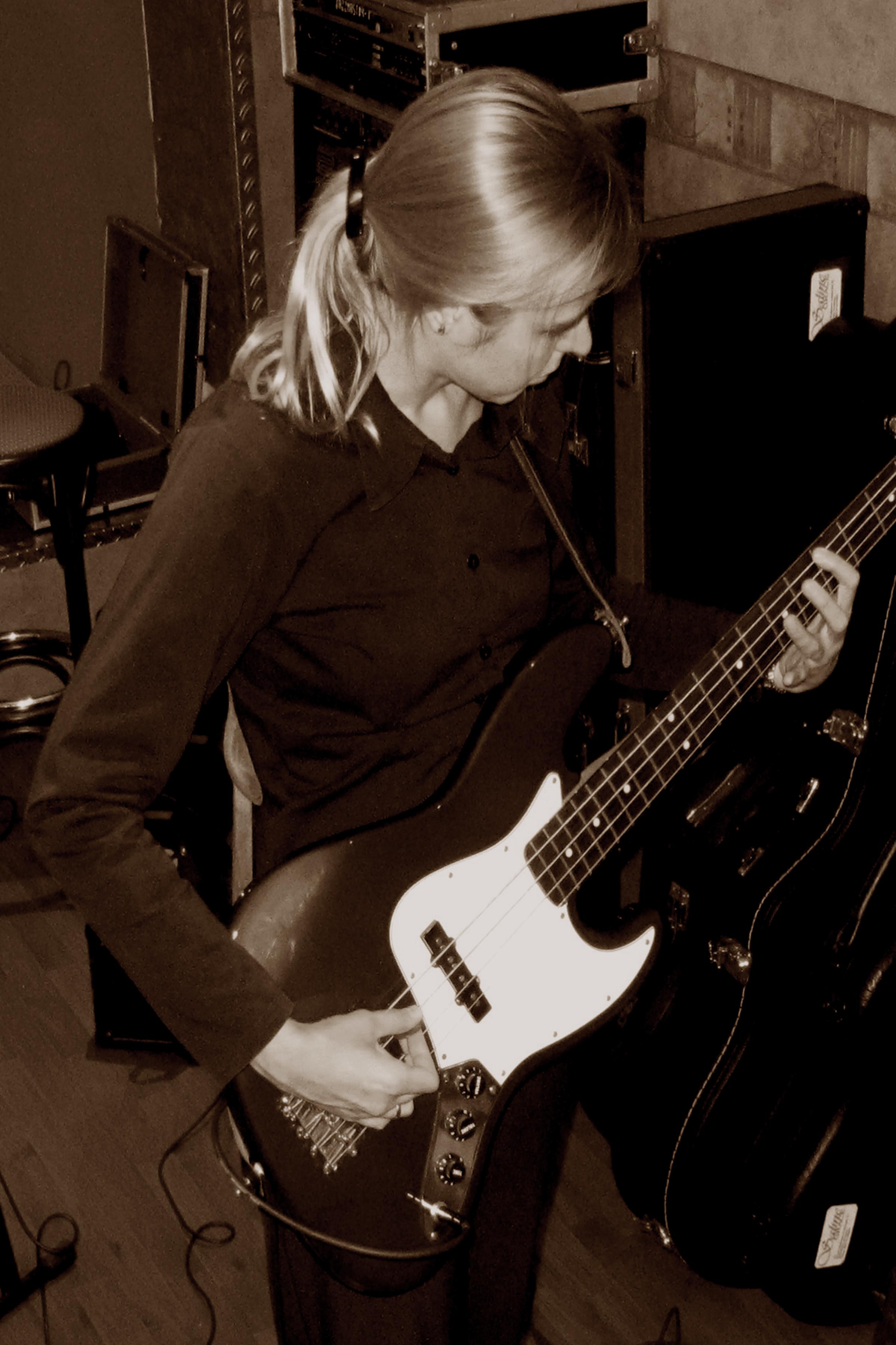
Ines Hoffmann 2010

"In 2011, during the recording and mixing process for a further Saline Grace album, Ricardo Hoffmann made time for a short guest appearance, joining Hamburg-based band Dark Orange on their 2CD album Horizont. Along with Steven Burrows, a member of English cult band And Also The Trees, on bass, Ricardo Hoffmann contributed on additional guitars and piano. Whilst involved in the final work and video shootings for Saline Grace in 2012, he furthermore created his "Rising Stream Mix" of the Dark Orange song "Traumwandler" for Interpretations, the second CD of the same Dark Orange release; other remixes were made by artists like Robin Guthrie of Cocteau Twins, members of And Also The Trees and many more."

=== 2013 up to the present ===
From 2013 onwards, further Saline Grace releases followed. On 21st January 2013 the band with frontman Ricardo Hoffmann released their second album Fog Mountain and four years later Blacksmith’s Fire on 4th September 2017. In 2021, due to the alarming political developments in his home country, Ricardo Hoffmann put out his first release in his national language with Saline Grace's single Der Meister der Intrige and in 2023 the band released the album The Whispering Woods. The latest album The Tree of Knowledge was released on 18th May 2026.

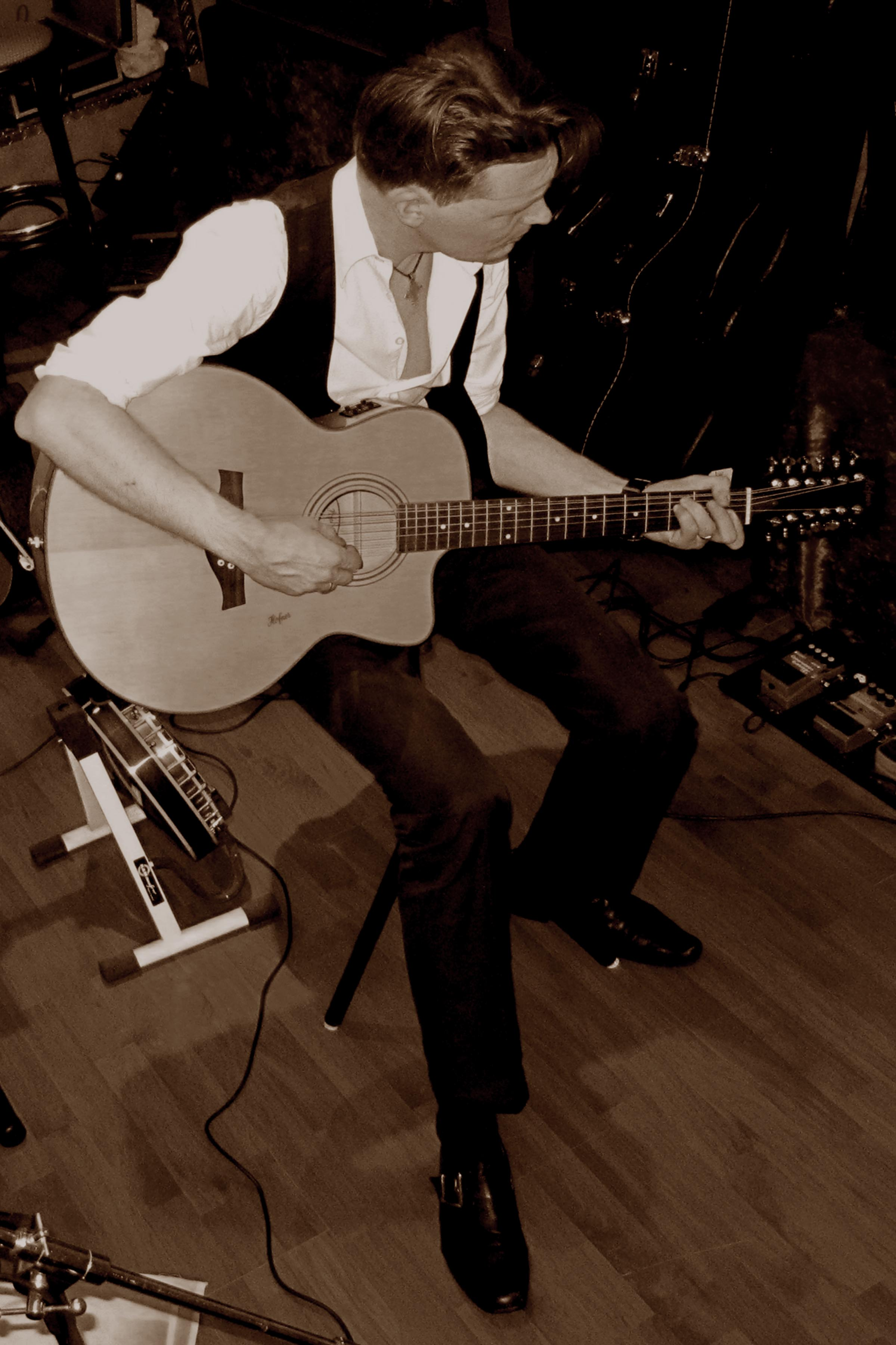
Ricardo Hoffmann 2010

== Band's name ==
The mental nearness to the water, explicitly to the origin of earthly existence - our world’s oceans, was already the idea behind Saline Grace’s precursor, Nobility Of Salt. Thus the common thread was consequently continued. "Tied to that saline grace of a noble but fragile ocean," states Ricardo Hoffmann in 'The Valley' on Saline Grace's debut album‚ Border Town Shades, whereby this line was conducive to finding the band's name.

== Discography ==
=== Studio albums ===
- Border Town Shades (CD 2007/DWRCD03)
- Fog Mountain (CD 2013/DWRCD04)
- Blacksmith's Fire (CD 2017/DWRCD05)
- The Whispering Woods (CD 2023/DWRAL06)
- The Tree of Knowledge (2LP 2026/DWRLP07)

=== Singles ===
- Der Meister der Intrige (Single 2021/DWRSI05)
- The Evening Prayer (Single 2023/DWRSIN06)
- Bar Moon (Single 2023/DWRSIN07)
- Rooms to Let (Single 2026/DWRSIN08)
- Weeping Wounds (Single 2026/DWRSIN09)

=== Projects, Guest Appearances, Books And Compilations ===
- Nobility Of Salt - The Evening Prayer (Demo 1997)
- Nobility Of Salt - Through Clouds And Thoughtful Years (Demo 1998)
- Nobility Of Salt - The Tremulous Sea (first album 2000/DWRCD01)
- Nobility Of Salt - The Silent Ship EP (CDM 2002/DWRCDM01)
- Nobility Of Salt - Those Narrow Streets (CD 2004/DWRCD02)
- Dark Spy Compilation V0l. 17 (CD 2008/Dark Spy Magazine – Issue No. 23)
- Mick Mercer - Music To Die For (Cherry Red Books 2009)
- Dark Orange – Horizont (2CD 2012/Kal41)
- Orkus! Compilation 87 (CD 2013/Orkus! Magazine – Issue No. 03 – March 2013)
- Cold Hands Seduction – Vol. 191 (CD 2017/Sonic Seducer – September 2017)
- Ox Compilation #186 (CD 2026 / Ox-Fanzine #186 03/2026)
