= Teignmouth (album) =

Studio album by Love Is Colder Than Death
- Released: 1991
- Recorded: 1991 at Megasound Tonstudio
- Genre: Dark wave; neoclassical dark wave; gothic rock
- Label: Hyperium, Metropolis
- Producer: Maik Hartung, Ralf Donis, Sven Mertens, Susann Heinrich

Love Is Colder Than Death chronology
Wild World (1991)	Teignmouth (1991)	Mental Traveler (1992)

Teignmouth is the first studio album by the neoclassical dark wave band Love Is Colder Than Death. The album features more gothic rock and electronic music elements compared to their later, more classical albums, and initiated the "Heavenly Voices" series. It was released in Europe in 1991 by the Hyperium music label in both LP and CD formats. Earlier that year Hyperium had released the three song Wild World vinyl EP. Teignmouth was also released in the United States in 1994 by Metropolis Records as the then new record distribution and label's first release (MET001).

Two of the tracks on Teignmouth, "Wild World" and "From the Fog", were previously released on the Wild World EP. However the version of "Wild World" released on Teignmouth is shorter than the original EP release.

== Track listing ==
Both the European and American CD versions of Teignmouth had the same track order.

1. "Tired To Death" – 3:28
2. "Very Ill" – 4:49
3. "Structure" – 1:49
4. "Town E." – 3:08
5. "Questo Mostrarsi" – 2:30
6. "From the Fog" – 2:40
7. "Island" – 3:45
8. "Abiata" – 2:09
9. "For one Ludwig F." – 3:25
10. "Sex and Horror" – 4:25
11. "Chorn" – 3:53
12. "Wild World" – 4:12
13. "Exit Out" – 3:36

The Hyperium Records LP track order is the same as the order on the CD, with the B-side of the album starting with Abiata.

== Credits ==
- Maik Hartung
- Sven Mertens
- Susann Heinrich (vocals)
- Ralf Donis
- Joachim Hofler (recording and mixing)
- Frank Schmmidt (recording and mixing assistant)
- Michel du Chesne and LICTD (cover art)
- William Blake (lyrics on Very Ill)
- George Darley (lyrics on Town E.)
- Toni Zekl (lyrics on For One Ludwig F.)
