= Bigod 20 =

German EBM/techno band

- Also known as: 20; Jalla CX.L2
- Origin: Germany
- Genres: EBM; techno; Industrial
- Years active: 1988–1994
- Labels: Zoth Ommog; Sire/Warner Bro.; ZYX Records; Techno Drome International
- Spinoff of: Umo Detic; Pluuto
- Past members: Andreas Tomalla; Markus Nikolai; Thomas Franzmann

Bigod 20 was a German EBM-techno band which was formed in 1988 by music producers Andreas Tomalla (a.k.a. Talla 2XLC and formerly of the band Moskwa TV) and Markus Nikolai (a.k.a. Jallokin). Nikolai, together with Thomas Franzmann, run the Berlin based Perlon record label.

== History ==
In the late 1980s, Tomalla and Nikolai formed the band Pluuto under Tomalla's own Technodrome Records (TDI Records) label. At the time, Tomalla was also involved in the production of several other projects such as Tribantura and his other collaborations Axodry, Robotiko Rejekto, Moskwa TV, and Microchip League.

In 1988, the duo released their first single as Bigod 20, "America," on the ZYX Records label with a b-side cover of Depeche Mode's "Photographic." That year they also released the single "Body to Body" as part of Tomalla's newly founded Music Research label, which eventually evolved into Zoth Ommog Records.

In 1989, Tomalla and Nikolai formed a new project under the name Umo Detic whose second single, "Carpe Diem", would later be re-envisioned as a Bigod 20 single.

In 1990, Bigod 20 released the single, "The Bog," which became a club hit and resulted in a record deal with Sire Records. The single featured a strong Front 242 influence, due in no small part to having the guest vocal work of Front 242 lead man Jean-Luc De Meyer. Sire Records had originally expressed interest in "Carpe Diem" as a b-side to "The Bog," but later reconsidered and released it as its own single.

After "The Bog," Tomalla and Nikolai sought to add a singer as a full member of the band. They considered Dirk Ivens of industrial band The Klinik but decided that his vocal style was too "hard" for their purposes. On the advice of a friend they contacted and hired musician Thomas Franzmann (a.k.a. Zip Campisi).

The group's first full-length album, Steel Works! was released by Sire Records in 1992. The album included new music such as the single "On the Run," and a version of "America," but did not include many of the band's previously released songs because the rights had been retained by ZYX Records.

While working on the album, the band was inspired to do a cover song to appeal more to an American audience. After some deliberation, Franzmann suggested covering Madonna, which resulted in the electropop-influenced cover of "Like a Prayer." A second album single, "It's Up To You," followed soon afterward.

In 1994, the second full-length album, Supercute, was released along with the single "One". The album took a distinctively different approach to the band's sound, integrating more conventional instrumentation (guitar, jazz organ) and having less emphasis on their previous industrial dance style.

In 1997, Nikolai and Thomas Franzmann (aka Zip) launched Perlon Records, a minimal techno and microhouse label.

== Discography ==
=== Albums ===
- Steel Works! (LP/CD Zoth Ommog - Sire/Warner Bros., 1992)
- Supercute (CD Zoth Ommog - Sire/Warner Bros., 1994)

=== Singles ===
- Body & Energize (12"/MCD TDI/ZYX Records 1988)
- America (12"/MCD TDI/ZYX Records 1988)
- Acid to Body (as "20") (12"/CDS TDI/ZYX Records 1988)
- The Bog (12"/CDS Zoth Ommog - Sire/Warner Bros. 1990)
- Carpe Diem (12"/MCD Sire/Warner Bros. 1991)
- On the Run (12"/CDS Zoth Ommog Records - Sire/Warner Bros. 1992)
- It's Up To You (CDS Zoth Ommog/Semaphore 1993)
- Like a Prayer (CDS Zoth Ommog/Semaphore 1993)
- One (MCD Zoth Ommog - Sire/Warner Bros. 1994)
