= Bioculture (album) =

Studio album by Electro Assassin
- Released: November 1993
- Genre: Industrial; EBM
- Length: 56:13
- Label: Hyperium

Electro Assassin chronology
Jamming the Voice of the Universe (1992)	Bioculture (1993)	The Divine Invasion (1995)

Bioculture is the second studio album by Electro Assassin, released in November 1993 by Hyperium Records. The album was reissued on 16 May 1995 by Metropolis Records for distribution in the United States.

== Reception ==
Professional ratings
Review scores
Source	Rating
AllMusic	2.5/5 stars

AllMusic awarded Bioculture two and a half out of five possible stars. Sonic Boom said "the band has not broken any new musical ground" but "gone are the childishly stupid cyber happy mentalities, the music actually has some semblance of structure." EST criticized the loud production but claimed "Electro Assassin knows what is expected and delivers it with style; EA has taken care with the bass lines and percussion and could teach some of the bigger names a thing or two in the effective use of spoken word samples." The critic went on to say "fans of FLA's Caustic Grip and all that came after it should definitely track Bioculture down."

== Track listing ==
All tracks are written by Kevin Gould, Richard McKinlay and Ian Taylor

No.	Title	Length
1.	"Godfear"	7:17
2.	"Haywire"	5:28
3.	"Toxic Shock"	6:50
4.	"Victim Support"	1:45
5.	"Scum Device"	3:50
6.	"Heavy Unit"	7:20
7.	"F-Zero"	4:24
8.	"Terminal Choice"	6:08
9.	"Ultra Fear"	6:33
10.	"Incubus"	6:38

== Personnel ==
Adapted from the Bioculture liner notes.

Electro Assassin

- Kevin Gould – instruments
- Richard McKinlay – instruments
- Ian Taylor – vocals

== Release history ==
Region	Date	Label	Format	Catalog
Germany	1993	Hyperium	CD	39100692 42
United States	1995	Metropolis	CD	MET 004
