= Love Is Colder Than Death =

Love Is Colder Than Death can refer to:

- Love Is Colder Than Death (film), a 1969 German film
- Love Is Colder Than Death (band), a German band named after the film
