= Jamming the Voice of the Universe =

Studio album by Electro Assassin
- Released: June 1992
- Genre: Industrial; EBM
- Length: 53:00
- Label: Hyperium and Concrete

Electro Assassin chronology
Jamming the Voice of the Universe (1992)	Bioculture (1993)

Jamming the Voice of the Universe is the debut studio album of Electro Assassin, released in June 1992 by Hyperium Records and Concrete Productions.

== Reception ==
Matthew Riley of EST called Jamming the Voice of the Universe "a very cultured "debut" release" and "This new incarnation has a noticeably upbeat, fresh approach to its output."

== Track listing ==
All tracks are written by Kevin Gould, Richard McKinlay and Ian Taylor

No.	Title	Length
1.	"Big Violence" (Convulsion)	7:11
2.	"Righteous Dub"	3:59
3.	"Infect"	4:37
4.	"Turbo FX" (Pro Tec)	4:56
5.	"Lethal One" (VX Edition)	3:53
6.	"No Remorse"	5:33
7.	"Micro Fume (How Dark Is Your Future?)"	4:33
8.	"Anti-Pure" (Global Terraforming)	6:16
9.	"Soul Domination" (Pan Galactic dance Mix)	5:56
10.	"Reinfect"	3:52
11.	"The Demolished Man"	2:14

== Personnel ==
Adapted from the Jamming the Voice of the Universe liner notes.

Electro Assassin

- Kevin Gould – instruments
- Richard McKinlay – instruments
- Ian Taylor – vocals

Production and design

- Van McCoy (Machine) – design

== Release history ==
Region	Date	Label	Format	Catalog
Germany	1992	Hyperium/Concrete	CD	39100192 41/CPROD CD 022
