= Electro Assassin =

English electro-industrial music group

- Also known as: Crisis
- Origin: London, United Kingdom
- Genres: EBM; industrial
- Years active: 1990–1999
- Labels: Cyber-Tec; Hyperium; Synthetic Symphony; Fifth Colvmn; Metropolis
- Spinoff of: Johnson Engineering Co.
- Past members: Kevin Gould; Richard McKinlay; Ian Taylor

Electro Assassin was the music project of London-based composer Kevin Gould, known for his work with Johnson Engineering Co. Ian Taylor provided vocals to the project between 1990 and 1994. The group released three albums: Jamming the Voice of the Universe (1992), Bioculture (1993) and The Divine Invasion (1995).

== History ==
Electro Assassin was founded out of London in 1990 by Kevin Gould as an outlet for his solo compositions. Gould had previously performed in Johnson Engineering Co. Gould joined with Ian Taylor and released Jamming the Voice of the Universe in 1992 by Hyperium Records and Concrete Productions. The second album was released in 1993 by Hyperium and titled Bioculture and represented vocalist Ian Taylor's final release with the band.

The band's third album, titled The Divine Invasion, was released in 1995 by Synthetic Symphony and Cyber-Tec Records and introduced Richard McKinley as the band's new vocalist. In September of that year the album was reissued in the United States by Fifth Colvmn Records.

Kevin Gould now releases material under Nexus Project via Rebel Scum Productions on Bandcamp.

== Discography ==
Studio albums

- Jamming the Voice of the Universe (1992, Hyperium/Concrete)
- Bioculture (1993, Hyperium, Metropolis Records)
- The Divine Invasion (1995, Synthetic Symphony/Cyber-Tec, Fifth Colvmn Records)

Compilation appearances

- FMCD Volume 8 - April 1994 (1994, Future Music)
- Hy! ...To Hypersonic (The Hyperium Compilation | Part II) (1992, Hyperium)
- Hyperium Promo-Sampler (1992, Hyperium)
- Hy! From Hypnotic to Hypersonic (1992, Hyperium)
- Electronic Youth Vol.1 (1993, Music Research)
- Funky Alternatives Seven (1993, Concrete)
- The Digital Space Between Vol. 2 (1995, Cleopatra)
- Cyber-Tec America (1995, Invisible)
- Untitled (1996, Infected, Cyber-Tec)
- Industrial Virus (1997, Dressed to Kill)
- Industrial Hazard (1998, Dressed to Kill)
- Industrial Armageddon (1998, Age of Panik)
- Sacrilege: A Tribute to Front 242 (1999, Cleopatra)
- Industrial Meltdown (1999, Cleopatra)
- Hardware (1999, MCT)
