= Opera Multi Steel =

French minimal synth and coldwave band

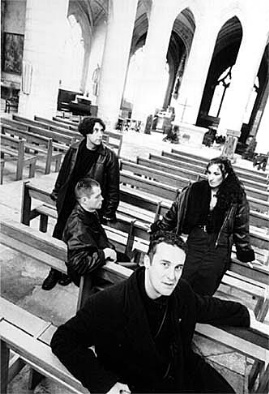
- Bandmembers of Opera Multi Steel. From left to right: Franck Lopez, Eric Milhiet, Patrick L. Robin and Catherine Marie.

Background information
- Also known as: OMS
- Origin: Bourges, France
- Genres: Coldwave, Minimal wave, Synthpop
- Years active: 1983–present
- Labels: Orcadia Machina; Infrastition; Museum Obscuro; Triton, Wave Records
- Members: Franck Lopez; Patrick L. Robin; Catherine Marie; Eric Milhiet
- Past members: Xavier Martin; Jean-Marc Bougain
- Website: opera.multi.steel.pagesperso-orange.fr

Opera Multi Steel, often abbreviated as OMS, is a French minimal synth and coldwave band, originally founded in Bourges in 1983 by Franck Lopez, Patrick L. Robin and Catherine Marie.

The band is now based in Savigny-en-Septaine. Opera Multi Steel is known for its incorporation of medieval and renaissance elements in electronic music, lyrics and album artworks.

== History ==
=== 1982–1990 ===
Opera Multi Steel was founded during the winter 1982-83 in Bourges, France. The original members were Franck Lopez, his brother Patrick L. Robin and Catherine Marie. A four-track EP recorded in 1984 was the first studio recording from the band. The following year, OMS released Cathédrale, a 10-track album dedicated to this gothic building of Bourges. The band gave many concerts and played in several French festivals. It also contributed to many K7 and vinyl compilations on French and European independent labels.

Opera Multi Steel recorded several songs on K7s with lighter sound material. Many of these tracks were never released, or were available as limited editions. Some of them have been rerecorded and rearranged to be included on some official studio albums released later.

Xavier Martin, an electric guitar player, joined the band in 1987 for the studio sessions of Personne ne Dort, a 2-track 45 RPM with a cover designed by the French painter Speedy Graphito. Xavier Martin left the group after one year to pursue his interest in rock music as a drummer.

In 1988, Eric Milhiet, who had played with Franck in other bands before, joined Opera Multi Steel for the recording sessions of the 8-track album A Contresens.

=== 1990–2000 ===
Les Douleurs de l’Ennui, an 11-track album, was released in 1990. The cover shows a painted photograph representing a female medieval knight, made up by Pierre et Gilles, designers from Paris.

Jean-Marc Bougain first appeared as digital percussionist on this record, and joined the band for stage performances as well.

The band's 17-track album Stella Obscura took the whole 1991 to be recorded and was released the year after. Patrick L.Robin, the band's lead singer, suffering from schizophrenia, was hospitalized for some time shortly after its release, because of several suicide attempts. Then the band stopped his activities.

In 1995, the Brazilian independent label Museum Obscuro, division of Cri du Chat Disques, released an OMS compilation called Days of Creation, presenting a selection of songsfrom the ten first years of the band. Some of those recordings had become popular at São Paulo gothic dance clubs. In 1997 the label then issued a brand new 14-track album called Histoires de France, which included lyrics that Robin wrote during his convalescence. Later that year, Franck, Catherine and Eric, with support from Carine Grieg (Collection d’Arnell Andréa), came to Brazil for two concerts, playing musics from their recent and new albums.

In 1998, the band recorded 11 tracks for a new album, titled Eternelle Tourmente, at "Studio du Rempart de la Miséricorde" in Dijon, France. Four of these tracks were new versions of very old songs from limited edition K7 tapes, and seven were new compositions. Most lyrics were written by Patrick L.Robin, but Pauvre Sens et pauvre mémoire was composed on a text by the medieval French poet Rutebeuf and Tristesse on lyrics by the French realistic poetress Marie Mareau. The artwork shows Wounded Angel (1903), a picture by the Finnish painter Hugo Simberg. The album includes folk, medieval music, synthpop, darkwave and coldwave music, and includes vocals by Carine Grieg. Eternelle Tourmente was released by the German label Triton in May 1999.

In August 2000, the CD re-edition of the whole OMS previous discography was completed with A Contresens.

=== 2000–2010 ===
In 2001, the musicians began to work on a new album, Une Idylle en Péril, released in 2003 byTriton. On some of the songs may be noticed additional performances by Carine Grieg (vocals) and Thibault d'Abboville (viola), both CdAA members. The album contains folk music with mandolas, guitars, flutes, mixed with samples from Medieval and Renaissance classic composers. The artwork, an angel helping two young people to cross railtracks, was created by Reno. In 2005 and 2006, several songs, including Un Froid seul and Du son des Cloches were included on French CD and DVD compilations.

OMS stopped recording albums in 2002. During this pause, they involved themselves in another project called "O Quam Tristis..." After an eight-year break, and after the release of a double compilation Parachèvement de l'Esquisse (2008) on the Brazilian label Wave Records, the group returns in 2010 with a new album entitled La Légende dorée produced by Wave Records.The album's title was inspired by a book written by Jacques de Voragine between 1261 and 1266. The same year, Opera Multi Steel contributed to the compilation "30 Years with(out) Ian Curtis" initiated by the French label Infrastition. For this posthumous tribute to Joy Division, the group performed a cover of the title "Isolation", translated into French for this special occasion.

Meanwhile, some of their material was re-issued on various formats. In September 2007, Infrastition released the second CD re-edition of the 1985 Cathédrale, including the four tracks of the first EP of the band, and some period videos. In 2008, the OMS track Là où l’Homme trépasse, from the album Eternelle Tourmente, was included on the compilation Ruines et Vanités, released by the French Magazine "Trinity" to celebrate its 10th birthday.

In September 2008, the German label Vinyl-on-Demand issued a three LP Box set called OMS K7 Tapes Archives MCMLXXXIII-MCMLXXXVI, an anthology of 36 tracks from 1980s OMS K7 tapes, including some unreleased demos.

The song lls s’eloignent was included in the 2010 compilation album Cold Waves and Minimal Electronics Vol.1.

=== 2010–Present ===
After concerts in Brazil in April 2011, the group performed again in Europe, at the Wave Gotik Treffen in Leipzig in May 2012. Finally, Opéra Multi Steel, which had not given any concert in Bourges, his hometown, for over twenty- five years, performed at the Théâtre de Verdure in the Jardin des Prés-Fichaux on July 26, 2012 for a show entitled Éternelle Tourmente in tribute to the bas-relief by the French sculptor Vital Coulhon (1871-1914), which adorns one of the basins of the park.

In 2013 the album Mélancolie en prose is released . It is composed with one half of new titles and the other half with new versions of songs that were originally released on very limites edition K7 tapes in the early days of the group. A clip on the title Mauvais Œil directed by Alan Cassiano, a Brazilian artist, based on images by the French painter Étienne Azambre accompanies this release. In its limited collector's edition, this new album comes with a translucent LP titled Cathedral MMXIII, featuring three completely redesigned standards of the band, including two versions of Cathedral (one in French, the other in Portuguese), as well as Forme et Reforme and Jardin botanique

Apparences de l'Invisible, the band's tenth album, is released as vinyl in April 2014. This is the first studio album since Les Douleurs de l'Ennui to be released on this format. It is produced by the French label Meidosem Records and includes eight new titles. Dotted with quotes to the sacred vocal music and situationist sounds, its atmospheres revisit different eras and inclinations of the band : cold wave (Presqu'Imparfait du Suggestif), Folk (Circonstancielle Défiance) or pop (Ad nauseam, Infini sidéral ...)

In 2015, Opéra Multi Steel pays tribute to the French singer Étienne Daho on the Pistes Noires compilation issued on the Boredom Product French label. The band takes up in its own style the song Bleu comme toi. Once again solicited by Boredom Product, the band takes over Martin Dupont's Inside Out on the Broken Memory compilation, a tribute to this French cult band from the eighties.

Réminiscences, released at the end of 2017, is a collection of eight Opera Multi Steel "standards" taken from various albums and revisited by the members of the band in a more punchy perspective than the original versions. You can hear Cathedrale, Du son des Cloches, Les Sens, Fureur en Asie ... The clip directed by Alan Cassiano on the title Les Sens is a retrospective of the various sleeves and booklets of Opera Multi Steel recordings since their very first 4-track EP published in 1984. The Perspectives by

Jan Vredeman de Vries which had been used on this first opus are particularly in the spotlight in this video which uses them as a main backdrop.

== Side-projects ==
Between 1994 and 1997, Patrick L. Robin performed as singer in the electro-indus project Afghanistan created by Philippe Chasset (Bela Luna). The duet recorded as limited editions twoK7's : Autodafé, Vox Europa and two cds : Gods and Prothesis, Sects and Sex.

From 2000 to 2008, the Opera Multi Steel members, with the help of Carine Grieg (Collection d'Arnell-Andréa, Anna's Tree), gathered themselves under pseudonyms on another project : "O Quam Tristis ...", an electro-medieval-heavenly formation. Four albums were recorded : Funérailles des Petits Enfants (2000), Le Rituel sacré (2002), Méditations Ultimes (2005), Les Chants funestes (2008) both released on Palace of Worms, an Italian label.

In 2001 Franck Lopez, under the pseudonym of Hugues Dammarie lent his voice and played flutes on the second album (Never again will I dream...) of the Dark ambient project Bleeding Like Mine created by Curt Emmer based in Milwaukee.

Franck Lopez and Eric Milhiet (OMS), under the pseudonyms of Hugues Dammarie and Emeric Lenotz worked as a duet for Palace of Worms. This project called Thy Violent Vanities recorded a unique album entitled Come to Dust (2004) with extra performances by Liesbeth Houdijk (voices) and Pierre-Yves Lebeau (guitars and voices) from the Dutch-French group Hide and Seek.

Since 1991, under the pseudonym of Franz Torres-Quevedo, Franck Lopez performs as a bassist-guitarist-vocalist in the French coldwave ensemble Collection d'Arnell-Andréa. He took part to the recording of eight studio albums : Les Marronniers (1992), Villers-aux -Vents (1994), Cirse des champs (1996), Tristesse des Mânes (2002), The Bower of Despair (2004), Exposition (2007), Live à la Nuit des Fées (2008) and Vernes-Monde (2010).

Franck Lopez is also the lead singer of the French-Brazilian electro-pop band 3 Cold Men together with Alex Twin and Maurizio Bonito. The trio has recorded three studio albums : The Three Cold Men (2004), Photogramm (2008), A Cold Decade (2012) and a remix CD Urban RMXS (2005).

In 2007, after many years, Franck met again Lionel Baillemont, one of the founding members of his very first folk band Avaric, for a project called The Crimson Trinity. This band recorded two eponymous albums in 2007 and 2012.

On the same year Franck performed as singer/guitarist on two songs (Memorial, Love and Faith) of the album Roses, Sorrow and Red candies from the German band Bastards of Love, a Tobi Margaux project.

In 2010, for the 30th anniversary of the founding of Avaric, Lionel Baillemont and Franck Lopez re-recorded and rearranged a selection of fifteen titles selected among the band's four albums released at the time. This compilation, simply titled Avaric, came out as a 60-page cd book illustrated with numerous period photographs, interviews and various archives.

Together with Catherine Marie (OMS), Franck Lopez met again Liesbeth Houdijk and Pierre-Yves Lebeau (Hide and Seek) for a new project called Tiramist. The quartet gave birth to a debut album entitled For Your Ears Only, sophisticated pop on surrealistic lyrics, released in 2016 on Wave Records.

With Curt Emmer (Bleeding Like Mine), Franck released in 2017 a 15-track album under the name of Seven Sobs of a Sorrowful Soul. The musical orientation is dark folk ambient based on repetitive sequences of piano / synth / rhythms. The melodies support texts by English authors from the 16th and 17th centuries.

Also in 2017, Franck Lopez performed as bass player on the two titles of a single from the German-Brazilian band Wintry created by Alex Twin (3 Cold Men, Pecadores...) and the singer Anne Goldacker (ex Obsyre). This single, released by Wave Records and titled Ausweg, is produced by John Fryer.

== Band members ==
=== Current members ===
- Franck Lopez : lead and backing vocals, keyboards, guitars, bass, recorders, percussions, (1983–present)
- Patrick L. Robin : lead and backing vocals (main), keyboards, recorders, percussions (1983–present)
- Catherine Marie : Keyboards, rhythm programming, backing vocals, voices (1983–present)
- Eric Milhiet : keyboards, bass, guitars, flute (1988–present)

=== Former members ===
- Xavier Martin – electric guitar (1987-1988)
- Jean-Marc Bougain – drums and percussions (1990-1992)

== Recordings ==
=== Studio albums ===
- Cathédrale (1985) LP - Orcadia Machina
- A Contresens (1988) LP - Orcadia Machina
- Les Douleurs de L'Ennui (1990) LP - Orcadia Machina
- Stella Obscura (1992) CD - Orcadia Machina
- Histoires de France (1996) CD - Museum Obscuro
- Eternelle Tourmente (1999) CD -Triton
- Une Idylle en péril (2003) CD - Triton
- La Légende dorée (2010) CD - Wave Records
- Mélancolie en prose (2013) CD - Wave Records
- Apparences de l'Invisible (2014) LP - Meidosem Records
- Au Fief des Rémanences (2018) LP - Meidosem Records
- Apparences de l'Invisible + Au Fief des Rémanences (2018) Double CD Meidosem Records

=== K7s ===
- Autres Appels (1985) Orcadia Machina
- Eternelle Tourmente (1986) Orcadia Machina
- Opera Multi Steel & Modern Art (1987) Split tape - Orcadia Machina
- Je regarde la pluie (1987) Orcadia Machina
- Regret qui s'écaille (1987) Orcadia Machina
- OMS in concert (1987) Orcadia Machina

=== EPs and singles ===
- Eponymous (1984) 4-track Ep - Orcadia Machina
- Personne ne dort (1987) 2-track 45 rpm - Orcadia Machina
- Les Martyrs (1991) 4 track-Mini cd Premonition
- Cathédrale MMXIII (2013) 4-track Ep - Wave Records

=== Compilations ===
- O.M.S. / Compilation (1987) K7 IRRE Tapes
- Opera Multi Steel January 1989 (1989) K7- Rain Tapes
- Figures de style (1989) K7- EEtapes
- Jardin botanique (1989) K7- NG Medien
- Days of Creation (1995) CD Museum Obscuro
- Parachèvement de l´Esquisse (2008) 2 CDs - Wave Records
- K7 Tapes Archives MCMLXXXIII-MCMLXXXVII (2008) 3 LPs -Vinyl on Demand
- Réminiscences (2017) Compilations of 8 revisited tracks - LP Picture disc - Wave Records
- Réminiscences (2018) 8 + 7 revisited tracks - CD - Wave Records

=== Reeditions ===
- Cathédrale (1997) Album + Eponymous EP - reedition as CD (Orcadia Machina / Lullaby Records)
- Les Douleurs de l'ennui (1998) reedition as CD (Orcadia Machina / Lullaby Records)
- Cathédrale (2007) Album + Eponymous EP + Period videos - 2nd reedition as CD (Infrastition)
- Histoires de France (2011) Reedition 2CDs - Album + original demos (Infrastition)
- Opéra Multi Steel eponymous Ep (2014) reedition as vinyl (Dark Entries Records)

=== Contributions to compilations ===
- International Sound Communication - Vol 7 (1985) Man's Hate Production K7
- Felix qui rerum cognoscere causas - Belial Tapes K7
- Opere senza ombre - Dopo N°12 - Megamagomusic K7
- Dejad que los ninos (1986) 3EM Producciones K7
- To Post a Tape - Vol 2 (1986) Fraction Studio K7
- Grenouille (1987) Organic K7
- Andreas N°5- Not apartheid (1987) Fraction Studio K7
- Passions organiques - Vol 4 "Songs" (1987) A.P.E.A.C K7
- En travers de la gorge (1987) Psychodélires K7
- The Unknown Two Rain Tapes K7
- The Unknown Three (1986) Rain Tapes K7
- No Pop? Ooch Pop ! Vol 1 - Hund Fass K7
- Rythmetic (1986) Fusion D.E Producciones K7
- Stigmata Tapes N°1 (1986) Stigmata Tapes K7
- Dépendance binaire - Garde au sol production K7
- Insane Music for Insane People - Vol 9 (1986) Insane Music K7
- Life, the Underground and Everything - Music and Elsewhere K7
- The Unknown Four (1987) Rain Tapes K7
- Orcades Machinales Vol 1 et 2 (1988) Orcadia Machina K7
- The Unknown Six (1988) Rain Tapes K7
- Nimramicha (1988) Aruru K7
- Orcades machinales - Vol 3 & 4 (1989) Orcadia Machina K7
- Night and Day dreams (1989) IRRE Tapes K7
- Color Pop Explosion (1989) Color Disc K7
- The Unknown Seven (1989) Rain Tapes K7
- And the Trees Are Waiting / Und die baüme die warten (1990) NG Medien K7
- Icare (1990) Orcadia Machina K7
- Mail Compilation Project (1990) Hahamandad K7
- Neue Muster - Vol.7 (1990) Tonspur Tapes K7
- Individual Pop (1990) Claus Korn K7
- The Great "We Love the Beetles" Swindle (1991) K7
- Quatrième communion (1992) Orcadia Machina K7
- Beaucoup (1992) V.I.S.A CD
- Isis (1993) Les Ateliers du son K7
- Neue Muster - Vol.10 (1993) Tonspur Tapes K7
- Black Sundays - Vol 1 (1993) GP Records LP
- Isis (1993) K7
- Secreto Metro (1993) A Contresens K7
- Andreas N°9 (1994) Fraction Studio K7
- Fraction Studio Promo N°1- (1995) Fraction Studio K7
- Instants ardents (1996) Les Variations ludiques CD
- Black Sundays - Vol. 2 (1997) CD
- Taste This 7 (1997) Discordia CD
- Instants sacrés / Instants damnés (1999) Euterpe Production CD
- Storm the Palace : Worms A.D . MCXVII (1999) Palace of Worms Records CD
- Triton Compilation II (2000) Triton CD
- The Power of a New Aeon (2000) Palace of Worms Records CD
- Triton Compilation III (2002) Triton CD
- Transmission 81-89 The French Cold Wave (2005) Infrastition CD
- RVB~Transfert (2006) Optical Sound CD
- Movement One - Vol 1 (2006) Str8line Records CD
- 15 (2006) Infrastition CD
- Wave Klassix - Vol 1 (2007) Wave Records CD
- Ruines & Vanités (2008) Trinity CD
- Cold Wave and Minimal Electronics - Vol 1 (2009) Angular Recording Corporation CD LP
- Wave Records Sampler(2009) Wave Records CD
- 30 Years With(out) Ian Curtis (2010) Infrastition CD
- Beyond the Frontiers (2011) S.A.D.E CD
- Dark Summer-Die highlights von Wave Gotik Treffen (2012) Zillo DVD
- 80's Compilation EP French Side (2013) EE Tapes EP
- Gothic Visions - Vol 5 (2014) Orkus DVD
- Pistes noires (2015) Boredom product CD
- Broken Memory (2017) Boredom product K7
