= Azambre =

Azambre is a surname. Notable people with the surname include:

- Étienne Azambre, French painter
- Stéphane Azambre (born 1969), French cross-country skier
