= The Divine Invasion (album) =

Studio album by Electro Assassin
- Released: September 26, 1995
- Genre: Industrial; EBM
- Length: 68:25
- Label: Synthetic Symphony/Cyber-Tec

Electro Assassin chronology
Bioculture (1993)	The Divine Invasion (1995)

The Divine Invasion is the third studio album by Electro Assassin, released on September 26, 1995 by Synthetic Symphony and Cyber-Tec Records.

== Reception ==
Professional ratings
Review scores
Source	Rating
AllMusic	3/5 stars

AllMusic awarded The Divine Invasion three out of five possible stars. Sonic Boom said "the musical growth exhibited by Electro Assassin within the last several years has been nothing less than astonishing" and "They have forsaken the inane samples and pointless lyrics of previous albums and focused their new work entirely on a dark cyberculture concept which has become immensely popular recently."

== Track listing ==
All music is composed by Kevin Gould and Richard McKinlay

No.	Title	Length
1.	"Cyberchrist"	7:51
2.	"Bodyhammer"	6:00
3.	"Shoemaker Levy 9"	3:13
4.	"Dreamweb"	5:50
5.	"Beyond Salvation"	7:34
6.	"Nova Mob"	4:51
7.	"Voyager"	7:08
8.	"A Scanner Darkly"	4:16
9.	"Cybernator"	4:55
10.	"Earthsiege"	3:38
11.	"Total Body"	5:58
12.	"The Divine Invasion"	7:11

== Personnel ==
Adapted from The Divine Invasion liner notes.

Electro Assassin

- Kevin Gould – instruments
- Richard McKinlay – instruments

Production and design

- Stef Michalski (Room237) – cover art, illustrations, design
- Zalman Fishman – executive-production

== Release history ==
Region	Date	Label	Format	Catalog
United States	1995	Synthetic Symphony/Cyber-Tec	CD	SPV 084-61252CD/C-TEC2
United States	1995	Fifth Colvmn	CD	9868-63203
