= In My Rosary =

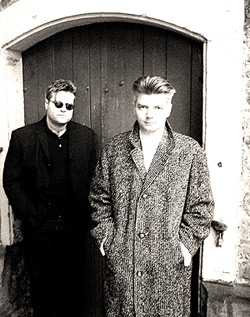
- Dirk Lakomy and Ralf Jesek

Background information
- Origin: Germany
- Genres: Darkwave, Neofolk
- Years active: 1993–2011
- Label: Syborg Music
- Members: Ralf Jesek, Dirk Lakomy

In My Rosary was a German darkwave/neofolk music project with two members, Ralf Jesek and Dirk Lakomy. Though apparently a temporary project, the band has released over a dozen albums since its formation in 1993. Their sound is reminiscent of both acoustic folk music and early gothic rock/new wave, and incorporates electronic elements in varying degrees.

In 2011, Ralf Jesek and Dirk Lakomy went their separate ways. Ralf now continues the style of In My Rosary in the new project I-M-R, with the same live members as before. Dirk makes a more electro style of music with friend Tobias Birkenbeil under the name Lakobeil.

== I-M-R ==
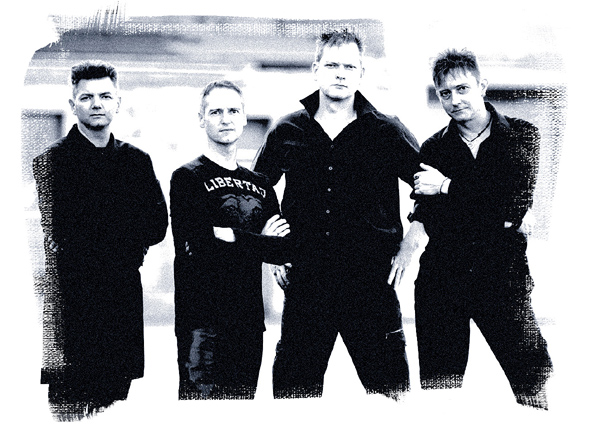
Ralf Jesek, Holger Diener, Martin von Arndt, Hansi Huenig

I-M-R is a German darkwave/neofolk music project, founded 2011 Jesek. After the disbandment of In My Rosary in November 2011, Ralf and his former live guest musicians Martin von Arndt (also member of the avant-garde/industrial band Printed At Bismarck's Death), Holger Diener and Hansi Huenig decided to continue the artistic idea as a band. In November 2012 I-M-R released their debut album "Letters from the Paper Garden", which was supported by some international guests such as Elena Alice Fossi (Italy, Kirlian Camera), Isabelle Dekeyser (Belgium, The Breath Of Life), Stan_I & MS (Russia, Stillife), Sara Noxx (Germany) or Paul Roland (England).

I-M-R, Line-up live at Nocturnal Culture Night 2018 in Deutzen, Germany

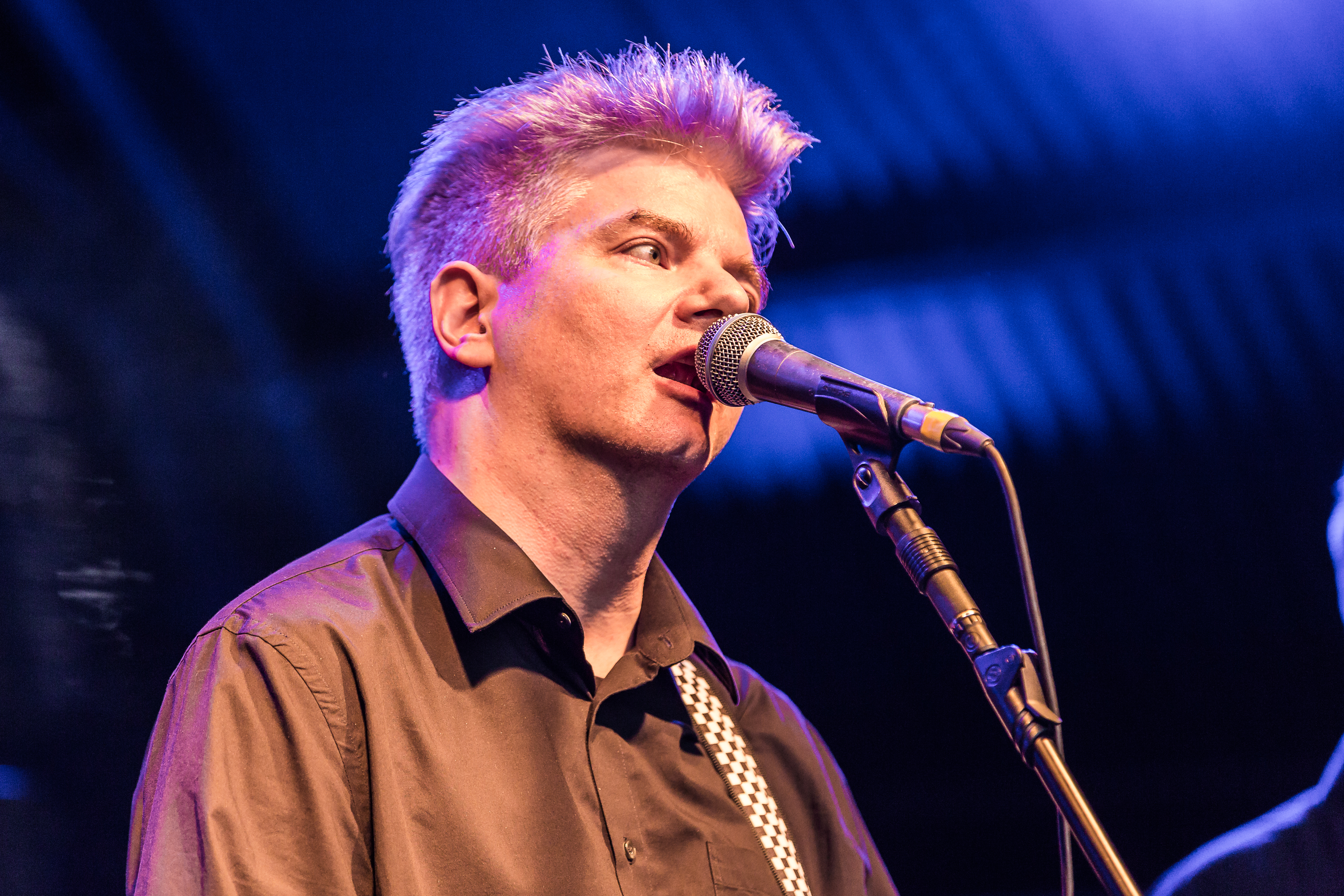
Ralf Jesek

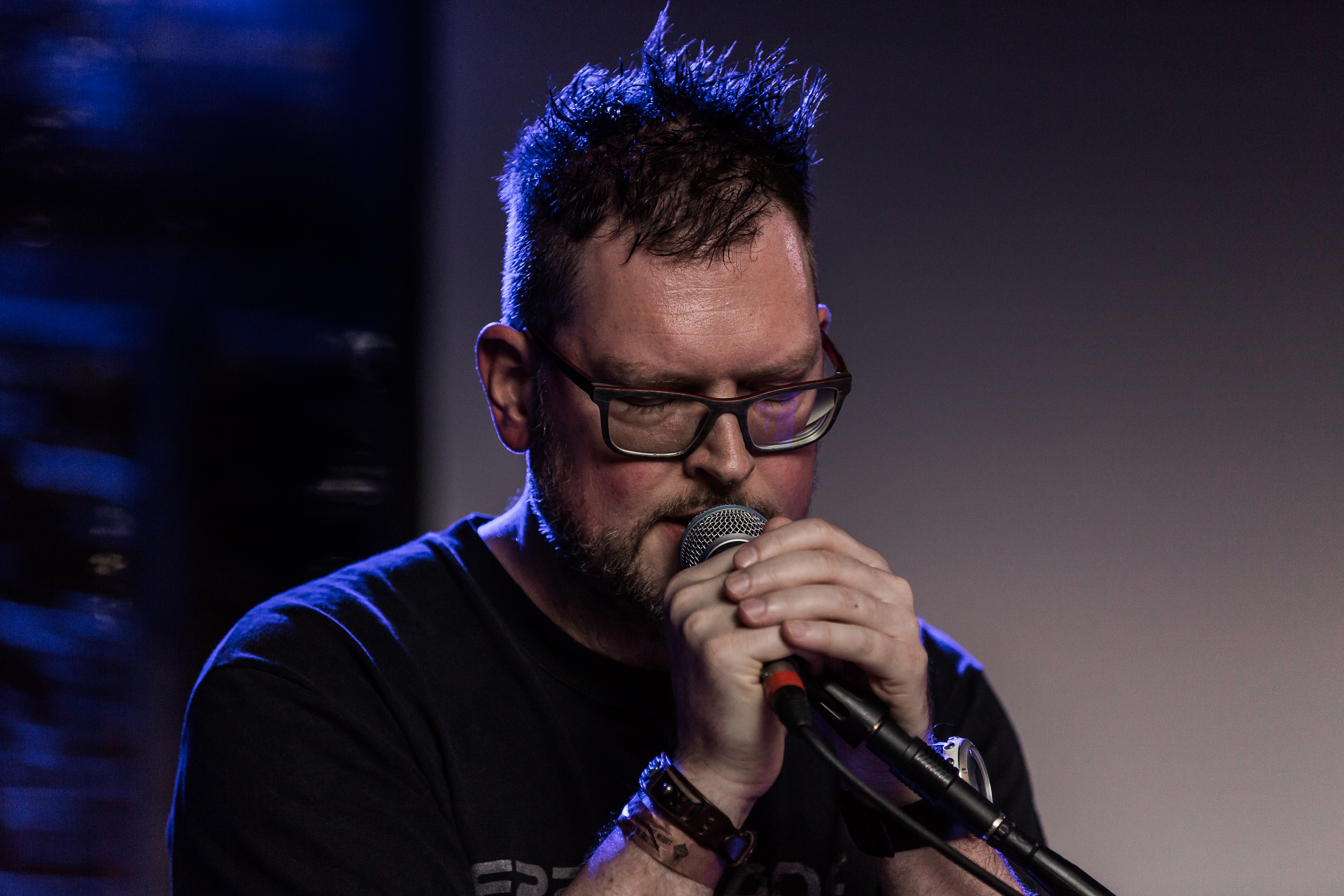
Guy Bannister

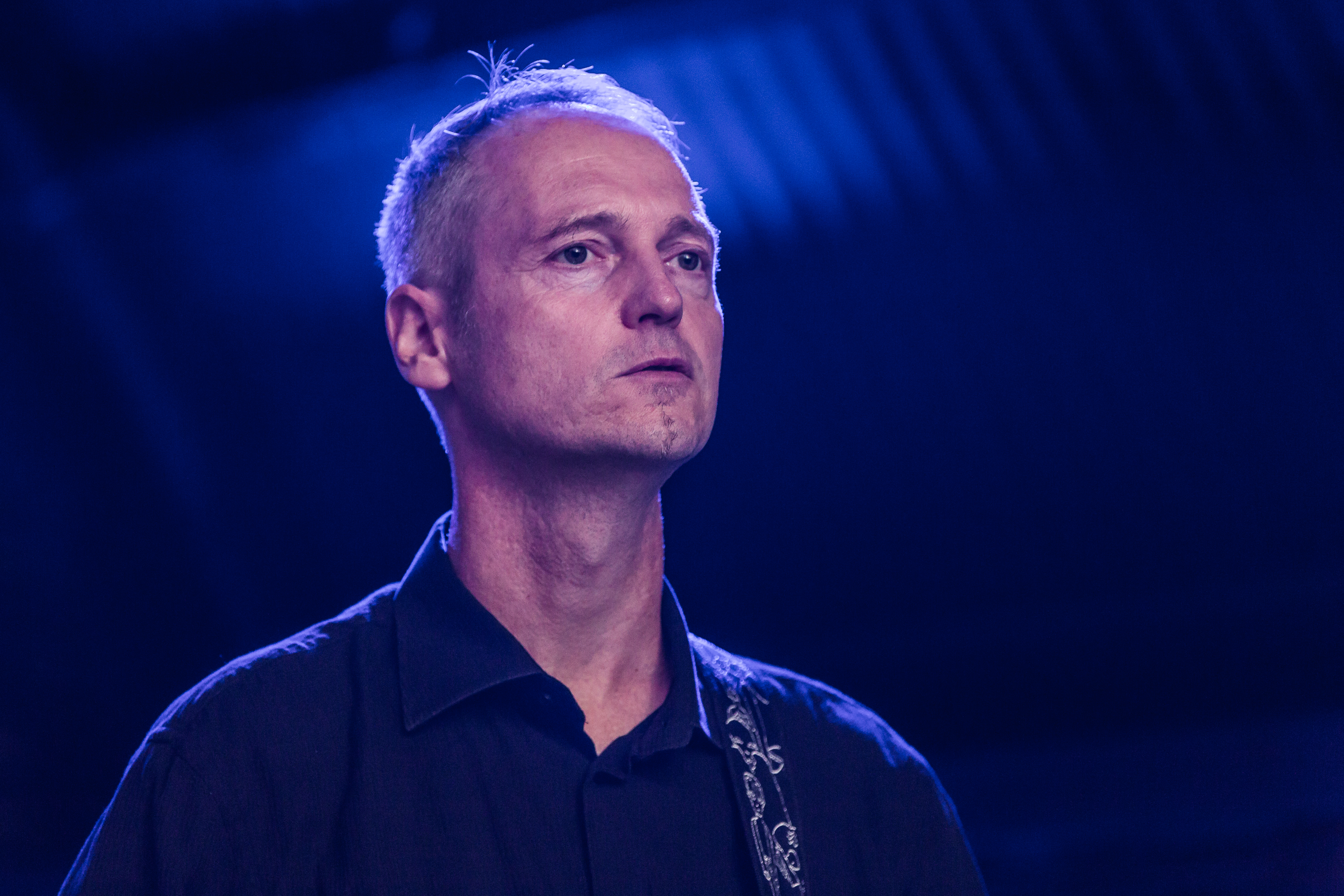
Holger Diener

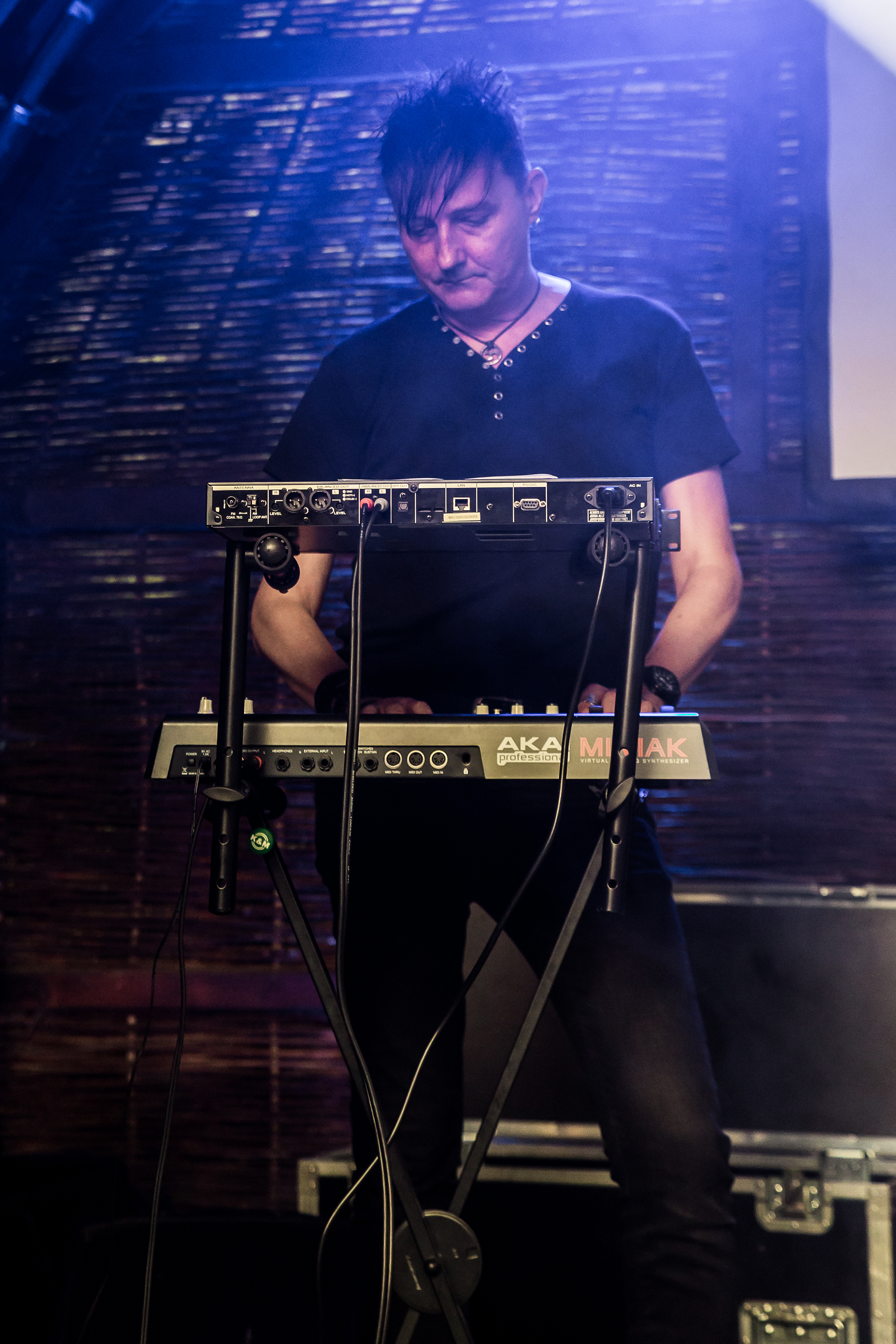
Hansi Huenig

== Discography ==
=== Full-Length Albums ===
- 1993 Those Silent Years (CD)
- 1994 Under the Mask of Stone (CD)
- 1995 Strange EP (CD)
- 1996 Farewell to Nothing (CD)
- 1997 Against the Grain (CD)
- 1999 A Collection of Fading Moments (CD)
- 2002 The Shades of Cats (CD)
- 2004 Greetings From the Past (CD)
- 2004 Your World is a Flower (CD)
- 2007 15 (CD)
- 2010 Retro (CD)

=== As I-M-R ===
Under the Syborg Music label:

- 2012 Letters from the Paper Garden (CD)
- 2014 InOutSide (CD)
- 2017 25-20-15 (CD)
- 2020 Follow The Ruins EP (CD)

=== Associated releases ===
Derrière le Miroir

- 1993 Alibis (CD)
- 1993 Pregnant EP (CD)
- 1994 A Notion of Light (MCD)
- 1995 Deep (CD)
- 1996 Thieves & Kisses (CD)
- 1997 Selected 1992-1995 (CD)
- 2016 In Flux (CD)
- 2016 A Handful of Memories (Vinyl LP)

Mary's Comic

- 2007 - Perfect Vacation (CD)

Printed At Bismarck's Death

- 1986/1993 Fierceness Of The Immortal Charisma (LP/CD)
- 1992 Via Lacrimosa (CD)
- 1993 Ten Movements on the Matrix of a Symbol (CD)
- 1997 Chamber Music for those Absent (CD)

== Bibliography ==
- Nikolaeva, Vanya (11 May 2009). "Artist of the Week - In My Rosary". Public Report. Archived from the original on 11 May 2009.
- "Comment by Ralf". www.inmyrosary.de. Archived from the original on 2 January 2009.
- Van Muylem, Filip (3 March 2012). "I-M-R - interview by Peek-A-Boo magazine". www.peek-a-boo-magazine.be.
