= Chandeen =

- Origin: Frankfurt am Main, Germany
- Genres: Dreampop, Indietronic
- Years active: 1990–2004, 2007–present
- Labels: Hyperium Records; Kalinkaland Records; Synthetic Symfony/SPV

Chandeen (/ʃænˈdiːn/ shan-DEEN) is a musical project from Frankfurt am Main, founded in 1990 and popular in the darkwave scene in the first half of the 1990s. The band refers to its own style as "Electronic poetry". From the middle of the 1990s, the band's style changed to a more pop-oriented sound with influences from rock and trip hop.

== History ==
Chandeen was founded in 1990 by Harald Löwy and Oliver Henkel, who had been working on musical experiments together from the winter of 1989. The name comes from a pet iguana owned by a friend of Löwy. In 1991 Aline Akbari joined, and additional singer Antje Schulz joined in 1992.

After two cassette releases, they came to the attention of Hyperium Records head Oliver Rösch, who signed them. Aline Akbari left the group shortly before the signing and was replaced by Catrin Mallon. Under this lineup they recorded their first two full-lengths, Shaded by the Leaves and Jutland.

In the process of the studio work for Jutland, internal differences arose between the members, and Catrin Mallon and Oliver Henkel left the group in 1994. The pair went on to collaborate on the project Edera, which produced only one album (1996's Ambiguous) before dissolving.

New singer Stephanie Härich joined for the 1995 EP Light Within Time, taking Mallon's place. She had previously worked with Harald Löwy on the project Incept Date, singing background vocals on their Archipelago album in 1994.

After several releases on Hyperium, the group separated from that label and began releasing on Synthetic Symphony, a sublabel of SPV GmbH. Their 1998 single "Skywalking" was broadcast on MTV Europe and VIVA, and the band made appearances on NBC Giga, but the exposure did not bring them widespread success.

Harald Löwy created his own independent label, Kalinkaland, in 2001, which became the primary vehicle for the release of Chandeen's music. Several further releases followed before the group broke up. In 2007 Löwy reactivated the project, releasing a new album, Teenage Poetry, in 2008. Julia Beyer joined for this release. Furthermore there was an additional steady band member with Mike Brown, who died in 2012.

2011 saw the release of their album Blood Red Skies, followed by Forever And Ever in 2014. On February 28, 2020, the band released their tenth studio album Mercury Retrograde. In addition to Julia Beyer, Löwy worked on this album with the British singer Holly Henderson, French songwriter Kitty and 16-year-old German artist Odile. The video for the second single Ocean Mind was presented by the US entertainment magazine Billboard.

== Trivia ==
Artists

- Harald Löwy founded a second project Incept Date besides Chandeen with which he released the two albums Archipelago (1994) and Harem (1996). Together with Chandeen guest musician Ion Javelin (former singer of Moskwa TV) Harald Löwy initiated the project Broken Surface. From this collaboration emanated the album Broken Surface and the single Generator X.0.7/8. Additionally Harald Löwy was active for neoclassic formation Stoa, with whose singer Antje Buchheiser he is in a relationship. A long-term friendship also connects him with Steffen Keth, the singer of De/Vision, who also supported Chandeen for live performances.
- Some Chandeen albums were produced by Axel Henninger, who made a name for himself in the German electropop scene as producer for bands like Camouflage (band) and Moskwa TV.
- The album Forever And Ever, released in 2014, was mastered in collaboration with the New Yorker music and mastering studio The Lodge under the direction of Grammy nominee Emily Lazar.
- Besides his commitment for Chandeen, Mike Brown was also the founder and engineer of the synthesizer company Livewire Electronics, whose modules are being used by bands like M83 or Nine Inch Nails.

== Members ==
Current

- Julia Beyer – vocals, songwriting
- Harald Löwy – music, production, songwriting

Former

- Mike Brown – music, production, songwriting (†2012)
- Aline Akbari – vocals, songwriting (1991–93)
- Catrin Mallon – vocals, songwriting (1993–94)
- Stephanie Härich – vocals, songwriting (1995–2002)
- Oliver Henkel – music (1990–2004)
- Antje Schulz – vocals, songwriting (1992–2004)

Collaborators

- Michael Schwalm – management, photography, artwork, production
- Dorothea Hohnstedt – flute
- Ion Javelin – vocals, songwriting
- Harald Gottschalk – guitar
- Florian Walther – guitar
- Axel Henninger – guitar, production
- Antje Buchheiser – programming
- Phillip Ritmannperger – drums (for live performances)
- Steve Roach – remixer (1995)
- Daniel Myer – remixer (1998)
- Steffen Keth – remixer (2002)
- Klive Humberstone – remixer (2002)
- Nigel Humberstone – remixer (2002)
- Anji Bee – vocals, songwriting (2008)

== Discography ==
Albums & EPs

- 1994 - Shaded by the Leaves (CD, Hyperium Records)
- 1995 - Jutland (CD, Hyperium Records)
- 1995 - Light Within Time (EP + CD-ROM Video, Hyperium Records)
- 1996 - The Waking Dream (CD, Hyperium Records)
- 1998 - Spacerider - Love at First Sight (CD, Synthetic Symphony)
- 2002 - Bikes and Pyramids (CD, Kalinkaland Records)
- 2003 - Echoes (CD, Kalinkaland Records)
- 2008 - Teenage Poetry (CD, Kalinkaland Records)
- 2011 - Blood Red Skies (CD, Kalinkaland Records)
- 2014 - Forever And Ever (CD/Vinyl, Kalinkaland Records)
- 2018 - Rogue (EP, Kalinkaland Records)
- 2020 - Mercury Retrograde (CD/Vinyl, Kalinkaland Records)

Singles & Maxis

- 1994 - "Red Letter Days"/":Lumis:" (MCD, Hyperium Records)
- 1995 - "Strawberry Passion" (MCD, Hyperium Records)
- 1996 - "Papillon (It's Easy to Fly)" (MCD, Hyperium Records)
- 1998 - "Spacerider" (MCD, Synthetic Symphony)
- 1999 - "Skywalking" (MCD, Synthetic Symphony)
- 2002 - "My World Depends on You" (MCD, Out Now Records)

Collections

- 1998 - A Taste Like Ginger (CD, Cleopatra Records)
- 2004 - Pandora's Box (CD, Kalinkaland Records)

Demos

- 1992 - The Twilight Crossing - Part I (K7)
- 1993 - The Twilight Crossing - Part II (K7)

Videos

- 1998 - Skywalking (Videoclip)
- 2011 - Shadows Fade (Videoclip)
- 2014 - The Wild Unknown (Videoclip)
- 2015 - Wake Up, Starbuck (Videoclip)
- 2019 - Vanish (Videoclip)
- 2020 - Ocean Mind (Videoclip)
- 2020 - You're In A Trance (Videoclip)
- 2020 - Light (Videoclip)
- 2020 - All Ghosts (Videoclip)
