= Engelsstaub =

German dark wave band

- Origin: Germany
- Genres: Dark wave
- Years active: 1992–present
- Labels: Apollyon
- Members: Silke Hofmann; Janusz Zaremba; Mark Hofmann
- Website: Official website

Engelsstaub (German for "Angel dust") is a German dark wave band, founded in 1992 by Mark Hofmann as a follow-up to his previous band Les Fleurs du Mal.

== Music ==
Engelsstaub's music leans toward the neofolk/neo-medieval end of the gothic spectrum, with stylistic similarities to bands like Ataraxia, The Dreamside and Faith and the Muse.

== Biography ==
Hofmann began the band in 1992 as a solo project, but after releasing the 7" single Unholy was joined by his sister Silke Hofmann and Polish musician Janusz Zaremba, with whom he also co-founded the independent record label Apollyon.

== Discography ==
- Unholy (single) (1992)
- Malleus Maleficarum (1993)
- Ignis Fatuus: Irlichter (1994)
- In Amoris Mortisque (1995) (split CD with Italian neomediaeval band Ataraxia)
- Unholy (EP) (1997)
- Anderswelt (1999)
- Akashic Recordings (2002)
- Anderswelt (dts-CD) (2004)
- Nachtwärts (2011)
- The 4 Horsemen Of The Apocalypse (2015)
- Mater Mortis (2019)

== Band members ==
- Silke Hofmann - vocals
- Janusz Zaremba - guitars/vocals
- Mark Hofmann - programming/guitars/vocals
