= Love Is Colder Than Death (band) =

German neoclassical dark wave band

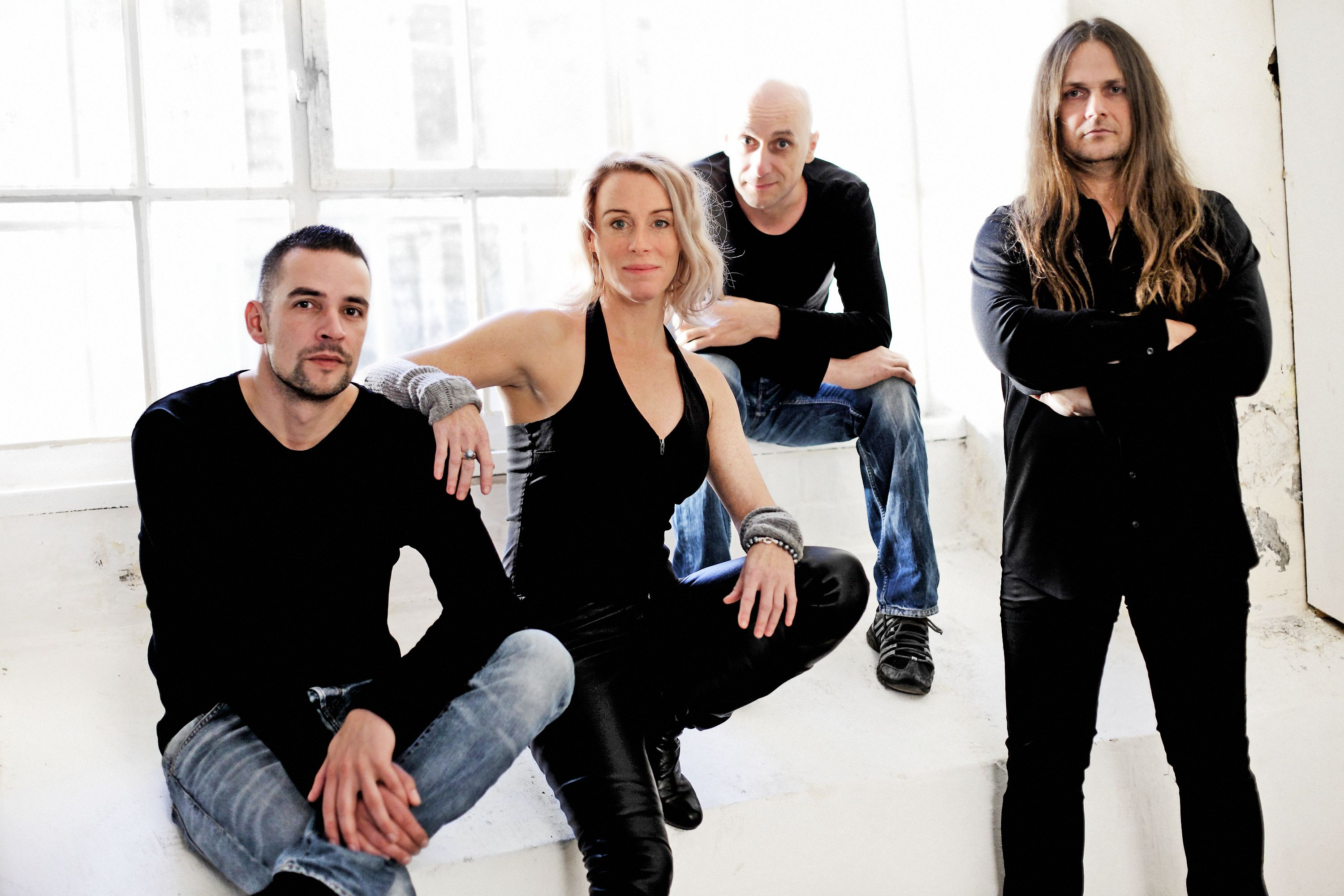
- Love Is Colder Than Death: Ralf, Anja, Maik, Uli

Background information
- Origin: Germany
- Genres: Dark wave; neoclassical dark wave; ethereal wave; neofolk
- Years active: 1990–present
- Labels: In Deyagora Music; Metropolis; San Diego Music; Chrom; Hyperium; Hypnobeat
- Members: Ralf Jehnert; Maik Hartung; Anja Herrmann; Uli Stornowski
- Website: www.lictd.com

Love Is Colder than Death, commonly abbreviated LiCTD or LICTD, is an early German neoclassical dark wave band that was one of the cornerstones to Hyperium Records' Heavenly Voices compilation series of the early 1990s. It is named after the 1969 Fassbinder film Liebe ist kälter als der Tod. The band's music is characterized by its extensive use of both romantic and classical styled male and female vocals. Founded by Ralf Donis, Maik Hartung, Sven Mertens, and Susann Heinrich in 1990, the band members and music have changed slightly since then. The first few LICTD albums were released on the Hyperium record label in Europe and on the new Metropolis Records label in the United States.

The band's album Teignmouth was the first Metropolis Records release, and remains one of LICTD's more popular albums. Following the departure of Donis, the more experimental songs that characterized some of the early LICTD work gave way to a much more classical sound. Eclipse, the latest LICTD album with new content, reached number one on Mexican New Age Sales Charts.

At present, the band is based in Leipzig, Germany. The band performed at major international festivals, including Wave-Gotik-Treffen in 2003 and 2005 and the annual Bach Festival Leipzig in 2003.

== Discography ==
=== Full length albums and EPs ===
- Wild World Hyperium vinyl EP (1991)
- Teignmouth Hyperium Records / Metropolis Records (1991)
- Mental Traveller Hyperium / Metropolis Records (1992)
- Oxeia Hyperium / Metropolis Records (1994)
- Spellbound Hyperium CDS (1995)
- Atopos Chrom (1999)
- Eclipse In Deyagora Music (2003)
- Tempest In Deyagora Music (2013)

=== Special releases ===
- Two Faces But No Guitars (1990) — MC limited to 20 copies
- Auter Hyperium (1995) — collection CD
- Inside the Bell (2004) — live album limited
- Time (2006) 2CD In Deyagora Music—collection CD limited to 1,000 copies

=== Compilation appearances ===
- Romantic Sound Sampler III Zillo (1991)
- Bouquet of Dreams Dark Star (1991)
- From Hypnotic Hyperium (1992)
- Hyperium Promotional Sampler Hyperium (1992)
- Oxeia on Heavenly Voices Part 2 Hyperium (1993)
- Borderline Messerschmitt (1993)
- We Came to Dance Vol. 1 Sub Terranean (1993)
- Art and Dance Vol. 4 Gothic Arts (1993)
- The Fallen Angel Zoth Ommog (1994)
- Affaire de Coeur (1994)
- Heavenly Voices III Hyperium (1995)
- Zauber of Music Vol. II Hyperium (1995)
- Moonraker Vol. II Sub Terranean (1995)
- Electrocity Vol. 6 Ausfahrt (1995)
- German Mystic Sound Sampler Vol. V Zillo (1995)
- Miroque Sub Terranean (1996)
- Touched By The Hand Of Goth Vol. II Sub Terranean (1996)
- The City In the Sea on Goth Box Disk 3 Cleopatra (1996)
- Hyperium New Classics Vol. 1 Hyperium (1997)
- Love and Solitude on The Black Bible 4CD Cleopatra (1998)
- Wild World on Orkus Presents The Best Of The 90s 3 2CD Orkus (2003)

== Band members ==
=== Studio and Live ===
- Ralf Donis (1990–1993) — vocals
- Maik Hartung (1990–present) — strings/percussion/keyboards
- Sven Mertens (1990–1993, 1997–2011) — backing vocals/percussion/keys
- Susann Porter / Heinrich (1990–1995, 2001–2011) — vocals
- Andrew Porter (1993–1995)- drums, vocals
- Manuela Budich (1997–2000) — vocals
- Helen Landen (2000–2001) — vocals (live)
- Ralf Jehnert (1997–present) — vocals
- Anja Herrmann (2012–2013) — Vocals/Percussion
- Justus Kriewald (2010 - 2012) — Keyboards/Backing Vocals/Bass
- Uli Stornowski (2012–2013) — Percussion/Flute/Backing Vocals

=== Live only ===
- Michael Metzler (2003–Present) — also a member of Sarband
- Neil Rupsch (2010-2011) — Drums
- René Bielig (2010-2011) — Guitars/Bass
