= Dark Orange =

German ethereal wave band

- Also known as: 24 Hours
- Genres: Ethereal wave, dream pop
- Years active: 1990–1993, 2008–present
- Labels: Kalinkaland, Hyperium, Deathwish Office
- Members: Katrin Wegener (Voice); Dirk Ritter (Guitar); Michelle (Bass); Olivier Goyet (Keyboards / Programming)
- Past members: Christoph Leffmann (Bass); Malte Neumann (Keyboards); Stephan Böhme (Drums); Andreas (Drums)

Dark Orange is an ethereal wave band from Hamburg, Germany and is probably best known for their gothic rendition of Paul Simon's "Sounds of Silence".

== History ==
Dark Orange's last release with Hyperium Records, "The Sea Is My Soul", taken from their album The Garden of Poseidon, was released under the alias 24 Hours and drastically remixed by Mark Tibenham of And Also the Trees.

The band went relatively unknown to American audiences, until 1998 when Cleopatra Records released "The Sea Is My Soul" (as 24 Hours) on the compilation Heavenly Voices.

Dark Orange announced a reunion in 2008. In 2009, a single followed and the band announced that a new album would be released in May, 2010 on the Kalinkaland label, produced by Folker Alberts and Mastered by Robin Guthrie of the Cocteau Twins. Guest musicians on the album included Steven Burrows (Bass) and Emer Brizzolara (Dulcimer, drums).

== Discography ==
=== Albums and EPs ===
Year	Title	Label
1990	Dahlia	Deathwish Office
1991	Oleander	Hyperium
1993	The Garden of Poseidon	Hyperium
1993	Breathing the Water (Live)	Benton Tapes
2010	Clouds, Paperships and Fallen Angels	Kalinkaland
2012	Horizont	Kalinkaland

=== Singles ===
Year	Song	Chart	Album	Label
1992	"Sounds of Silence"	-	The Garden of Poseidon	Hyperium
1993	"The Sea Is My Soul"	-	The Garden of Poseidon	Hyperium
2009	"Monkey Business"	-	Clouds, Paperships and Fallen Angels	Kalinkaland
2012	"Butterflies"	-	Horizont	Kalinkaland
2012	"Traumwandler"	-	Horizont	Kalinkaland
2012	"Dagger (Special Remix)"	-	Horizont	Self-Release

=== Promotional Music Videos ===
Year	Song
1993	"The Sea Is My Soul"
2009	"Monkey Business"
2012	"Butterflies (Robin Gutherie Mix)"
2012	"Traumwandler"
2016	"Halt Mich Auf"

=== Compilations ===
Year	Title	Label	Song	Additional information
1991	Bouquet of Dreams	Dark Star	"Rose Grower" (from Dahlia)	Release by Dark Star, a sidelabel of Strange Ways.
1998	Heavenly Voices	Cleopatra	"The Sea Is My Soul (Northern Dreamland Mix)"	U.S. release of the European Heavenly Voices compilations.
