= Moskwa TV =

Moskwa TV was a German electronic music group, who were mainly active in the 1980s.

== Biography ==
In the early 1980s, Andreas Tomalla (a.k.a. Talla 2XLC) began his career as a DJ in Frankfurt, and put on preferably Kraftwerk and Depeche Mode. Together with Ralf Henrich (a.k.a. RaHen), he founded the band Moskwa TV, with a very modern techno sound for the time. The ground-breaking debut album Dynamics & Discipline was mainly composed by Talla and RaHen, and produced by Kurt Ader and Axel Henninger / Naskrent in the Dynaton Studio.

Vocalist Ion Javelin (Jan Veil) joined during the production of the debut album at the recommendation of label CBS to the band. At CBS, he had released his first single, "Dancing in Heaven", under the pseudonym Gary Chandler, with little commercial success. RaHen and Javelin together composed the song "Generator 7/8".

The singles "Generator 7/8" and "Tekno Talk" were released and gained popularity in various clubs in the Frankfurt techno scene and then at larger venues.

The release of the second studio album Blue Planet (1987) led to disputes between the band members. Talla 2XLC thought Ion Javelin had too much clout over the band, so he looked for a new singer. However he disliked the candidates and backpedaled, bringing Javelin back to the band. Talla 2XLC then left the band because of disputes with Axel Henninger and Ion Javelin concerning the rights to the band's songs.

In 1988, Axel Henninger left Moskwa TV, due to money disputes about his producer activity with the label Westside. The naming rights remained with Ion Javelin, whose label Westside agreed with Talla 2XLC financially.

Axel Henninger has produced for Camouflage, Paddy Goes to Holyhead, Okay, Deborah Sasson, Chandeen, X-Perience, and De/Vision.

In 2003, Javelin released the album Broken Surface together with Chandeen's Harald Löwy.

== Members ==
- Talla 2XLC (Andreas Tomalla)
- Axel Henninger
- Ion Javelin (Jan Veil)
- RaHen (Ralf Henrich)

== Discography ==
=== Studio albums ===
- 1985: Dynamics & Discipline
- 1987: Blue Planet
- 1991: Javelin
- 1992: Dynamics + Discipline (re-release of the debut album with a slightly different track list)

=== Singles ===
- 1985: "Generator 7/8"
- 1985: "Tekno Talk"
- 1985: "Tekno Talk (Bombing Mix)"
- 1986: "Generator 7/8 (Remix)"
- 1986: "Art of Fashion"
- 1987: "Brave New World"
- 1987: "Moskwa Electronic / Brave New World"
- 1988: "Generator 7/8 – 88"
- 1991: "Tell Me, Tell Me"
