= Étienne Azambre =

French painter (1859–1933)

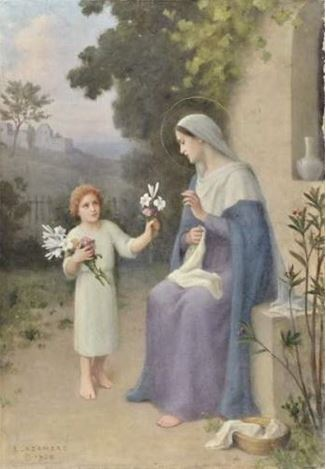
Offering to the Virgin Mary

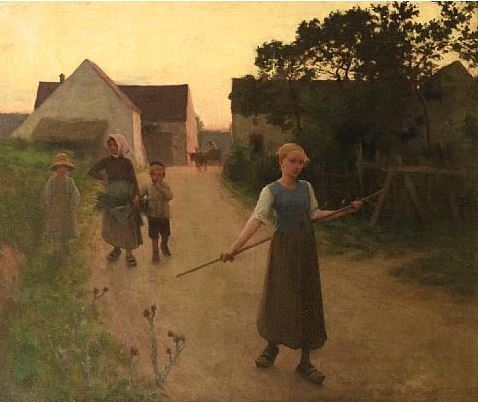
Return from the Fields

Étienne Azambre (2 February 1859 – 21 June 1933) was a French painter, best known for his religious and genre scenes, done in a subdued manner.

== Life & work ==
Azambre was born in Paris. His father was a lawyer. After attending the Collège Stanislas de Paris, he decided to become an artist. From 1879 to 1882, he was enrolled at the Académie Julian, then attended the École Nationale des Beaux-Arts until 1885, where he studied with William Bouguereau and Tony Robert-Fleury. During his military duty in Orléans, he made lifelong friends with the painters Lucien Simon and Georges Desvallières.

Between 1883 and 1904, he exhibited regularly at the Salon des Artistes français In 1889, he participated in the annual exhibition held by the Friends of Art of the Département of Seine-et-Oise, which was held at the Château de Versailles. In 1893, he had a showing at the Musée royal d'Art moderne à Bruxelles.

His religious works could also be seen at several artistic exhibitions organized by the Rosicrucians. Their largest was held in 1893, at the Palais du Champs de Mars, which was demolished in 1988. Many of his works were reproduced as illustrations in magazines such as Le Monde Illustré, La Famille and La France Illustrée.

In 1895, he was one of the artists chosen to decorate the Church of Sainte Marie-Madeleine of Équennes-Éramecourt in Somme. He created frescoes that adorn the cupola, representing the Coronation of the Virgin in the presence of a large assembly of angels. Later, he became a member of the Société de Saint-Jean, where he participated in their exhibitions, held the office of Vice-President for a short time and contributed numerous articles to their magazine, Notes d'Art et d'Archéologie. This helped him establish a relationship with the publisher, Bouasse-Lebel, which specialized in religious items. He eventually provided hundreds of pious images, many for postcards, reproduced by lithography, rotogravure and chromolithography. He focused entirely on scenes from the New Testament.

Between 1916 and 1919, he devoted himself almost exclusively to producing four large frescoes, representing the Nativity and the Assumption, at the Église Saint-Firmin de Senan in Yonne, a village near his family estate. Following his death, in Paris in 1933, he was interred in a nearby cemetery.
