= Dark wave =

Genre of music

- Other names: Doom; doom wave
- Stylistic origins: New wave; post-punk
- Cultural origins: Late 1970s – early 1980s, Europe (particularly in the United Kingdom, West Germany, Belgium, Netherlands, France and Italy)
- Typical instruments: Guitar; bass guitar; drums; drum machine; synthesizer; sampler; violin; cello; piano; percussion

Subgenres
- Cold wave; dark cabaret; ethereal wave; gothic rock; neoclassical dark wave; neofolk; Neue Deutsche Todeskunst

Regional scenes
- France; Germany

Other topics
- Gothic rock

Dark wave (also known as darkwave) is a music genre that emerged from the new wave and post-punk movement of the late 1970s. In the English language, the term generally refers to a specific subgenre of gothic rock that emphasises the sythesiser use of new wave and ambient music and subverts usual rock instrumentation. In the German language, dark wave is not a "unified genre but rather an umbrella term" that encompasses a variety of musical styles, including cold wave, ethereal wave, gothic rock, neoclassical dark wave and neofolk.

Dark wave compositions are largely based on minor key tonality and introspective lyrics and have been perceived as being dark, romantic and bleak, with an undertone of sorrow. Common features include the use of chordophones such as electric and acoustic guitar, violin and piano, as well as electronic instruments such as synthesizer, sampler and drum machine.

In the 1980s, a subculture developed primarily in Europe alongside dark wave music, whose followers were called "wavers" or "dark wavers". In some countries, most notably Germany, the movement also included fans of gothic rock (so-called "trad-goths").

== History ==
=== 1980s: Origins in Europe ===
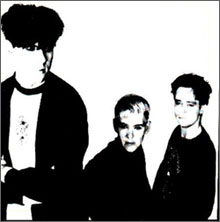
Clan of Xymox

Since the 1980s, the term "dark wave" has been used in Europe by the music press to describe the gloomy and melancholy variant of new wave and post-punk music. At that time, the term "goth" was inseparably connected with gothic rock, whereas "dark wave" acquired a broader meaning, embracing bands and solo artists that were associated with gothic rock and synthesizer-based new wave music, such as Bauhaus, Joy Division, the Cure, Siouxsie and the Banshees, the Sisters of Mercy, Anne Clark, Depeche Mode, Gary Numan and the Chameleons.

The term darkwave originated in the 1980s as an indicator of the dark counterpart of new wave. Bands such as Cocteau Twins, Soft Cell, and Depeche Mode are exponents of this first generation of darkwave. Darkwave... employs relatively slower tempos, lower pitches, and more minor keys in its musical settings of melancholy texts than new wave.

— Isabella van Elferen, Professor of Musicology, Kingston University, London

The movement spread internationally, developing such strands as ethereal wave, with bands such as Cocteau Twins, and neoclassical dark wave, initiated by the music of Dead Can Dance and In the Nursery. French cold wave groups such as Clair Obscur and Opera Multi Steel have also been associated with the dark wave scene; Rémy Lozowski, guitarist of French cold wave band Excès Nocturne, described his music as new wave noire ("dark new wave").

Simultaneously, different substyles associated with the new wave and dark wave movements started to merge and influence each other, e.g. synth-wave (a kind of new wave with synthesizers, also referred to as "electro-wave") with gothic rock, or began to borrow elements of post-industrial music. Attrition, Die Form (France), Pink Industry (UK), Psyche (Canada), Kirlian Camera (Italy) and Clan of Xymox (Netherlands) performed this music in the 1980s. Other bands such as Malaria! and the Vyllies added elements of chanson and cabaret music. This sort of dark wave music became known as cabaret noir (or "dark cabaret", a term popularized by U.S. dark wave label Projekt Records).

German dark wave bands were partially associated with the Neue Deutsche Welle (i.e. German new wave), and included Xmal Deutschland, Mask For, Asmodi Bizarr, II. Invasion, Unlimited Systems, Moloko †, Maerchenbraut, Cyan Revue, Leningrad Sandwich, Stimmen der Stille, Belfegore, and Pink Turns Blue.

=== 1990s: Second generation ===
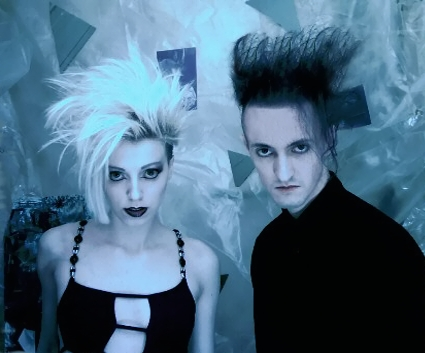
The Frozen Autumn

After the new wave and post-punk movements faded in the mid-1980s, dark wave was renewed as an underground movement by German bands such as Girls Under Glass, Deine Lakaien, Love Like Blood, Love Is Colder Than Death, Diary of Dreams, the Eternal Afflict, and Wolfsheim, as well as Project Pitchfork and its offshoot Aurora Sutra. Ataraxia and the Frozen Autumn from Italy, and the French Corpus Delicti also evolved from this movement and became the leading artists of the west Romanesque dark wave scene. These bands followed a path based on the new wave and post-punk music of the 1980s.

In the 1990s, a second generation of darkwave bands became popular, including Diary of Dreams, Deine Lakaien, and the Frozen Autumn... The German band Deine Lakaien ... is audibly influenced by the dark synthesizer sounds of Depeche Mode.

— Isabella van Elferen, Professor of Musicology

At the same time, a number of German artists, including Das Ich, Goethes Erben, Relatives Menschsein, and Endraum, developed a more theatrical style, interspersed with German poetic, metaphorical lyrics, called Neue Deutsche Todeskunst (literally New German Death Art). Other bands, such as Silke Bischoff, In My Rosary, Engelsstaub, and Impressions of Winter combined synthesizers with elements of neofolk and neoclassical dark wave.

==== United States ====
After 1993, in the United States the term dark wave (as the one-word variant "darkwave") became associated with the Projekt Records label, because it was adopted by label founder Sam Rosenthal after leafing through the pages of German music magazines such as Zillo, and has been used to promote and market artists from German label Hyperium Records in the U.S., e.g. Chandeen and Love Is Colder Than Death.

I first became aware of the term "Dark Wave" back in 1992. It appeared in German magazines – such as Zillo – describing a style of European music that followed other "waves" such as New Wave ... I found those two words ("dark" and "wave") quite interesting. This was something underground, submerged, obscure... which swept over you, immersed you, surrounded you. It was a poetic phrase that could describe many different sounds. At the time, I was looking for a name for my little mail-order company. I wanted something that would encompass the variety of music available in my catalog.

— Sam Rosenthal, Projekt Records, 2000

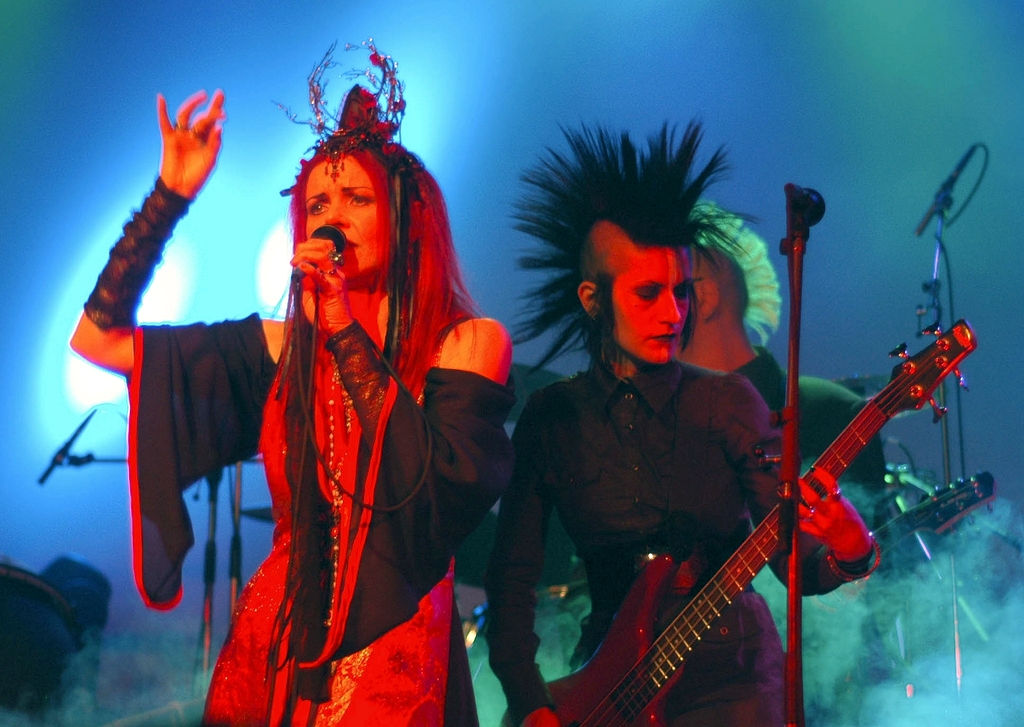
Faith and the Muse (Monica Richards and Marzia Rangel of Christ vs. Warhol and Scarlet's Remains)

Projekt featured bands such as Lycia, Black Tape for a Blue Girl, and Love Spirals Downwards, some of these characterized by atmospheric guitar and synth-sounds and female vocals. This style took cues from 1980s bands like Cocteau Twins and is often referred to as ethereal dark wave. Projekt Records has also had a long association with Attrition, who appeared on the label's earliest compilations. Another American record label in this vein was Tess Records, which featured This Ascension, Faith and the Muse, and the reunited Clan of Xymox.

Joshua Gunn, a professor of communication studies at Louisiana University, described the U.S. type of dark wave music as:

...an expansion of the rather limited gothic repertoire into electronica and, in a way, the US answer to the "ethereal" subgenre that developed in Europe (e.g. Dead Can Dance). Anchored by Sam Rosenthal's now New York-based label Projekt, dark wave music is less rock and more roll, supporting bands who tend to emphasize folk songcraft, hushed vocals, ambient experimentation, and synthesized sounds [...] Projekt bands like Love Spirals Downwards and Lycia are the most popular of this subgenre.

=== 2000s–2020s: Revival ===
During the 2000s, as part of the post-punk revival, a new generation of bands rekindled several sonic characteristics of early dark wave music for a new generation of fans which proliferated into the early 2010s. Some prominent acts include She Wants Revenge, the Soft Moon, She Past Away, Drab Majesty, Twin Tribes, Selofan and Boy Harsher. Alongside Belarusian band Molchat Doma.

Substance is an annual darkwave and industrial music festival occurring in Los Angeles which began in the 2010s. Meanwhile, Verboden is an annual Darkwave festival in Vancouver, British Columbia. The Wave-Gotik-Treffen festival in Leipzig, Germany, established in 1992, is considered one of the world's largest festivals for "dark" music and culture, taking place at Pentecost annually throughout the city. It attracts around 20,000 visitors from all over the world.

== Related genres ==
=== Neoclassical dark wave ===
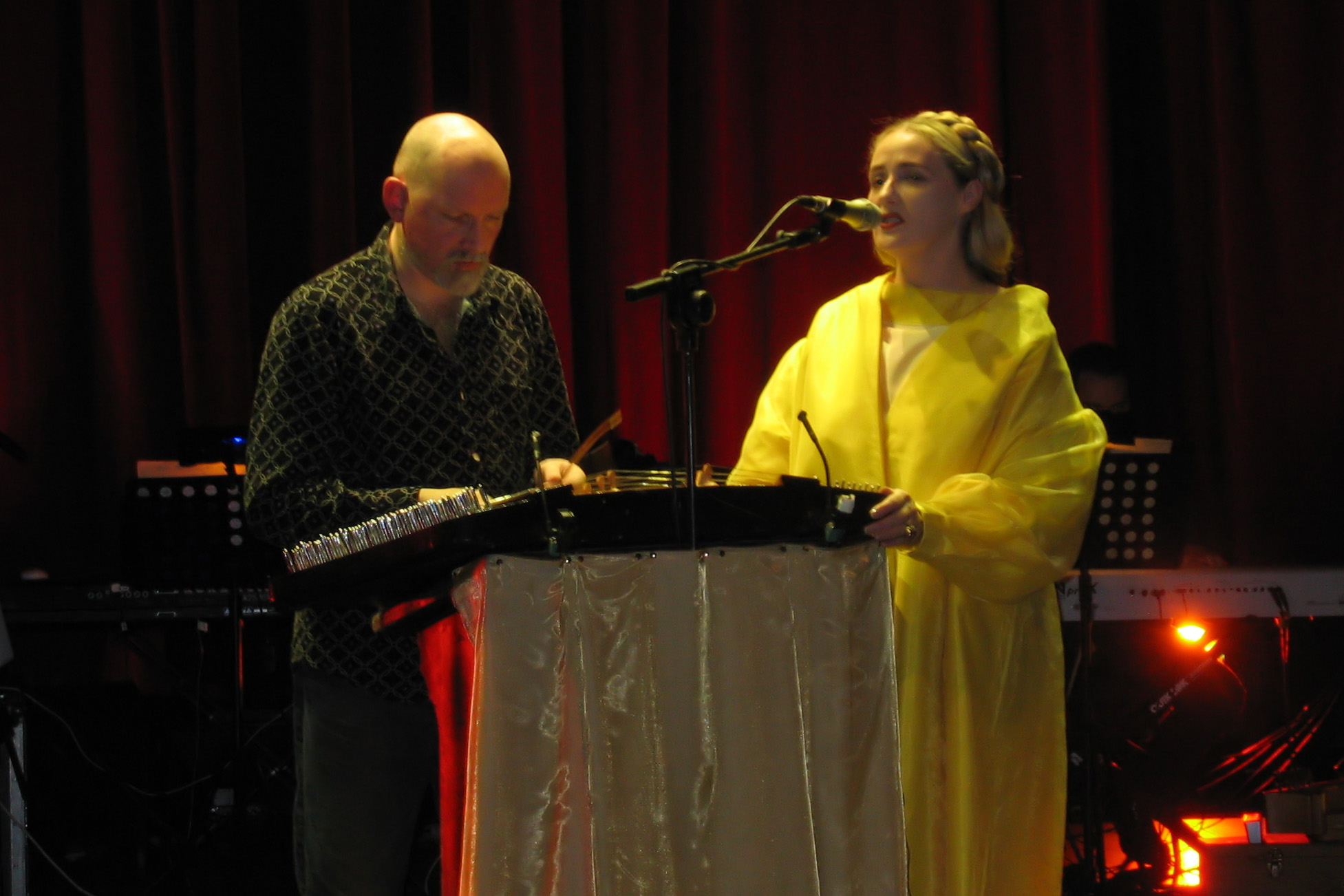
Dead Can Dance (Brendan Perry and Lisa Gerrard)

Neoclassical dark wave is a subgenre of dark wave music that is characterized by incorporating elements of classical music to create an ethereal, dramatic or melancholy atmosphere. Neoclassical dark wave makes extensive use of orchestral components; many bands utilize modern production equipment (orchestra-derived synthesizer samples), while others make use of chamber orchestras and acoustic instruments (e.g. string and brass instruments and orchestral percussion). Vocals in the subgenre can vary; female voices predominate.

In the second half of the 1980s, former post-punk bands such as Dead Can Dance (Within the Realm of a Dying Sun, 1987) and In the Nursery (Stormhorse, 1987) released influential albums which essentially laid the foundations of the genre.

Other artists include Arcana, Ataraxia, Autumn Tears, Camerata Mediolanense, Dargaard, Dark Sanctuary, Impressions of Winter, Les Secrets de Morphée, Lingua Ignota, Love Is Colder Than Death, Miranda Sex Garden, Ophelia's Dream, Stoa, and WeltenBrand.

== Bibliography ==
- Farin, Klaus; Wallraff, Kirsten: Die Gothics. Bad Tölz: Verlag Thomas Tilsner, 1999, ISBN 9783933773098.
- Mercer, Mick. Hex Files: The Goth Bible. New York: The Overlook Press, 1997, ISBN 0-879-51783-2.
- Steinberg, Shirley; Parmar, Priya; Richard, Birgit: Contemporary Youth Culture. An International Encyclopedia. Volume II., Greenwood Publishing Group, 2005, ISBN 0-313-33729-2.
- van Elferen, Isabella; Weinstock, Jeffrey Andrew: Goth Music: From Sound to Subculture. Routledge Studies in Popular Music, 2015, ISBN 0-415-72004-4.
- Hecken, Thomas; Kleiner, Marcus: Handbuch Popkultur, J. B. Metzler Verlag, 2017, ISBN 978-3-476-02677-4.
- Sturman, Janet: The SAGE International Encyclopedia of Music and Culture. SAGE Publications, 2019, ISBN 978-1-50635-338-8.
