= Hyperium Records =

German record label

- Parent company: ZZO Recordings
- Founded: 1991
- Founder: Oliver Roesch / Oliver van Essenberg
- Defunct: 2002
- Genre: darkwave, neoclassical, gothic rock, ambient, ethereal
- Country of origin: Germany
- Location: Nürnberg

Hyperium Records was a German independent record label specializing in darkwave, neoclassical, ethereal, gothic rock, and ambient music, founded by Oliver Roesch (also known as "Oli" Roesch) and Oliver van Essenberg in 1991. Roesch died on August 1, 2002, in a motorcycle accident.

== Releases ==
=== Heavenly Voices compilations ===
Hyperium released a series of Heavenly Voices compilation series, which featured prominent use of female vocals in a neo-classical, neofolk, world music, trip hop or ethereal style. "Heavenly Voices" has often been used as a genre term, particularly during the mid to late 1990s. Love Is Colder Than Death claim that the series was inspired by their music.

The first few compilations featured music by many of the label's own artists, as well as guest appearance by other notable bands of the ethereal/gothic/darkwave scene including Bel Canto, Faith & the Muse, Gitane Demone, In The Nursery, Miranda Sex Garden, Ordo Equitum Solis and The Moon Seven Times. In 1997, American independent label Cleopatra Records released a Hyperium licensed compilation called Heavenly Voices subtitled, "A collection of the finest female vocals in ethereal, darkwave & gothic".

=== Artists ===
The following are artists with releases on Hyperium Records:

- !Bang Elektronika
- Attrition
- Autopsia
- Calva y Nada
- Chandeen
- Claire Voyant
- Clock DVA
- Dark Orange
- Die Form
- Digital Factor
- Digital Poodle
- Eleven Shadows
- Forthcoming Fire
- Jarboe
- The Wake
- Louisa John-Krol
- Love Is Colder Than Death
- Mellonta Tauta
- Mynox Layh
- Regenerator
- Sleeping Dogs Wake
- Still Patient?
- Stoa
- Sweet William
- The Tors of Dartmoor
- Rise And fall of a Decade
- Speaking Silence

The following artists were co-released by Hyperium Records and Projekt Records:

- Attrition
- Black Tape for a Blue Girl
- Bleak
- Eden
- Human Drama
- Love Spirals Downwards
- Soul Whirling Somewhere
