= VNV Nation discography =

- Studio albums: 12
- Extended plays: 3
- Live albums: 2
- Compilation albums: 1
- Singles: 12

The discography of VNV Nation, a British/Irish electronic music project, consists of ten studio albums, two compilation album, three extended plays, and twelve singles.

== Albums ==
=== Studio albums ===
| Year | Details | Peak chart positions | | | | | | |
| Year | Details | AUT | GER | SWE | SWI | US | US Heat. | US Dance |
|---|---|---|---|---|---|---|---|---|
| 1995 | Advance and Follow: Released: 30 November 1995; Label: Energy; Format: CD | — | — | — | — | — | — | — |
| 1998 | Praise the Fallen: Released: 2 June 1998; Label: Energy; Format: CD | — | — | — | — | — | — | — |
| 1999 | Empires: Released: 25 October 1999; Label: Dependent/Metropolis; Format: CD | — | — | — | — | — | — | — |
| 2002 | Futureperfect: Released: 28 January 2002; Label: Dependent/Metropolis; Format: CD | — | 26 | — | — | — | — | 24 |
| 2005 | Matter + Form: Released: 12 April 2005; Label: Anachron/Metropolis; Format: CD | — | 38 | — | — | — | 36 | 7 |
| 2007 | Judgement: Released: 5 April 2007; Label: Anachron/Metropolis; Format: CD | — | 55 | — | — | — | 28 | 6 |
| 2009 | Of Faith, Power and Glory: Release: 19 June 2009; Label: Anachron/Metropolis; Format: CD | — | 41 | — | — | 186 | 15 | 5 |
| 2011 | Automatic: Release: 16 September 2011; Label: Anachron/Metropolis; Format: CD | 66 | 8 | 50 | — | 21 | 17 | |
| 2013 | Transnational: Release: 11 October 2013; Label: Anachron/Metropolis; Format: CD | — | 9 | — | 99 | — | — | — |
| 2018 | Noire: Release: 12 October 2018; Label: Anachron/Metropolis; Format: CD/digital download | 49 | 4 | — | 54 | — | — | 18 |
| 2023 | Electric Sun: Release: 28 April 2023; Label: Anachron/Metropolis; Format: CD/digital download | 54 | 5 | — | — | — | — | — |
| 2025 | Construct: Release: 9 May 2025; Label: Anachron/Metropolis; Format: CD/digital download | 21 | 3 | — | 50 | — | — | — |
"—" denotes a release that did not chart.

=== Compilations ===
| Year | Album details | Peak chart positions | | |
| Year | Album details | GER | US Heat. | US Dance |
|---|---|---|---|---|
| 2015 | Resonance: Music for Orchestra Vol. 1: with Deutsches Filmorchester Babelsberg; Released: 15 May 2015; Label: Anachron/Metropolis; Format: CD/box set (CD+ 2xVinyl) | 7 | — | — |
"—" denotes a release that did not chart.

=== Live albums ===
| Year | Album details | Peak chart positions | | |
| Year | Album details | GER | US Heat. | US Dance |
|---|---|---|---|---|
| 2004 | Pastperfect: Released: 2004; Label: Anachron/Metropolis; Format: 2×DVD (+CD) | 96 | — | — |
| 2009 | Reformation 01: Released: 24 April 2009; Label: Anachron/Metropolis; Format: 2×CD (+DVD) | 48 | 41 | 13 |
"—" denotes a release that did not chart.

== Extended plays ==
| Year | EP details |
|---|---|
| 1998 | Solitary: Released: 1998; Label: Dependent; Format: CD |
| 1999 | Dark Angel: Released: 1999; Label: Metropolis Records; Format: CD |
| 2000 | Burning Empires: Released: 2000; Label: Dependent; Format: CD |
| 2012 | Crossing the Divide: Released: 2012; Label: Anachron; Format: Digital Download |

== Singles ==
| Year | Song | GER | Album |
|---|---|---|---|
| 1990 | "Body Pulse" | — | Non-album single |
| 1990 | "Strength of Youth" | — | Non-album single |
| 1999 | "Darkangel" | — | Empires |
| 2001 | "Cold" (R rated mig 29 Mix by DJ Kowalski) | — | No label |
| 2000 | "Standing" | — | Empires |
| 2001 | "Genesis" | 67 | Futureperfect |
| 2002 | "Beloved" | 70 | Futureperfect |
| 2003 | "Honour 2003" | 98 | Non-album single |
| 2005 | "Chrome" | — | Matter + Form |
| 2011 | "Control" | — | Automatic |

== Compilations ==
- Cyber-Tec America – (CD) 1995, Track #1 "Serial Killer (Tormented Version) – Invisible
- Elektrauma Vol. 2 – (CD) 1995, Track #12 "Requiem QCN (Martyr Version)" – Discordia
- Maschinenwelt Compilation – (CD) 1995, Track #9 "After Shock" – Maschinenwelt Records
- Taste This 4 – (2xCD) 1995, Disc #1, Track #5 "After Fire" – Discordia
- Best of Electronic Music – (2xCD, Ltd. Edition) 1998, Disc #2, Track # 4 "Solitary" – TCM Musikproduktionsgesellschaft mbH
- Deejay Tribe – (2xCD) 1998, Disc #1, Track #11 "Honour" – Credo
- Moonraker Vol. IV – (2xCD) 1998, Disc #1, Track #1 "Honour (Memorial Mix)" – Sub Terranean
- New Violent Breed – (CD) 1998, Track #3 "Solitary (Signals Edit)" – COP International
- The Flatline Compilation – (2xCD) 1998, Disc #2, Track #13 "Procession" – Flatline Records
- The Tyranny Off the Beat Vol. V – (2xCD) 1998, Disc #1, Track #2 "Solitary" – Off Beat
- Virtual X-mas 98 – (CD Mini, Ltd. Edition, Promo) 1998, Track #2 "Solitary (Signals Edit)" – Energy Rekords
- We Came to Dance – Indie Dancefloor Vol. 11 – (2xCD) 1998, Disc #1, Track #4 "Honour (Memorial Remix)" – Sub Terranean
- Zillo Festival Sampler 1998 – (2xCD) 1998, Disc #1, Track #15 "Joy" – Zillo
- ZilloScope: New Signs & Sounds 07-08/98 – (CD Sampler) 1998, Track #15 "Serial Killer (Version)" – Zillo
- Best of Electronic Music Vol. 2 – (2xCD) 1999, Disc #1, Track #14 "Rubicon" – TCM Musikproduktionsgesellschaft mbH
- Electro Club Attack – Shot Two – (2xCD) 1999, Disc #2, Track #3 "Solitary (Signals Edit)" – XXC, Zoomshot Media Entertainment
- Electro Mania – (CD) 1999, Track #7 "Honour" – Zoth Ommog
- Elegy – Numéro 3 – (CD) 1999, Track #4 "Rubicon" – Elegy
- Extreme Clubhits III – (CD) 1999, Track #4 "Rubicon (Full Length)" – UpSolution Recordings
- Sacrilege – A Tribute to Front 242 – (CD) 1999, Track #2 "Circling Overland" and Track #6 "DSM0" – Cleopatra
- Septic – (CD, Ltd. Edition) 1999, Track #9 "Rubicon (Raw Version)" – Dependent Records
- Sonic Seducer Cold Hands Seduction Vol. II – (CD Sampler) 1999, Track #4 "Rubicon (Empires-Version)" – Sonic Seducer
- Wax Trax! & TVT Records Present: Master Mix – (CD Promo) 1999, Track #11 "Ascension" – Wax Trax!, TVT Records
- Zillo Club Hits 4 – (CD) 1999, Track #4 "Joy" – Zillo
- Zillo Mystic Sounds 8 – (CD) 1999, Track #14 "Afterfire (Exkl. Remix) – Zillo
- Club Bizarre 1 – (2xCD) 2000, Disc #2, Track #1 "Legion" – Angelstar
- Critical M@55 – (CD) 2000, Track #8 "Rubicon" – Metropolis
- Metropolis 2000 – (CD) 2000, Track #3 "Darkangel" – Metropolis
- Orkus Club Hits 1 – (CD) 2000, Track #7 "Dark Angel (Album Version)" – Orkus
- Prospective Music Magazine: Volume 4 – (CD) 2000, Track #1 "Dark Angel (Gabriel)" – Prospective Music Magazine
- We Came to Dance 2000 – (2xCD) 2000, Disc #1, Track #3 "Darkangel (Apocalyptic Mix)" – GTN (Global Trance Network)
- Zillo Club Hits 5 – (CD) 2000, Track #1 "Legion (Janus Version)" – Zillo
- :Per:Version: Vol. 1 – (CD Enhanced) 2001, Track #3 "Standing (Motion)" – :Ritual:
- D-Side 3 – (CD Sampler) Track #5 "Cold (Rated 'R' Mix By Mig 29)" – D-Side
- Future Pop 01 – The Best of Modern Electronic – (2xCD) 2001, Disc #1, Track #4 "Standing (Motion)" – Angelstar
- Septic II – (CD) 2001, Track #1 "Further (RMX)" – Dependent Records
- Sonic Seducer Cold Hands Seduction Vol. XIV – (CD Enhanced + VCD) Disc #1, Track #1 "Epicentre" – Sonic Seducer
- Zillo Festival Sampler 2001 – (CD Sampler) 2001, Track #15 "Frika" – Zillo
- ZilloScope: New Signs & Sounds 12/01-01/02 – (CD Sampler, Enhanced) 2001, Track #8 "Holding On" – Zillo
- Advanced Electronics – (2xCD) 2002, Disc #1, Track #1 "Genesis (C92-Remix)" – Synthetic Symphony
- Critical M@55 Volume 3 – (CD Sampler) 2002, Track #4 "Genesis" – Metropolis
- D-Side 8 – (CD Sampler) 2002, Track #4 "Epicentre" – D-Side
- Deejay Parade Vol. 7 – (2xCD) 2002, Disc #2, Track #5 "Beloved (Hiver & Hammer UK Dubtrip)" – Dance Network
- Die Flut – (2xCD) 2002, Disc #2, Track #15 "Left Behind" – Scanner
- DJ Convention – Code Thirteen – (2xCD Mixed) 2002, Disc #2, Track #12 "Beloved (Hiver & Hammer's UK Dubtrip)" – Polystar Records
- Goodbye Ibiza (The Closing Party Compilation) – (2xCD) 2002, Disc #2, Track #9 "Beloved (Hiver & Hammer UK Dubtrip)" – More Music
- Judgement Day Festival Compilation Vol. 1 – (CD) 2002, Track #2 "Standing (Original)" – Batbeliever Releases
- Metropolis 2002 – (CD) 2002, Track #9 "Epicenter" – Metropolis
- Orkus Presents: The Best of 2001 – (CD) 2002, Disc #1, Track #3 "Genesis (Single Version)" – Orkus, Angelwings
- Orkus Presents: The Best of 2002 – (CD) 2002, Disc #1, Track #3 "Beloved (Grey Dawn Rmx)" – Orkus, Angelwings
- Orkus Presents: The Best of the 90s 2 – (2xCD) 2002, Disc #1, Track #8 "Solitary (Signals Version)" – Orkus
- Oslo Synthfestival 2002 – (CD) 2002, Track #2 "Epicentre" – Oslo Synthfestival
- Sonic Seducer Cold Hands Seduction Vol. 20 – (CD Sampler + VCD) 2002, VCD #2 "Epicentre (Live)" – Sonic Seducer
- Synth & Wave Essentials – (2xCD) 2002, Disc #2, Track #14 "Epicentre" – ZYX Music
- Techno Club Vol. 17 – Talla 2XLC >>> His Own Challenge – (2xCD) 2002, Disc #2, Track #7 "Beloved (Hiver & Hammer UK Dubtrip)" – Dance Division
- Trancemaster 3004 – (2xCD) 2002, Disc #2, Track #5 "Beloved (Hiver & Hammer Full Vocal Mix)" – Vision Soundcarriers
- Zillo Dark Summer – Best of Goth Open Airs 2002 – (2xCD) 2002, Disc #1, Track # 4 "Genesis (C92 Version)" – Zillo
- Advanced Electronics Vol. 2 – (2xCD) 2003, Disc #1, Track #1 "Honour 2003 (FDR Version)" – Synthetic Symphony • (2xCD, Reissue) 2007, Disc #1, Track #1 "Honour 2003 (FDR Version)" – Synthetic Symphony
- D-Side 17 – (CD Sampler) 2003, Track #4 "Legion (Live)" – D-Side
- Dark Nights (The Best of Technopop & Futurepop) – (2xCD) 2003, Disc #2, Track #2 "Beloved" – Bit Music
- Dark Roses – 36 Mystic and Electropop Romantics – (2xCD) 2003, Disc #1, Track #7 "Genesis (Single Version)" – Sony Music Entertainment (Germany)
- Electrixmas 2003 – (CD Enhanced, Promo) 2003, Track #12 "Epicenter" – Electrixmas
- Extreme Clubhits VII – (CD) 2003, Track #2 "Genesis (C-92 Mix)" – UpSolution Recordings
- Nachtwelten – (CD) 2003, Track #15 "Beloved" – Terra Zone
- Sonic Seducer Cold Hands Seduction Vol. 29 – (CD Sampler, Enhanced) 2003, Video #1 "Pastperfect Trailer 3.0" – Sonic Seducer
- This Is Neo-Goth – (3xCD) 2003, Disc #1, Track #1 "Genesis (Icon Of Coil Version)" – Cleopatra
- Tonedeaf Records Presents: Vinyl Conflict No. 1 – (CD) 2003, Track #11 "Fearless" – ToneDeaf Records
- 2Faces – (CD, Mixed) 2004, Track #8 "Beloved (Hiver & Hammer's UK Dub Trip)" – Silly Spider Music
- Dependence – Next Level Electronics – (CD) 2004, Track #6 "Legion (Anachron)" – Dependent Records
- Dimitris Papaspyropoulos Presents: Blessed and Cursed – (2xCD) 2004, Disc #2, Track #5 "Genesis (Apoptygma Berzerk Remix)" – Eros Music (Greece)
- Into The Darkness Volume 1 – (DVD) 2004, Track #3 "Legion" – Nightclub Records
- New Signs & Sounds 6/04 – (CD Sampler, Enhanced) 2004, Video #1 "Honour (Live)" – Zillo
- Psycho Tina's Hell House of Horrors – (CD Enhanced) 2004, Track #11 "Circling Overland" – Cleopatra
- Advanced Electronics Vol. 4 – (2xCD) 2005, Disc #1, Track #3 "Chrome (Soman Rx Longer)" – Synthetic Symphony
- Cyberl@b Volume [5.0] – (2xCD) 2005, Disc #1, Track #7 "Chrome" – Alfa Matrix
- D-Side 27 – (CD Sampler) 2005, Track #5 "Entropy" – D-Side
- Dark Summer 2005 • 2 – (CD Sampler) 2005, Track #1 "Chrome" – Zillo
- E:O:D Vol. 1 (2xCD) – (2xCD) 2005, Disc #1, Track #11 "Structure" – Excentric Records
- Extreme Clubhits X – (2xCD, Ltd. Edition) Disc #1, Track #1 "Chrome" – UpSolution Recordings
- Into the Darkness Volume 2 – (DVD) 2005, Track #8 "Honour 2003 (Wave Gotik Treffen)" – Nightclub Records
- M'era Luna Festival 2005 – (2xCD) 2005, Disc #1, Track #1 "Perpetual" – Totentanz
- Metropolis 2005 – (CD + DVD) 2005, CD Track #2 "Chrome" and DVD Track #5 "Beloved" – Metropolis
- New Signs & Sounds 02/05 – (CD Sampler, Enhanced) 2005, Video Interview "Elektronisches Hilfswerk" – Zillo
- New Signs & Sounds 04/05 – (CD Sampler, Enhanced) 2005, Track #1 "Entropy" – Zillo
- Orkus Presents: The Ultimate Club Guide 2 (KulturRuine: Die Ersten 10 Jahre) – (2xCD) 2005, "Electronaut" – Angelstar, Orkus
- Sonic Seducer Cold Hands Seduction Vol. 48 – (CD Sampler, Enhanced) – (CD Sampler, Enhanced) 2005, Track #4 "Chrome (Bolloxed Remix)" – Sonic Seducer
- Sonic Seducer Cold Hands Seduction Vol. 54 – (CD Sampler, Enhanced + VCD) 2005, VCD Video #1 "Chrome (Live)" – Sonic Seducer
- This Is... Techno Body Music Vol. 1 – (2xCD) 2005, Disc #1, Track #8 "Interceptor (ABM Version)" – Masterhit Recordings
- Castle Party 2006 – (CD) 2006, Track #2 "Chrome" – Castle Party Productions
- Dark Flower Vol. II – (2xCD) 2006, Disc #1, Track #3 "Perpetual" – Angelstar
- Extended Electronics – (2xCD) 2006, Disc #1, Track #5 "Chrome (22.7 MHz Mix by Modcom)" – Angelstar
- Infacted 3 – (CD) 2006, Track #1 "Chrome (27.2 MHz Mix by Modcom)" – Infacted Recordings
- Orkus Presents: The Best of 2005 – (2xCD) 2006, Disc #1, Track #14 "Chrome" – Angelstar
- [:SITD:] Bestie:Mensch – (CD Album + CD, Ltd. Edition) 2007, Disc #2, Track #1 "Chrome" – Accession Records
- D-Side 39 – (CD Sampler) 2007, Track #5 "Nemesis (Divine Command Version)" – D-Side
- Extreme Clubhits XI – (2xCD) 2007, Disc #1, Track #7 "Nemesis (Full Length)" – Indigo, Upscene
- Fxxk The Mainstream Vol. 1 – (4xCD) 2007, Disc #4, Track #5 "Nemesis (Divine Command Mix)" – Alfa Matrix
- M'era Luna – Best of 2000 – 2006 – (DVD Sampler) 2007, Track #7 "Chrome (M'era Luna 2005)" – Sonic Seducer
- New Signs & Sounds 04/07 – (CD Sampler, Enhanced) 2007, Track #10 "Nemesis (Divine Command Edit)" – Zillo
- DJ Gio MC-505 @ Electro Remote Controller Vol. 02 – (CDr, Promo) 2008, Track #26 "Standing" – Robot Radio Mix
- Metropolis:Rebirth 1.0 – (2xCD) 2008, Disc #1, Track #1 "Nemesis" – Metropolis
- Sonic Seducer Cold Hands Seduction Vol. 82 – (DVD) 2008, Track #2 "Perpetual (Live 2007) (Unveröffentlicht)" – Sonic Seducer

=== Remixes ===
As of 2011, VNV Nation has remixed the songs of 24 artists.

- !Aiboforcen - "E.W.I.F"
- Wumpscut - "Totmacher"
- AFI - "Miss Murder"
- Apoptygma Berzerk - "Kathy's Song (Come Lie Next to Me)"
- Bio-Tek - "Die-Sect"
- Boytronic - "Living Without You"
- Claire Voyant - "Majesty"
- Combichrist - "All Pain is Gone"
- D.A.F. - "Der Sheriff"
- Das Ich - "Destillat"
- Deine Lakaien - "Where You Are"
- De/Vision - "I Regret"
- In Strict Confidence - "Industrial Love"
- Ironbase - "Maschine Eisenbass Rockt"
- Joachim Witt - "Wo Versteckt Sich Gott?"
- Lights of Euphoria - "True Life"
- Mindless Self Indulgence - "Shut Me Up", "What Do They Know"
- Phillip Boa - "So What"
- Project Pitchfork - "Existence"
- Ravelab - "Push"
- Revolution By Night - "Faithless"
- Suicide Commando - "Hellraiser"
- Theatre of Tragedy - "Machine"
- Within Temptation - "Sinéad"

== Video games ==
| Year | Game | Notes |
|---|---|---|
| 2017 | Hellblade: Senua's Sacrifice | "Illusion" featured in the game's ending and end credits |
| 2023 | Firmament | "Collide" featured in the game's ending, end credits and launch trailer |
