= Resonance: Music For Orchestra Vol. 1 =

Resonance: Music for Orchestra Vol. 1

Studio album by VNV Nation & Der Film Orchester Babelsberg
- Released: 15 May 2015
- Recorded: February 2015
- Genre: Modern classical, Orchestral, Alternative rock, electronic, symphonic pop
- Length: 68:54
- Label: Anachron Sounds

VNV Nation chronology
Transnational (2013)	Resonance (2015)	Noire (2018)

Limited Edition cover

Resonance: Music for Orchestra Vol. 1 is an orchestral album by the German-based alternative electronic band VNV Nation, with the Deutsches Filmorchester Babelsberg, released on 15 May 2015 on VNV's own Anachron Sounds label. All songs are from their back catalogue, arranged for orchestra and voice.

It was released on CD and digital formats, as well as a limited edition 6 x 10" vinyl box set. Both the limited edition vinyl and iTunes digital versions have exclusive bonus tracks, both of songs originally from their previous album Transnational.

It was VNV Nation's highest charting release at the time, reaching number 7 in the German charts (two weeks) and no. 73 in the Austrian charts (1 week), and number 3 (1 week) on Billboard's "Classical Crossover" Albums chart.

== Background ==
On 11 November 2012, VNV Nation played at the first Gothic meets Klassik in Leipzig. This set was accompanied by a full symphony orchestra. It marked the first time VNV Nation had done a set like this. The show was recorded for release, but the recorded audio was unusable. As a result, Ronan began work with the arranger, Conrad Oleak, on plans for an album, later titled Resonance, of VNV Nation songs, scored for orchestra. As well as the original eight songs performed, there were an additional five songs re-written for orchestra. The songs 'Nova (Largo)' and 'Teleconnect, Part 2' were recorded with a piano and string trio ensemble.

The Deutsches Filmorchester Babelsberg was recorded in the Babelsberg Studios outside Berlin at the end of February 2015, the same studios where scores for films such as The Hunger Games: Mockingjay – Part 1 & Part 2.

== Track listing ==
All lyrics are written by Ronan Harris; all music is composed by VNV Nation/Conrad Oleak

No.	Title	Original release	Length
1.	"Nova (Maestoso)"	Automatic	6:22
2.	"Legion (Vivace Con Affeto)"	Empires	3:14
3.	"Solitary (Allegro Con Spirito)"	Praise the Fallen	6:07
4.	"Further (Adante Apassionato)"	Burning Empires	4:47
5.	"Perpetual (Allegro Espressivo)"	Matter + Form	5:11
6.	"Illusion (Adante Grazioso)"	Judgement	5:14
7.	"Nova (Largo)"	Automatic	9:05
8.	"Sentinel (Moderato Sostenuto)"	Of Faith, Power and Glory	7:54
9.	"Standing (Moderato Declamando)"	Empires	5:47
10.	"Beloved (Allegro Grazioso)"	Futureperfect	7:31
11.	"Resolution (Allegro Con Fuoco)"	Automatic	7:41
Total length:			68:54

Vinyl Bonus Track
No.	Title	Original release	Length
12.	"If I Was (Allegretto Affettuoso)"	Transnational

iTunes Bonus Track
No.	Title	Original release	Length
12.	"Teleconnect Pt. 2 (Adagio Sonoro)"	Transnational	6:39
Total length:			75:33
