= Revolution by Night =

RBN UK
- Also known as: Revolution by Night, RBN, RBN UK, 'stok:'holm
- Origin: London, England
- Genres: Futurepop, synth-pop, EBM
- Instrument: Synthesizer
- Years active: Mark I: 1994–1999, Mark II: 2000–2005, Mark III: 2006–2012
- Past members: Steve Weeks; Bryon Adamson; Phil Eaton; Revolution by Night Mk I & II / RBN / Stok:holm: Bryon Adamson (1993-2013); Revolution by Night Mk I: Eric Gandoin (1993-94); Gary Durham-Carmichael (1994-95); Nick Roberts (1995); Paul Hindle (1995-98); Paul Swift (1995-97); Eddie Martin (1997-99); Revolution by Night Mk II: Geoff Butler (2003); Kevin King (2003-05); RBN: Penny Monsen (2006)

Revolution by Night were an electronic music band based in London, England. Often referred to simply as RBN, the only continuous members of the band were founding members Steve Weeks (vocal/keyboards/programming) and Bryon Adamson (keyboards/programming), with Phil Eaton (keyboards) joining in 2006.

== Revolution by Night Mk I (1994–1999) ==
Revolution by Night were originally a four-piece band featuring vocalist Steve Weeks and bassist Bryon Adamson who were heavily influenced by bands such as Fields of the Nephilim and the Sisters of Mercy. They recorded the album Breathe in 1994, which was released the following year. No further releases followed other than a handful of compilation album tracks, and the group ceased activity in their current format in 1999. The band was originally known as Restoration II from 1992 until 1994 which was a continuation of Weeks' previous band Restoration, with all new members (including Bryon Adamson, Eric Gandoin and Richard Pyne) sourced via an advert placed in UK music newspaper Melody Maker. Richard Pyne from Restoration II went on to form the bands Killing Miranda and Uberbyte. The ex-members of Restoration went on to form goth rock act Vendemmian.

== Revolution by Night Mk II (2000–2005) ==
In late 1999, having previously unrealised ambitions in this area, Weeks set up a small home studio and began working on new synth-based material with Bryon Adamson and together began to develop a new sound following a full-blooded electronic approach. The first fruits of their labour surfaced at the following year's Wave-Gotik-Treffen festival in Leipzig, where the band played a synthesiser heavy set debuting the future RBN anthem "Faithless" written by Weeks on a Novation Supernova and a Korg Trinity rack. For some fans of the band, the new sound was as unexpected as it was very positively received, although Weeks and Adamson had been increasing the use of synthesisers in unreleased material for some time.

In June 2003, the Faithless EP was released. Featuring remixes of the title track by Ronan Harris of VNV Nation and Tom Shear of Assemblage 23, the EP contained two other new songs, "Schadenfreude" and "Higher Ground (voxless)" and two completely reworked older songs. With the EP reaching No. 14 in the DAC (German Alternative Chart) and No. 3 in the Belgian Side-line chart, the band again made an appearance at the Wave-Gotik-Treffen festival in Leipzig. The VNV Nation remix went on to become a dance floor hit at the Slimelight club in London.

RBN then spent most of 2004 and 2005 all but on hiatus and although new material was written during this time, all of it was subsequently scrapped.

== RBN (a.k.a. Revolution by Night Mk III) (2006–2012) / Stok:holm / DKAG (2013–present) ==
In 2006, the band relaunched supporting Covenant on their 2006 UK tour, playing a set of almost all new songs. A steady following began to develop, mainly in the London scene, with RBN supporting many of the scene's well known names. The following year saw the band's remix of the Reaper track "X-Junkie" released on Reaper's CD The Devil Is Female, which reached number one in the German DAC chart in January 2008. Writing continued during the year for what would become the City Lights album. Pre-production studio work on the album was completed by late 2010 and handed over to producer Krischan Wesenberg from Rotersand, with the finished album slated for release in 2011. In November 2010, Weeks remixed Komor Kommando's track "Shrapnel". Apart from a couple of live dates in 2011 the band did little else.

In November 2012, RBN announced that they had changed their name to stok:holm, then finally and quietly released the much delayed 'City Lights' album on 1 January 2013 under the new name. Stok:holm have neither played live dates, nor produced any new music, and appear to be on permanent hiatus.

Weeks has worked since with fellow London DJ Emmerick Gortz in the ebm\tech band DKAG, who have released an EP named "Short Wave", in 2015 and have played multiple live shows supporting bands such as Reaper, Suicide Commando, Phosgore, Combichrist, Apoptygma Berzerk, Velvet Acid Christ, Icon of Coil, and Aesthetic Perfection.

== Discography ==
=== Revolution by Night (Mk I) ===
- Breathe (1995, M&A Musicart) (album)
- "Touch" (track on compilation album)
- "Selling Heaven" (track on compilation album)
- "Kingdom Come" (track on a Mission covers album)

=== RBN (Revolution by Night Mk II and III) / Stok:holm / DKAG ===
RBN (Revolution by Night Mk II and III)

- Faithless EP (2003, Sonic-X) - includes remixes by Ronan Harris (VNV Nation) and Assemblage 23
- Zillo Club Hits 9 (2004, Zillo) - contains the track "Faithless (Ronan Harris remix)".
- Into the Darkness Vol. 1 DVD (2004, CrazyClips) - includes the video to "Schadenfreude"
- Machine Code (2006, 5-track limited edition tour CD) - originally only available at RBN concerts

Stok:holm

- City Lights (2013, download-only album) - all material written by Weeks/Adamson in 2006/2007, recorded by RBN 2007-2010 but released under the band name Stok:holm, Sixty4bitMediaRelease

DKAG

- Short Wave (2015, limited edition physical CD and digital release, Sixty4BitMediaRelease)
- Slimelight Muzik (14 October 2017, limited edition physical CD and digital release, Sixty4bitMediaRelease)

=== Remixes for other artists ===
- Reaper - The Devil Is Female - CD contains "X-Junkie (Revolution by Night remix)" (2007, Infacted)
- System:FX - High:Definition:Violence (2008) - CD contains "Turn to Rust (RBN "No Matter" remix)"
- Straftanz - Straftanz UK (featuring RBN) (2009, online streaming only)
- Nachtmahr - Maedchen in Uniform - CD contains "Tanz Diktator (RBN remix)" (2009, Trisol)
- Komor Kommando - Oil, Steel and Rhythm - 2-CD version contains "Shrapnel (RBN Mood Music mix)" (2011, Alfa Matrix)
