= Honour (song) =

"Honour 2003"

Single by VNV Nation

from the album Futureperfect
- A-side: "Honour"
- B-side: Fearless; Legion; Second Skin
- Genre: Futurepop
- Label: Anachron; SOUND-1
- Songwriter: Ronan Harris
- Producer: Ronan Harris

"Honor" is a song by VNV Nation from the band's 1998 album, Praise the Fallen.

In the 2003, they re-recorded the song and released it as a single under the title "Honour 2003". It was their first single released on their own Anachron imprint, after they left Dependent. The single charted in the German mainstream Media Control charts for one week at no. 98.

== Track listing ==
1. Honour 2003 [8:07]
2. Fearless (Live) [6:33]
3. Legion (Live) [4:45]
4. Secondskin (Spoken) [6:37]
