= Pastperfect =

Video by VNV Nation
- Released: 4 May 2004
- Genre: Futurepop
- Label: Anachron

VNV Nation chronology
| Futureperfect (2002) | Pastperfect (2004) | Matter + Form (2005) |

Pastperfect is a live DVD by VNV Nation that was released on 4 May 2004 containing; a 12 track live DVD, and a DVD and CD of interviews, behind the scenes, a making of, and videos of live footage.

It charted at no. 96 in the mainstream German chart, for one week.

== Track listing ==
DVD 1: Live
| No. | Title | Length |
|---|---|---|
| 1. | "Intro" (Live) |
| 2. | "Kingdom" (Live) |
| 3. | "Epicentre" (Live) |
| 4. | "Honour" (Live) |
| 5. | "Fearless" (Live) |
| 6. | "Forsaken" (Live) |
| 7. | "Genesis" (Live) |
| 8. | "Darkangel" (Live) |
| 9. | "Standing (Motion)" (Live) |
| 10. | "Solitary" (Live) |
| 11. | "Beloved" (Live) |
| 12. | "Electronaut" (Live) |

DVD 2: Bonus Material
| No. | Title | Length |
|---|---|---|
| 1. | "Interview (Part 1)" |
| 2. | "Tour Preparations" |
| 3. | "Pastimperfect (Tour Impressions)" |
| 4. | "City Special: Paris, New York, Zurich" |
| 5. | "The Making of Futureperfect" |

CD: Bonus Material
| No. | Title | Length |
|---|---|---|
| 1. | "Interview (Part 2)" |
| 2. | "Procession" (Live At WGT 1999) |
| 3. | "Standing" (Live At Mera Luna 2000) |
| 4. | "Electronaut" (Stage Video) |
