= Burning Empires =

EP by VNV Nation
- Released: 3 April 2000
- Recorded: 2000
- Genre: Futurepop, EBM
- Length: 62:48
- Label: Dependent Records
- Producer: VNV Nation

VNV Nation chronology
Darkangel (1999)	Burning Empires (2000)	Standing (2000)

Burning Empires is an EP from VNV Nation. It contains remixes and alternate versions of tracks from their popular album Empires, plus the "Standing" single. It is a limited edition release of 4,700 copies. The album was made available on the iTunes Music Store, as well as on Napster and Amazon MP3 Downloads.

"Further" and "Radius²" were the only entirely new tracks on Burning Empires. "Lastlight" was a remix of "Firstlight"/"Arclight" from Empires. The exclusive version of "Savior" has a full vocal track (the previously released album version is an instrumental).

A cover of "Further" by the band LifeForce was used in the video game Iji, and while not released on any CD, it was made available for public download.

== Track listing ==
Burning Empires
No.	Title	Length
1.	"Lastlight"	5:55
2.	"Kingdom" (Restoration)	6:28
3.	"Further"	5:25
4.	"Legion" (Janus)	6:38
5.	"Saviour" (Vox)	6:59
6.	"Fragments" (Splinter)	5:29
7.	"Legion" (Anachron)	3:16
Total length:		40:10

Standing Single
No.	Title	Length
1.	"Standing" (Still)	4:10
2.	"Standing" (Motion)	8:09
3.	"Radius²"	4:39
4.	"Standing" (Original)	5:40
Total length:		22:38
