= Construct (VNV Nation album) =

Studio album by VNV Nation
- Released: 9 May 2025
- Recorded: 2023–24
- Studios: Anachron, Hamburg
- Genres: Electropop, synthpop, futurepop, Electronic body music
- Length: 54:28
- Label: Anachron Sounds
- Producer: Ronan Harris

VNV Nation chronology
Electric Sun (2023)	Construct (2025)	Destruct (2025)

Singles from Construct
- 1. "Silence Speaks" Released: 21 March 2025; 2. "Station 21" Released: 16 April 2025; 3. "By Your Side" Released: 2 May 2025

Construct is the twelfth studio album by the Irish alternative electronic band VNV Nation. The album was released on May 9, 2025, under Anachron Sounds, with the follow-up album Destruct being released a few weeks later.

VNV Nation released three singles for the album, that being the surprise release of "Silence Speaks" on March 21, 2025, "Station 21" on April 16, 2025, and "By Your Side" on May 2, 2025.

== Background ==
The original concept for the album, a double album called "Construct // Destruct", was announced on June 9, 2024, alongside the Construct // Destruct tour, with the original album release date of March 28, 2025.

The album was eventually split into two separate albums, Construct and Destruct, due to length issues, with several track names revealed, including "Nothing Left", which eventually become "Nothing More", "Silence Speaks", "On Other Oceans", and "Frontier", eventually renamed to "Frontier I + II".

Ronan, about the album split, said, "The development of the second album became complicated and took on a life of its own. In the end, I decided I'd rather make two separate albums so they get all the attention they deserve and I can give each album the time it needs".

In an interview, Ronan Harris described the album as, "We are two wolves. And you have to feed the right wolf, but if you study psychology, you know, they describe one, half of us at the shadow self, the one we pushed down into the background, which causes us all the problems, and we have to make friends with it.", also saying the album would, "make all those people happy who like "Illusion" or "Space & Time" or whatever".

The album, just like its predecessor Electric Sun, was delayed due to a "unforeseen and unavoidable production issue", with the new release date being May 9, 2025 and the release date for Destruct also being postponed. Alongside the delay announcement, the lead single "Silence Speaks" was announced for release in a few days, with the exact date unmentioned. The song was eventually released on March 21, 2025.

== Promotion ==
=== Tour ===
In June 2024, the album, alongside a tour called "Construct // Destruct" was announced, including thirty eight shows located in Europe and opening act STRAIGHT RAZOR, followed by several festival appearances including Der Schwarze Ball 2025 and Amphi Festival 2025.

The show in Milan, Italy at the Slaughter Club, originally scheduled for March 7, 2025, was moved to a different venue, the Legend Club, with a new tour date of May 30, 2025 due to issues with the venue, before the rescheduled show was cancelled.

=== Other ===
Ronan teased a song that had not been released or played live at that point during an interview.

== Track listing ==
The track listing for the album was revealed through Apple Music on March 21, 2025, with the specific song lengths being revealed through Spotify on April 16, 2025.

All tracks are written by Ronan Harris.

No.	Title	Length
1.	"Hymn"	2:24
2.	"The Spaces Between"	4:43
3.	"Station 21"	5:43
4.	"By Your Side"	4:49
5.	"Nothing More"	5:30
6.	"Save Me"	5:29
7.	"Close to Heaven"	7:09
8.	"Silence Speaks"	5:08
9.	"On Other Oceans"	6:05
10.	"Frontier I + II"	7:28
Total length:		54:28

== Charts ==
Chart performance for Construct
Chart (2025)	Peak position
German Albums (Offizielle Top 100)	3
Swiss Albums (Schweizer Hitparade)	50
