= When Is the Future? =

Single by VNV Nation

from the album Noire
- Released: 8 October 2018
- Genre: Futurepop
- Length: 5:11
- Label: Anachron Sounds
- Songwriter: Ronan Harris
- Producer: Ronan Harris

VNV Nation singles chronology
"When Is the Future?" (2018)	"Before the Rain" (2023)

"When Is the Future?" is a single by VNV Nation from their album Noire. It was released on 8 October 2018, a few days before the European release of the album. This song was released with a music video, VNV Nation's first.

The song became a hit single for the band, being one of very few VNV songs to reach ten million views on YouTube and ten million streams on Spotify.

== Music video ==
The music video for "When Is the Future?" was directed by Michael and Flora Winkler, and filmed in Tokyo during late 2018.

== Reception ==
"When Is the Future?" was praised upon release. Douglas Leach, writing for Regen Mag, described the song as, "leaning a bit more into the synthwave sound than standard VNV Nation and ending up being a well-written pop song".

Annika Heller also praised the song in her review, saying, "With its regular beats and future pop elements, I couldn’t help but imagining myself walking to the song’s rhythm through a metropolis as a stranger, just like Ronan Harris on his stroll through Tokyo".
