= Reaper (band) =

- Origin: Frankfurt, Germany
- Genres: Aggrotech, electro-industrial
- Years active: 2005–present
- Label: Infacted Recordings
- Members: Vasi Vallis
- Website: http://www.reaper-music.de/

Reaper is the electro-industrial project of Vasi Vallis.

== History ==
Reaper was formed by Vasi Vallis shortly before the dissolution of his NamNamBulu project and took on greater prominence following the split. The 'Angst EP' was released in July 2005. The project played a number of live shows prior to the release of the full-length album 'Hell Starts With An H' in early 2007. The project toured Europe supporting Combichrist around this time. At the end of 2007, the EP 'The Devil Is Female' was released, reaching No.1 in the DAC.

== Discography ==
Angst EP (Infacted, 2005)

1. Jagd
2. Angst
3. Daemon
4. Totengraeber (Club Edit)
5. Angst (Soman Remix)
6. Totengraeber (Original edit)
7. Daemon (Gudfried Remix by Heimataerde)
8. Weltfremd
9. Verloren.

Hell Starts With An H CD (Infacted, 2007)

1. Intro
2. Urnensand
3. Das Grauen
4. Twisted Trophy Hunter - (with Mark Jackson of VNV Nation)
5. Altum Silentium
6. Execution of Your Mind
7. Weltfremd - (with Suicide Commando/Johan Van Roy)
8. Robuste Maschine
9. Memento Mori
10. Totengraber 07
11. Ancient Tragedy
12. Tth 2.0 - (with NVMPH)
13. Urnensand - (S.A.M. remix)
14. Execution of Your Mind - (Modulate remix)
15. Urnensand - (Damonie/Painbastard remix)
16. Twisted Trophy Hunter - (remix)
17. Urnensand - (Schallfaktor remix)

The Devil Is Female EP (Infacted, 2007)

1. The Devil Is Female
2. X-Junkie
3. She Is a Devil and a Whore
4. X-Junkie (Club Mix)
5. 0190
6. X-Junkie (Shnarph Remix)
7. X-Junkie (Grendel Remix)
8. X-Junkie (Distatix Remix)
9. X-Junkie (Syncrotek Remix)
10. Execution of Your Mind (live)
11. X-Junkie (Revolution by Night Remix)

Dirty Cash CDM (Infacted Recordings, 2010)

1. Dirty Cash (Feat. Pete Crane)
2. Purple Rain (Instrumental)
3. Dinero Sucio (Feat. Javi Ssagittar)
4. Dirty Cash (Noisuf-X Rmx)
5. Purple Rain (Dub Instrumental)
6. Robuste Maschine (Mono Tonic)
7. Dirty Cash (Rock Me Amadeus)
8. Dirty Cash (Syncrotek Rmx)
9. Dirty Cash (Eisenfunk Rmx)
10. Dirty Cash (Adinferna Rmx)
11. Dirty Cash (Skyla Vertex Rmx)

Der Schnitter EP (Infacted Recordings, 2015)

1. Der Schnitter (im Club)
2. Der Schnitter (mit der Sense)
3. Der Schnitter (beim Trinken mit Henrik Iversen)
4. Der Schnitter (by Skyla Vertex)
5. Der Schnitter (Vasi breaks the rules)
6. Der Schnitter (im Club mit der Sense)

Babylon Killed The Music CD (Infacted Recordings, 2016)

1. Cracking Skulls
2. The Sound Of Ids
3. Sledge Hammer
4. Farewell
5. We Are Reaper
6. Sechzehn Punkte Plan
7. Neophyte
8. Footprint
9. Aladin Killed Jfk
10. Divide The Sea
11. Silver Love

Remixes

1. Painbastard - Nervenkrieg (Reaper Mix)
2. Extize - Hellektrostar (Reaper Remix)
3. Suicide Commando - Menschenfresser (Reaper Remix)
4. [SITD] - Rot (Remix by Reaper)
5. Nachtmahr - Feuer Frei! (Reaper Remix)
6. Suicide Commando - Unterwelt (Reaper Remix)
7. Shiv-R - Taste (Reaper Remix)
8. SAM - Training (Reaper Remix)
9. VNV Nation - Tomorrow never comes (Reaper Remix)

Compilations

1. Endzeit Bunkertracks Act 2 (Alfa Matrix, 2006) | Reaper - Angst
2. Nacht der Maschinene Vol. 1 (Infacted Recordings, 2007) | Reaper - She Is A Devil And A Whore (DJ Edit)
3. Extreme Lustlieder Vol. 1 (UpScene, 2008) | Reaper - She Is A Devil And A Whore
4. Empire of Darkness Vol. 2 (Kom4 Medien, 2008) | Reaper - X-Junkie (FSK-18 Mix)
5. Tanzlabor 2010 | Reaper - Robuste Maschine
6. Nacht der Maschinen Vol. 3 (Infacted Recordings, 2011) | Reaper - Dirty Dancing (Studio-X Hard Dance Remix)
7. Resistanz Festival Soundtrack 2015 (Digital World Audio, 2015) | Reaper - Drive Thru
