= Genesis (VNV Nation song) =

Single by VNV Nation

from the album Futureperfect
- A-side: "Genesis"
- B-side: Weltfunk; Left Behind
- Released: 2001
- Genre: EBM; futurepop; synth-pop
- Label: Dependent
- Songwriter: Ronan Harris
- Producer: Ronan Harris

VNV Nation singles chronology
"Standing" (2000)	"Genesis" (2001)	"Beloved" (2001)

"Genesis" is a single by VNV Nation from their album Futureperfect. It was released in 2001, in advance of the album.

It was released in two track listings.

It charted in the German mainstream Media Control charts for two weeks, peaking at no. 67.

== Track listing ==
Genesis 1 (CD, Dependent MIND-029)

1. "Genesis (Single Version)" - 5:45
2. "Weltfunk" - 4:39
3. "Genesis (Icon of Coil Version)" - 7:45
4. "Genesis (Thomas P. Heckmann Version)" - 5:53

Genesis 2 (CD, Dependent MIND-030)

1. "Genesis (Single Version)" - 5:47
2. "Genesis (C92 Version)" - 6:30
3. "Left Behind" - 4:42
4. "Genesis (Ivory Frequency Version)" - 8:06
