= Beloved (VNV Nation song) =

Single by VNV Nation

from the album Futureperfect
- A-side: "Beloved"
- Released: 2001
- Genre: Futurepop
- Label: Dependent, 3Lanka
- Songwriter: Ronan Harris
- Producer: Ronan Harris

VNV Nation singles chronology
| "Genesis" (2001) | "Beloved" (2001) | "Chrome" (2005) |

"Beloved" is a single by VNV Nation from their album Futureperfect. The song was released in 2002, alongside the album.

The song was released in two CD versions and one limited 12" version.

It charted in the German mainstream Media Control charts for one week at no. 70.

== Track listing ==
Beloved.1 (CD, Dependent MIND-037)

1. Beloved (Short Version) 3:53
2. Beloved (Hiver & Hammer's UK Dub Trip) 8:09
3. Fearless (Original Version) 6:22
4. Beloved (Remix By Ernst Horn Of Deine Lakaien) 5:23

Beloved.2 (CD, Dependent MIND-038)

1. Beloved (Grey Dawn Version By VNV Nation) 7:34
2. Genesis (Apoptygma Berzerk Remix) 6:40
3. Holding On (Demo Version) 4:18
4. Beloved (Tim Schuldt Feat. D-Foundation Remix) 5:27

Beloved.3 (12", 3 Lanka 3-LAN-057)

A1. Beloved (Hiver & Hammer UK Dubtrip) 9:10
B1. Beloved (Hiver & Hammer Full Vocal) 8:56
B2. Beloved (Hiver & Hammer Full Vocal Edit) 3:57
