= Girls Under Glass =

German band

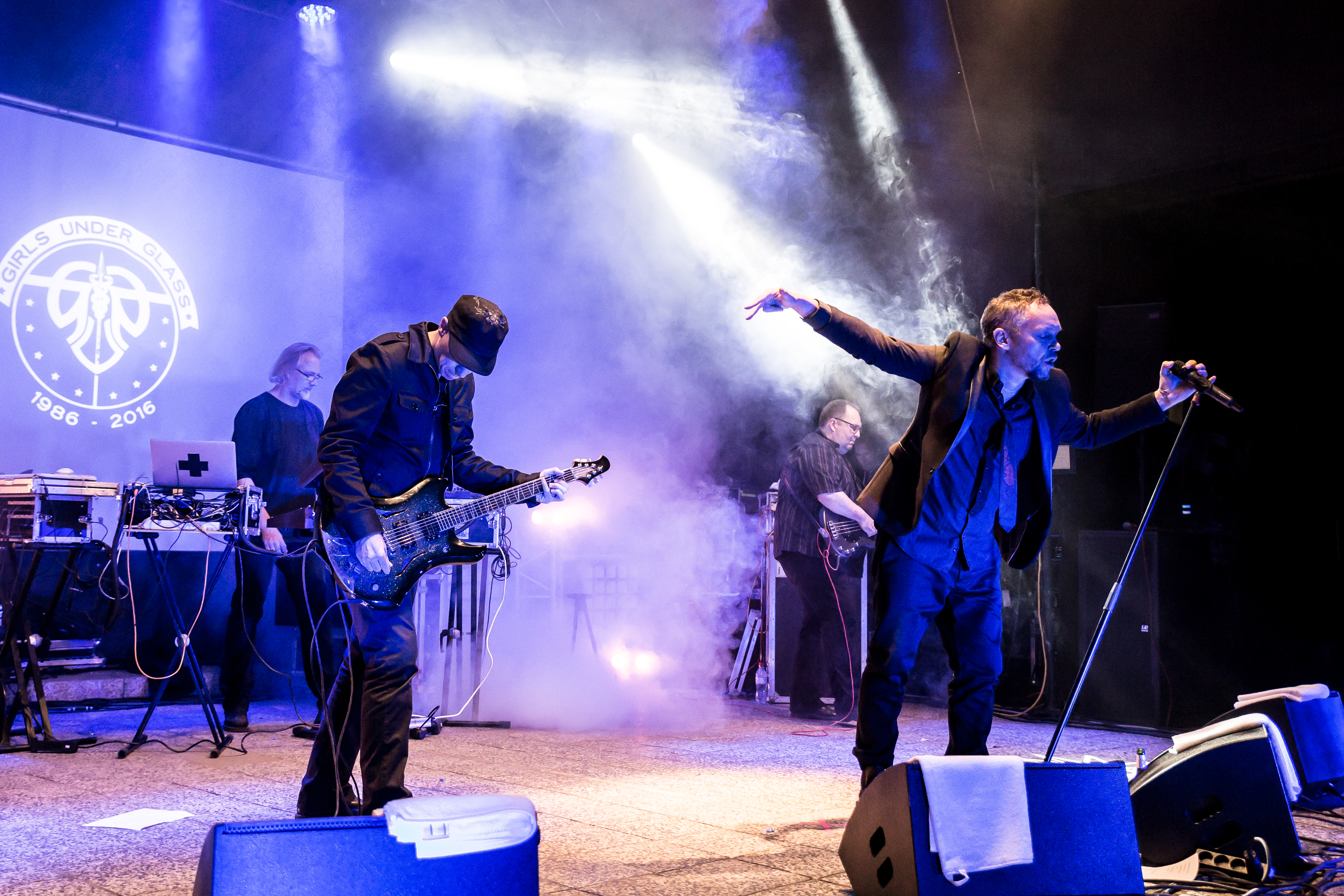
- Girls Under Glass in 2017

Background information
- Origin: Hamburg, Germany
- Genres: Darkwave, electro-industrial, gothic rock; trance (in side projects)
- Years active: 1986–present
- Label: Cellar Door
- Members: Volker "Zaphor" Zacharias (vocals/guitar); Axel Ermes (bass)
- Past members: Hauke Harms (electronics/keyboards); Thomas Lücke (vocals); Lars Baumgardt; Raj Sen Gupta (guitar)

Girls Under Glass (GUG) is a musical group from Hamburg, Germany, founded in 1986 by Thomas Lücke, Hauke Harms, and Volker "Zaphor" Zacharias. Described as "an indispensable part of the German wave and gothic scene", GUG began as a gothic rock band, but quickly crossed genre boundaries, incorporating metal and electronic music of various kinds. They have generally been classified as a darkwave act, but have ranged across the goth–industrial "dark music" spectrum, including into industro-metal, and their work has integrated elements of pop, techno, and trip hop. Grenzwellen-News wrote of the band: "Even after 20 years, it is almost impossible to define and pin-down Girls Under Glass stylistically." A review in 2001 concluded that "even in its most experimental phases, the band has never lost its identity".

Axel Ermes joined in 1989, and Lücke left the next year, but rejoined in 2016; Harms retired in 2017. The band's lyrical material is sometimes in German, sometimes English, or a mixture of both on some tracks. Trauma, a Zaphor and Harms side project, is primarily trance with new age influences, and Traum-B (Harms and Ermes) produced Goa trance and psy-trance. GUG formed as a replacement for an earlier gothic–wave band, Calling Dead Red Roses, which formed in 1985, produced one album, then splintered.

== 1980s ==
Hauke Harms, Thomas Lücke, Torsten Hammann, and Roland Weers formed the gothic-wave band Calling Dead Red Roses in Hamburg in 1985, released the album 1985 (on LP and CD) on Dark Star Records, then split up before the year was out. The album was reissued on the same label in 1991.

Girls Under Glass was founded in Hamburg the spring of 1986 by Thomas Lücke (vocals), Hauke Harms (electronics and keyboards), and Volker Zacharias AKA Zaphor (guitar). They gave their first live performance, in the Hamburg discothèque Kir, in May of the same year, and self-produced a demo tape, The Question - The Answer - Pop, which included early, raw versions of songs they would re-record later, including "Humus" and "Armies Walking".

The following year, Girls Under Glass released a track "Tomorrow Evening" (recorded in March 1987 in a live session at the White Noise Studio in Hamburg) on the compilation album Gore Night Show; this was their first vinyl release. Around this time, they also began recording their first proper album, Humus, which was produced by Christian Mevs of the band Slime, and featured a bassist credited as Dr. Fluch. Since no label was willing to produce the album, the band decided to finance it themselves. Humus was completed in 1987, and released in a limited edition of 500 on the label Supersonic Records in March 1988. It sold out, and within two months had been reissued twice (it has since been reissued by Überschall, Dark Star, and Membran). There followed concerts with The Neon Judgement, Attrition, and Fields of the Nephilim. GUG opened for Red Lorry Yellow Lorry in September 1988 at the Independent Festival in Bremen's Schlachthof. The band put out a second self-produced cassette, Girls Under Glass, that year, a collection of demos recorded at Gas-Rec Studio in February 1988 (including a cover of "Body Electric" by Sisters of Mercy) plus two live tracks; content-wise, it is their rarest release (their original demo tape was re-released as a remastered CD). By 1989, they were becoming well known in the German gothic-wave scene.

GUG released a 12-inch single, "Ten Million Dollars", in January 1989 the Überschall label, but it did not meet with commercial success. Live appearances during this period included two guest musicians: Marcel Zürcher (drummer of the post-punk band Abwärts, as well as Schwansee, and Shanghaid Guts), and Olaf von Ridder AKA Olaf O. (bass, 1988–1989).

Flowers, their second full album, was recorded the same year. Regular members of the band at this time were Lücke (vocals), Zaphor (guitars), and Harms (keyboards). Axel Ermes (bass) joined the band and was integrated into the full-time line-up, after working for some time with Zaphor on another project, the German cult band Cancer Barrack (formed by Torsten Hammann with Ermes and others after the demise of Calling Dead Red Roses). Zaphor began to devote more of his time to GUG, though remained in CB as a vocalist for a while.

== 1990s ==
Flowers was released on January 15, 1990, originally on the Hamburg label Collision Records (later on Dark Star and Membran); like the previous releases, it was conventional gothic rock in the style of The Sisters of Mercy and Fields of the Nephilim. Another 12-inch, "Random (Remixed by KMFDM)", was released in support of the album.

Zaphor left Cancer Barrack to concentrated on a third GUG album, Positive, beginning a renewed relationship with Dark Star Records (Calling Dead Red Roses's old label) that was to last through GUG's 1995 releases. But vocalist Thomas Lücke left the band, and Zaphor also had to take over the singer's part. Positive was produced by Rodney Orpheus of The Cassandra Complex, beginning a long-term friendship with Zaphor and Ermes, described as "play[ing] a consistent role" in CC starting in 1990, joining that band's live lineup, and worked with Orpheus for many years, until at least 2012. Positive, released in 1991 (along with a 7-inch single, "Never Go", actually released in late 1990), marked the first stylistic turning point for the band, who increasingly used electronics and worked in some harder industrial rock components. The album was described by Glansost Wave-Magazin as a "hybrid between Revolting Cocks, Cassandra Complex, and The Sisters of Mercy" Project Pitchfork played their first gigs as the opening act on the tour for this album. A guitarist, Mark Wheeler, appears to have been working with the band in live shows around this era.

The fourth LP, Darius (1992), is a multi-layered darkwave album with metal influences, but also some tracks that are almost entirely electronic; it is their most stylistically diverse album. Darius featured a new guitarist, Raj Sen Gupta, and two guest musicians: Markus Giltjes as drummer (formerly of Pink Turns Blue, and then in Project Pitchfork); and Peter Heppner from Wolfsheim, who performed guest vocals on the tracks "Grey in Grey" and "Reach for the Stars" (the latter was also released in an alternative version on the compilation 040 - Hamburg Strikes Back!, and a remix of "Grey in Grey" was used on 1993 on the label sampler Electrocity Vol. 3). Despite the band turning toward a notably more electronic sound, Darius was their first studio work with a real drummer instead of a drum machine.

Trauma, a new age-inflected trance music side project of Zaphor and Harms formed in 1993, recorded Fractal 1 immediately after GUG's Darius, and released it that year on the Machinery Records label (and Futurist in the US). Trauma expressed their "passion for cold electronic music of the 70s ... combined with very new, contemporary elements", and has been compared to a cross between Tangerine Dream and Clock DVA. The impetus for splitting off a side project was Harms' shift of interest to "very spherical, cinematic music" lacking typical song structures, combined with a feeling that the band might just go all-electronic if they did not "clarify and process our electronic influences and roots even more", shunting too ethereal or experimental work into another outlet.

On Christus, in 1993, the GUG returned to the harder sound of Positive, again with Giltjes as drummer and Gupta as guitarist. For the following tour, Gupta was replaced by Robert Wilcocks, of Cobalt 60, Deine Lakaien, and Sleeping Dogs Wake who accompanied the band on tour for the next three years. Gupta may have actually left after the Christus tour; accounts are conflicting.

Multiple producers, including Peter Spilles of Project Pitchfork, helped the Trauma side-project complete its second album, Construct, and an EP, Silent Mission, both in 1994 and again on the Machinery label (distributed by CBM in the US). Spilles contributed musically as well, on the track "Le Chant de Baleine".

A Girls Under Glass EP, Down in the Park (the lead tracking being a cover of that Gary Numan new wave classic) was released in 1994 also. The release shows the band experimenting with various pop and electronica influences. The EP and the 1995 release of Exitus, a 2-CD "Best of" anthology with a pointed title, signaled the end (at least for a while) of the band's gothic and darkwave approach. Crystals & Stones (1995), its "Die Zeit" single (1995), then Firewalker (1997) were all characterized by an increasing admixture of pop, techno, industrial metal, and even trip hop elements.

By Crystals & Stones, GUG had condensed to a trio again (Zaphor, Harms, and Ermes – which would remain the most stable lineup, the "nucleus" of GUG), recording in the band's own new studio. Die Krupps did a remix of the track "Die Zeit", which became a club hit in Germany and was band's first CD-format single. For the tour in support of Crystals & Stones, the group employed Robert Wilcocks again, and picked up drummer Tippi Agogo (a musician from Vancouver who had worked with The Legendary Pink Dots and Skinny Puppy). GUG played its first shows in France and Spain in 1996 with their new sound. The band's hardest-rock record, Firewalker, was recorded in 1997, and was clearly inspired by the industrial metal and electro-industrial music scene, including such bands such as Gravity Kills, KMFDM, Nine Inch Nails, and Stabbing Westward. It was described as their "toughest, most aggressive and uncompromising album to date". Former KMFDM drummer Rudi Naomi joined the live lineup for the tour, with Deathline International (an American–German electro-industrial act often active in San Francisco) as the opening band.

Zaphor's and Harm's Trauma project produced its third and final album, Phase III, in 1998 on the Synthetic Symphony label. Harms and Ermes formed an alternative side project the same year, Traum-B, which produced a single, self-titled Goa trance and psy-trance album, on the B.E.A.C.H. Muskiverlag label.

GUG's Equilibrium (also 1998) was recorded in a calmer style, a short-term return to their more gothic-wave and electro-industrial roots. As the album's name suggests, there was a re-balancing reason for the shift back, similar to that which had led to the side-project: a concern that their new-found enthusiasm for a particular style would drown out everything else, and end the diversity of their output, by having "opened a certain flow a little too far". In 2006, Zaphor reminisced: "we had more or less consciously gone into a dead end. However, this deadlock also showed us what we definitely do not want and where our true strengths lie. Girls Under Glass would have become a metal band if we'd followed the path of Firewalker and gone further.... And that's not really us."

Hauke Harms, in the same much later interview, also indicated he hadn't been happy with the over-produced quality of Firewalker and the work that led up to it, as if the songs were being suppressed, despite it being their most successful album to date:

Our way of writing songs has not changed much since Flowers. Songs from Flowers or Positive could just as well have been on Zyklus [in 2005]; only the packaging of the songs has adapted to the time.... I think the album is very good and it holds some of my personal favorite Girls Under Glass songs, like "The Bitter End", "Burning Eyes", or "Sick of You", which are mostly typical Girls Under Glass songs, just a bit too trashily produced.

Equilibrium was issued by Hall of Sermon records, and re-released in the United States by Van Richter Records in 2006, with three bonus tracks (two unlisted on the liner, and the third a Trauma cover of Kraftwerk's "Radioaktivitat"). The latter label the next year released the anthology Nightmares as both a CD and a digital download, a collection of singles, remixes, B-sides, and covers – many out-of-print and some not previously released, including a dance-oriented cover of the main theme of the 1978 John Carpenter horror film Halloween.

The stylistic veering in this era is thought to have suppressed the band's popularity, while having little effect on GUG's critical reception. Grenzwellen-News wrote in 2006 that Girls Under Glass was "a band which from the beginning was highly praised by critics, and not least by colleagues, but whose image and basic orientation often remained too diffuse and difficult to grasp due to the constant sharp turns."

== 2000s ==
Minddiver was recorded, in 2001, as the first album on the band's own label, Aragon Records. It includes a cover of Madonna's "Frozen". This was released with five other tracks (including a "Wings" remix by Bruno Kramm of Das Ich, featuring vocals by Sandra Bammer of the band Sister My Sister) as a CD single by Aragon Records, and by Van Richter in the US. One review of Minddiver called it "quintessence and departure at the same time", and was impressed with its emotional depth, noting the "return to the power of the driving, compressed, melancholy wave song ... that carried personality, warmth, love, anger, and pain". The "Frozen" single was re-released by Van Richter in an expanded version, including some Trauma bonus tracks and the Firewalker track "The Bitter End" (about 30 minutes of music total), to expose American audiences to more of the band's back-catalogue.

GUG made their first appearance in London, UK, co-headlining the 2001 Gotham Festival with Clan of Xymox and The Fair Sex. A 16-track live album, ...In Light & Darkness, was recorded on their 2002 European tour for Minddiver, and released that year, along with a new single "Erinnerung", all on their Aragon label. The band took a bit over a year off, then wrote new material recorded it in 2004, with producer J. P. Genkel in his Impuls Studio in Hamburg. A collaborative single, with Peter Spilles of Project Pitchfork, "Ohne Dich", appeared in that year on the Dependent Records sub-label Cellar Door (its first release), while the album developed from these session, Zyklus, was released in February 2005 by Metropolis Records, the largest "dark music"-focused label in North America, as well as by Cellar Door in Germany, and Irond in Russia. Zyklus has been described as "a testament to GUG's open mindedness. Rock music was forged with electronic programming and a mixture of English and German lyrics to run through a spectrum of metal to electro to pop without losing sight of any type of fluency. Solid songwriting, intense atmospheres, and outstanding vocals".

A performance and documentary film about the band, Focus: 20 Years, was produced in 2005 and released on DVD in 2006. The new live performances were filmed at the 2005 Wave-Gotik-Treffen (WGT) in Leipzig, one of the world's largest dark music and arts festivals, with around 20,000 annual attendees. A chance meeting backstage between GUG and filmmaker/photographer Jeffrey Delannoy through their common friend Carsten Clatte (frontman of La Casa del Cid and guitarist for Wolfsheim and Goethes Erben) led to the film idea. Delannoy, having seen the band a few times over the years, was enthusiastic about producing the work in such an atmosphere as WGT. The DVD is mostly live performances of material from the album Zyklus, (with Peter Spilles as a guest for a performance of "Ohne Dich"). GUG also provided archival material for production (after putting out a request to fans for footage they shot), and the release includes a retrospective of their work, interviews with band members, reactions from other artists like Spilles, Ronan Harris (VNV Nation), Rodney Orpheus (The Cassandra Complex), and departed co-founder Thomas Lücke, plus backstage footage, and other bonus materials, running to a total of over three hours. The new live footage is their entire WGT show, in 5.1 surround sound. In a Grenzwellen-News interview the same year, Zaphor was philosophical about the band's lack of great commercial success, but consistent fan-base and critical reception:

I think the unifying element is the fact that so far we have never had the great success that would have led us to pay attention in production to serving a particular audience, or being under pressure to spend a certain amount of money because the record company has invested a lot in advance. We have always escaped these commercial pliers.... This situation gives us great artistic freedom and the ability to redefine Girls Under Glass.... I cannot say that I have anything to do with the gothic scene, so it's very easy to integrate new musical influences into the music. And this openness has always been our strength. We were never a scene band, so never had identity problems.

Throughout the rest of the 2000s and into the 2010s, Girls Under Glass made sporadic live appearances at various festivals, often as a different trio of Zaphor, Ermes, and Baumgardt. MusicMight reports that a female vocalist named Jenny Kähler was also working with the band, probably some time in this era.

== 2010s until recent years ==
Both Zacharis and Ermes were working as of 2012 with Rodney Orpheus and Andy Booth on a post-Cassandra Complex project. Together they released a new Cassandra Complex album "Plague" in May 2022.

In 2016, 30 years after the band was founded, Girls Under Glass included all members of its original line-up for the first time in more than two decades. This appears to have begun spontaneously at a live show on 7 May 2016 in the Markthalle in Hamburg, when original co-founder Tom Lücke, in the audience, was invited onto the stage – 26 years after the singer left the band – to sing a Humus through Flowers-era block of songs. This re-formed crew released a vinyl-only remaster of their original demo, for old-time fans, and performed additional, planned shows in 2016 and 2017, including at WGT 2016 and at NCN Festival 2017, with the line-up consisting of Volker Zaphor Zacharias, Ermes, Harms, and Lücke, plus the band's longtime companion Lars Baumgardt on electric guitar.

At the end of 2017, co-founding member Hauke Harms left the band with two farewell concerts, in Bremen and Berlin. GUG played the Amphi Festival on 29 July 2018, after releasing an online-only single on 13 July, "Endless Nights" (produced by Benjamin Lawrenz and Chris Harms of Lords of the Lost) – their first brand-new material since Zyklus and "Touch Me" in 2005. A complete and remastered collection of Trauma tracks was also released in 2018 as a downloadable album, Digital Anthology, on the Van Richter label. German music news site MonkeyPress described the work as "punchy, dark rock that let's your feet rock right away". After playing a few festivals show with the original singer Tom Luecke, focussing on the early (80s) period the band is now back on the floor with brandnew material! The new album "Backdraft" will by released by Dependend Records by end of 2022 as Vinyl and 2CD Artbook.

== Other work ==
Volker "Zaphor" Zacharias (under a variety of names, including V.Z., V. Zaphor, Zacharias, and others) has also been involved with The Cassandra Complex (since 1990), Still Silent (with Mindy Kumbaleks of Goethes Erben), Rec (with Peter Spilles of Project Pitchfork and York Eysel of Love Like Blood), Seasurfer, and a parody band, Hilfsorganisation Eigener Label Promotion (H.E.L.P.). Axel Ermes has also recorded with The Cassandra Complex, Nefkom (with Markus Reinhard of Wolfsheim), Neustart (with Christoph from the band Stalin), Rec, and Bhambhamhara. Short-term member and later return-collaborator Lars Baumgardt has long worked with De/Vision both as a tour guitarist and a studio session musician, though is not a formal band member.

Although both Ermes and Zaphor were early members of Cancer Barrack, their involvement ended before that band's first album was recorded in 1991.

== Discography ==
- 1986 – The Question – The Answer – Pop (demo, cassette)
- 1988 – Humus (LP, CD)
- 1989 – "Ten Million Dollars" (12″ single)
- 1990 – Flowers (LP, CD)
- 1990 – "Random" (12" single)
- 1991 – Positive (LP, CD)
- 1991 – "Never Go" (7″ single)
- 1991 – Live at Soundgarden (live; LP, CD)
- 1992 – Darius (LP, CD)
- 1993 – Christus (LP, CD)
- 1994 – Down in the Park (EP; CD)
- 1995 – Exitus: 1986–1995 (anthology; 2-CD)
- 1995 – "Die Zeit" (CD single)
- 1995 – Crystals & Stones (CD)
- 1997 – Firewalker (CD)
- 1999 – Nightmares (anthology; CD)
- 1999 – Equilibrium (CD)
- 2001 – Minddiver (CD)
- 2001 – "Frozen" (promo CD single)
- 2002 – "Erinnerung" (CD single)
- 2003 – ...In Light & Darkness (live; 2-CD)
- 2004 – "Ohne Dich" (feat. Peter Spilles) (CD single)
- 2005 – Zyklus (CD)
- 2005 – "Touch Me" (CD single)
- 2006 – Focus: 20 Years (live and documentary DVD)
- 2006 – Traumatized (joint GUG/Trauma remastered anthology; digital album)
- 2014 – Frozen (joint GUG/Trauma anthology; digital EP)
- 2016 – The Question – The Answer – Pop (remastered re-release; LP)
- 2018 – "Endless Nights" (digital single)
- 2023 – "Backdraft" (digital album)

=== Trauma releases ===
- 1993 – Fractal I (CD)
- 1994 – Construct (CD)
- 1994 – Silent Mission (EP, CD)
- 1998 – Phase III (LP, CD)
- 2006 – Girls Under Glass, Traumatized (joint GUG/Trauma remastered anthology; digital album)
- 2014 – Girls Under Glass, Frozen (joint GUG/Trauma anthology; digital EP)
- 2018 – Digital Anthology (remastered anthology; digital album)

=== Traum-B releases ===
- 1999 – Traum-B (CD)

=== Calling Dead Red Roses release ===
- 1985 – 1985 (LP, CD)
