= Deutsches Filmorchester Babelsberg =

German symphony orchestra and music studio

German Film Orchestra Babelsberg
- Orchestra
- Native name: Deutsches Filmorchester Babelsberg
- Short name: DFOB
- Former name: Ufa-Sinfonieorchester (1918)
- Founded: 1918; 108 years ago
- Location: Potsdam, Germany
- Principal conductor: Scott Lawton
- Website: Official website

The German Film Orchestra Babelsberg (also known as Deutsches Filmorchester Babelsberg or DFOB in German) is a symphony orchestra and music studio based in Potsdam, Germany.

== History ==
It was founded in 1918 as Ufa-Sinfonieorchester. Following World War II, the orchestra survived virtually unscathed. It was able to continue its work at the old location in Babelsberg in 1946 with the founding of East German Deutsche Film Aktiengesellschaft (DEFA) as the DEFA music department's own studio orchestra. Almost all of DEFA's productions were recorded with the orchestra, including film classics such as Wolfgang Staudte's The Murderers Are Among Us (1946), Heiner Carow's The Legend of Paul and Paula (1973), Peter Schamoni's Spring Symphony (1983) and all episodes of the Deutscher Fernsehfunk TV series Polizeiruf 110.

The orchestra was re-established in 1993 by Klaus Peter Beyer under its current name. The orchestra derives its name from the legendary Babelsberg Studios in Potsdam-Babelsberg, a city part of Potsdam today, where notable films such as Metropolis, Dr. Mabuse, The Blue Angel, Inglorious Basterds and Bridge of Spies were produced.

The Film Orchestra frequently presents live performances of silent films and other concerts and is very active in recording music for the television, gaming, music and film industries. Additionally, the orchestra has collaborated over 800 times collaborates with prominent artists in popular and jazz music on crossover projects. It has worked with artists like Shania Twain (Up!), Celine Dion (A New Day Has Come) and Bryan Adams (Colour Me Kubrick). It appeared on several albums the German Metal Band Rammstein, like "Mutter" (2001), "Reise, Reise"(2004) and "Liebe ist für alle da" (2009), and several Max Richter Albums. It has also worked with the German Progressive Rock Band Karat on its 1997 album "Balance" and its live album "25 Jahre Karat" (25 Years of Karat, 2001). In 2012 the Orchestra took part in creation of sixth Avantasia's studio album "The Mystery of Time". In 2015 it backed Ronan Harris on VNV Nation's Resonance: Music For Orchestra Vol. 1, which was a No. 7 hit in Germany, on the mainstream GfK Entertainment Charts.

The German Film Orchestra Babelsberg appears on more than 1.000 film productions, such as "Arlo the Alligator Boy", "Ad Astra", "Tides", "Love, Death & Robots", "Sleepless", "Timeless", "Alone in Berlin", Hitman: Agent 47", Escobar: Paradise Lost", "Hector and the Search for Happiness", "The Hundred-Year-Old Man Who Climbed Out of the Window and Disappeared", "The Congress", "Anonymous", "Little Big Panda", Ninja Assassin", Laura´s Star" and "Snow White".

The orchestra also produces music for computer games, like "Balan Wonderworld" and "Final Fantasy: Brave Exvius".

From 1993 the studios of the orchestra were located in the former radio quarters of the GDR, at Nalepastraße in Oberschöneweide, Berlin. In December, 2007 the orchestra was able to move "back to the roots" in Babelsberg, into a building in the area of Film Studio Babelsberg.

The German Film Orchestra's current Chief Conductor is Scott Lawton, who assumed his post in 1999. The former conductor was Frank Strobel.
