= Empires (VNV Nation album) =

Studio album by VNV Nation
- Released: 25 October 1999 (EU); 16 May 2000 (US)
- Recorded: August–September 1999
- Studio: Polaris Studios, Hoxton, London
- Genre: Futurepop, electro-industrial
- Length: 50:58
- Label: Dependent/Metropolis

VNV Nation chronology
Praise the Fallen (1998)	Empires (1999)	Futureperfect (2002)

Singles from Empires
- 1. "Darkangel" Released: 28 June 1999; 2. "Standing" Released: 3 April 2000

Professional ratings
Review scores
Source	Rating
Allmusic	4/5 stars
Almost Cool	(7.5/10)
Metal.de	8/10 stars
Release Magazine	9/10 stars

Empires is the third studio album by the alternative electronic band VNV Nation. It was released in 1999 in the EU and 2000 in the United States jointly under the Metropolis and Dependent labels. The album combines trance, synthpop, and electronic body music (EBM).

"Darkangel" was released as a single on 28 June prior to the album, and "Standing" became a single, and was also released as part of the Burning Empires EP in 2000.

The U.S. release of Empires peaked at #6 on the CMJ RPM Charts.

== Background and composition ==
In a retrospective on the band's website, Ronan Harris has described the creation of the album as "unforgettable" and "intense"; as he was still only doing music in his spare time, he would spend time in the studio after work hours and on weekends. He also described the experience as "deeply emotional":

"Empires" was written at a time in my life when events of the previous years had left me feeling lost and lacking direction. It was an artificial light to guide me. When I say to someone that this album was my salvation, I don't mean that lightly. The track Arclight gets its symbolic title from the first use of electricity in lighthouses, where carbon arc lighting created the most intensely bright artificial light yet seen.

== Track listing ==
No.	Title	Length
1.	"Firstlight"	2:10
2.	"Kingdom"	5:51
3.	"Rubicon"	6:20
4.	"Saviour"	6:59
5.	"Fragments"	5:02
6.	"Distant (Rubicon II)"	3:15
7.	"Standing"	5:40
8.	"Legion"	5:11
9.	"Darkangel"	5:28
10.	"Arclight"	5:00

== Equipment ==
The following equipment was used to compose and produce the album:

- Ensoniq ASR-10
- ARP 2600
- SCI Pro One
- Oberheim OB-1
- Access Virus
- E-mu Proteus 2000
- Roland JV-1080
- Roland M-OC1
- Korg Trinity Rack
