= Praise the Fallen =

Studio album by VNV Nation
- Released: 2 June 1998; 20 May 1999 (US)
- Genre: Futurepop; EBM
- Length: 60:52
- Label: Wax Trax!/TVT

VNV Nation chronology
Advance and Follow (1995)	Praise the Fallen (1998)	Empires (1999)

Singles from Praise the Fallen
- 1. "Solitary" Released: 14 September 1998; 2. "Honour 2003" Released: 10 June 2003

Professional ratings
Review scores
Source	Rating
Allmusic	2/5 stars
Almost Cool	7/10 stars

Praise the Fallen (also known as PTF2012) is the second studio album by the alternative electronic band VNV Nation, released in 1998. It is a departure from their debut album’s sound, featuring better production values, being more melodic, and containing a heavier electronic pace. "Solitary" was released as an EP, and "Honour" was re-recorded in 2003 and released as a single. The album peaked at #94 on the CMJ Radio 200 and #29 on the CMJ RPM Charts in the U.S.

== Track listing ==
No.	Title	Length
1.	"Chosen"	4:21
2.	"Joy"	5:52
3.	"Procession"	5:23
4.	"Voice"	6:12
5.	"Forsaken"	4:49
6.	"Ascension"	8:15
7.	"Honour"	6:41
8.	"Burnout"	3:32
9.	"Solitary"	7:29
10.	"PTF2012"	3:06
11.	"Schweigeminute"	1:00
12.	"Untitled" (bonus track)	4:12
Total length:		60:52

== Notes ==
- “PTF2012” was originally thought to be a reference to the Mayan Calendar doomsday, 21 December 2012. Although in the booklet for Reformation 1 Ronan Harris states that the date was chosen at random.
- “Schweigeminute” is just one minute of silence.
- On “Forsaken”, The first line; "For thirty years, I have plotted to bring down the party. I am sick in mind and body" is a direct reference from the movie adaption of George Orwell's 1984. The last line in the song “If you’re frightened of dying, and you’re holding on — you’ll see devils tearing your life away. If you made your peace — then the devils are really angels, freeing you from the Earth” is from the movie Jacob’s Ladder and is spoken by Danny Aiello.
- Ronan Harris often refers to Praise the Fallen as a way of self-help through a difficult time of his life — in particular the track “Forsaken”, of which a vocal version was recorded for Solitary EP. This version, when sung live, is an emotional experience for Ronan, and he has been known to break down in tears.
