= Pride and Fall =

Norwegian band

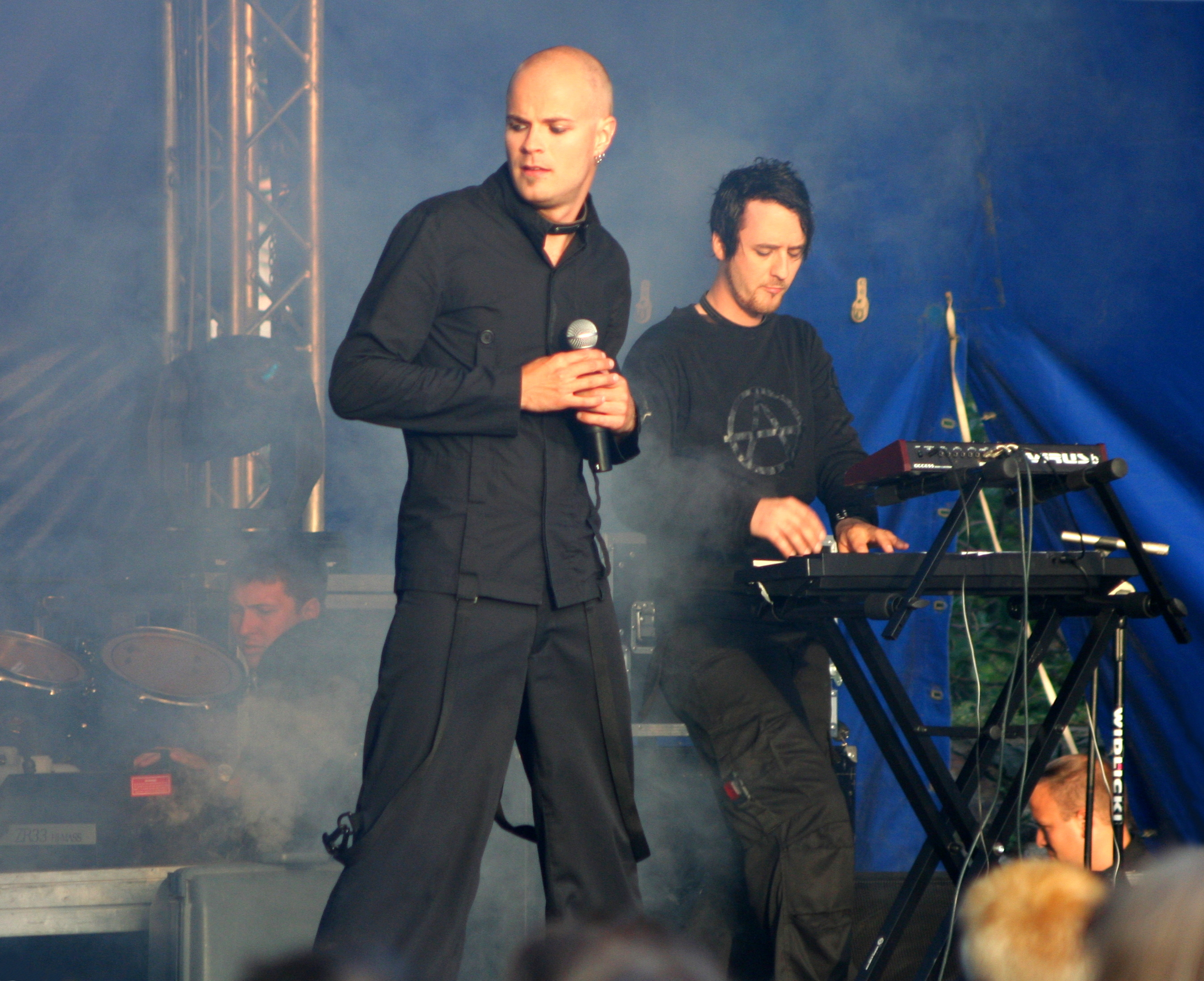
- Pride and Fall at Castle Party 2007 in Bolków

Background information
- Origin: Stavanger, Norway
- Genres: Futurepop, dark wave
- Instrument(s): Synthesizer, drum machine, guitar
- Years active: 2000–present
- Labels: Dependent
- Members: Sigve Monsen, Per Waagen, Svein Joar Auglænd Johnsen

Pride and Fall is a Norwegian futurepop act from Stavanger, Norway, formed in 2000 by Sigve Monsen, Per Waagen, and Svein Joar A. Johnsen.

== History ==
The band came about when Sigve and Svein wanted to pursue a more electronic and club-oriented sound than what they were doing in their goth/dark wave project, An Evening with Kisses. As a result, they formed Pride and Fall together with Per Waagen in 2000–2001. Waagen had worked with Monsen in the 1990s in a doom metal band from Stavanger called Vidvandre. Vidvandre also featured Frank Claussen who later joined the successful Theatre of Tragedy.

Pride and Fall released a demo shortly after, and released their debut album, Nephesh in 2003, and debut single "Paragon" on Dependent Records in Europe, Metropolis Records in the United States, and Memento Materia in Scandinavia. Pride and Fall performed their first shows outside of Norway in 2004, including Cyberia/X-Club in the Netherlands, the Invitation Festival in Belgium, and the Dark City Festival in Scotland.

In late 2005, the band released their second single, the web-only "Border", and in 2006, their second album Elements of Silence. The Dependent version of the CD contained a live version of the song "December" as a pregap hidden track. "Border" peaked at #6 on the German Alternative Charts (DAC), ranking #36 on the DAC Top Singles of 2006. The band toured the UK in May 2006 supporting Covenant on their short UK SkyShaper tour. They also performed at the now-relocated Edwards No.8 in Birmingham, The Liquid Room in Edinburgh, Corporation in Sheffield, and Islington Academy in London.

The band released their third album, In My Time of Dying, on August 17, 2007, which was at the time their final album on Dependent, as the label planned to close their business due to illegal downloading of the music they promote. As of September 15, 2007, In My Time of Dying ranked #1 in the German Alternative Charts, and the limited edition digipak sold out. In 2011, Pride and Fall started working on a new album for release in early 2013. The album was released on Dependent Records, as the label reopened in 2009 and began to release physical CDs again in partnership with Metropolis Records. This release named Of Lust and Desire is the group's fourth studio album, and was followed up with an EP entitled Turn the Lights On in 2014.

In 2016, Pride and Fall released their fifth album Red for the Dead, Black for the Mourning.

That same year, the band performed at the 25th annual Wave-Gotik-Treffen on May 15, 2016.

== Discography ==
=== Albums ===
- Nephesh (2003, Dependent/Metropolis)
- Elements of Silence (2006, Dependent/Metropolis)
- In My Time of Dying (2007, Dependent)
- Of Lust and Desire (2013, Dependent/Metropolis)
- Red for the Dead, Black for the Mourning (2016, Dependent)

=== Singles ===
- "Paragon" (2003, Dependent/Metropolis)
- "Border" (2005, Dependent)
- "Violence" (2006, Dependent)
- "Turn the Lights On" (2014, Dependent)

=== Promo ===
- Pride and Fall EP (2001)
