= Noire (album) =

Studio album by VNV Nation
- Released: 12 October 2018 (Europe); 7 December 2018 (US)
- Recorded: 2018
- Studios: Anachron, Hamburg
- Genres: Electronic, synthpop, futurepop, trance
- Length: 73:15
- Labels: Anachron Sounds (Europe), Metropolis Records (US)
- Producer: Ronan Harris

VNV Nation chronology
Resonance (2015)	Noire (2018)	Electric Sun (2023)

Singles from Noire
- 1. "When Is the Future?" Released: 8 October 2018

Noire is the tenth studio album by the Irish alternative electronic band VNV Nation, released on 12 October 2018, in Europe under Anachron Sounds, and on 7 December 2018, in America under Metropolis Records. The single "When Is the Future?" was a major hit for the band and also well received. The song "Collide" was used as the theme song for the 2023 video game Firmament.

== Reception ==
Professional ratings
Review scores
Source	Rating
AllMusic	4/5 stars
Electrozombies	3/5 stars
Reflections of Darkness	7/10 stars
Release Magazine	8/10 stars
Musik Reviews	12/15 stars
Terrorverlag	9/10 stars

Electrozombies International Synthpop Magazine's Annika Autzen wrote "Ronan Harris’ melancholic and calm voice leads the listener through very dark places, where opposing forces such as light and darkness, peace and war, life and death, love and hate are intertwined in an eternal conflict. The religious implications in the lyrics add to this somber atmosphere and make listening to the 13 songs an almost transcendental experience."

Release Music Magazine's Johan Carlsson wrote "Ronan sings better than ever, solemnly painting a picture of a dark future, and some tracks have melodies that just get stuck in your head and twirl around for hours. [...] Ronan manages to wring a lot of emotion and beauty from his machine park, which is no small feat."

== Promotion ==
=== Tour ===
Noire was followed by the Noire tour, with the first European leg starting in Germany on 12 October 2018, the same day as the release of Noire, and ending in Denmark on 3 November 2018. The American leg of the tour started on 16 November 2018 and ended on 15 December 2018. The second and final European leg started in Sweden on 24 January 2019 and ended in Russia on 3 March 2019.

=== Marketing ===
The song "When Is the Future?" was supported by the release of a music video, which was the first official VNV Nation music video. The video was filmed on location in Tokyo in Autumn 2018 and directed by Michael and Flora Winkler. It released on 8 October 2018.

== Track listing ==
All songs written and composed by Ronan Harris.

No.	Title	Length
1.	"A Million"	6:29
2.	"Armour"	4:13
3.	"God of All"	5:26
4.	"Nocturne No.7"	6:10
5.	"Collide"	6:40
6.	"Wonders"	5:40
7.	"Immersed"	6:24
8.	"Lights Go Out"	4:03
9.	"Guiding"	5:47
10.	"When Is the Future?"	5:11
11.	"Only Satellites"	5:18
12.	"Requiem for Wires"	4:44
13.	"All Our Sins"	7:10
Total length:		73:15

== Personnel ==
VNV Nation

- Ronan Harris – vocals, programming

Additional performers

- Conrad Oleak - orchestral programming on "All Our Sins" outro
- Szymon Jakubowski - piano on "Nocturne No.7"

== Charts ==
Chart (2011)	Peak position
Austrian Albums (Ö3 Austria)	49
Belgian Albums (Ultratop Flanders)	151
German Albums (Offizielle Top 100)	4
Swiss Albums (Schweizer Hitparade)	54
