= Judgement (VNV Nation album) =

Studio album by VNV Nation
- Released: (United Kingdom) 5 April 2007 (United States) 10 April 2007
- Recorded: Winter 2006–2007 at the Soundfactory, Hamburg, Germany
- Genre: Futurepop, electropop, acid techno
- Length: 51:56
- Label: Metropolis; Anachron

VNV Nation chronology
Matter + Form (2005)	Judgement (2007)	Reformation 1 (2009)

Professional ratings
Review scores
Source	Rating
Allmusic	3.5/5 stars
Release Magazine	8/10 stars

Judgement is the sixth studio album by the Irish alternative electronic band VNV Nation, released in 2007.

It charted at no. 55 in the mainstream German charts, charting for 3 weeks.

== Track listing ==
No.	Title	Length
1.	"Prelude"	4:08
2.	"The Farthest Star"	4:53
3.	"Testament"	6:14
4.	"Descent"	4:25
5.	"Momentum"	6:15
6.	"Nemesis"	4:30
7.	"Secluded Spaces"	5:54
8.	"Illusion"	4:47
9.	"Carry You"	6:12
10.	"As It Fades"	4:38
Total length:		51:56

== Info ==
- Music and lyrics by Ronan Harris
- Tracks 2–9 produced by Ronan Harris and Andre Winter
- Tracks 1 and 10 produced and mixed by Ronan Harris
- Tracks 2–9 mixed by Ronan Harris, Sven Heine, Lutz Rahn and Andre Winter
- Mastered by Chris Gehringer at Sterling Sound, New York City
- Published by AMV Talpa
- Artwork by Michał Karcz

== Track descriptions ==
"Illusion" was used successfully on a YouTube video paired with the work by artist Andrew Huang until it was taken down due to confusion by viewers who thought Mr. Huang had plagiarized the music. Five months after its release the song gained attention in the UK by being dedicated to Sophie Lancaster, the victim of mob attack murder. The song also appears during the end credits of Hellblade: Senua's Sacrifice.

== Equipment used ==
- Modular systems: Modcan System B, Dotcom Orgon, Arp 2600
- Analogue and hardware synths: Roland SH-2, Roland TB-303, Dave Smith Polyevolver, Creamwave Noah
- Computer and software: Apple Powermac G5, Logic Audio Pro 7.2, Sculpture, EXS24, Spectrasonics Atmosphere, Stylus RMX, Timewarp 2600, TC Powercore Virus, Native Instruments Reaktor 5, Native Instruments Battery 2, MOTU Symphonic Instrument
