= Maclaine Diemer =

American multimedia music composer

- Occupation: Composer
- Years active: 2009–present
- Labels: Materia Collective, Emperia Records
- Website: maclainediemer.com

Maclaine Diemer is an American multimedia music composer. He worked on sound design and composing music for the Rock Band game series, and massively multiplayer online game (MMO) Guild Wars 2.

== Early life ==
Diemer started playing guitar when he was 12. He enjoyed listening to the classic rock music genre with his parents, namely the Beatles, Jimi Hendrix and Led Zeppelin. During his older years, Diemer enjoyed listening to Van Halen and The Beach Boys.

Diemer studied music at the Berklee College of Music in Boston, and graduated in 2003.

== Career ==
In June 2008, Diemer started working as a sound designer and composer at Harmonix Music Systems for 2 years. During this time, he worked on sound design and composing music for many of Harmonix's games. He worked on The Beatles: Rock Band, Rock Band 2, and Rock Band 3. Diemer left Harmonix in July 2010 to work at ArenaNet.

In July 2010, Diemer joined the ArenaNet team as a sound designer for the game Guild Wars 2, and later in 2012 he became the company's lead composer for the game. During his time as lead composer, he worked on soundtracks for Guild Wars 2's Living World Season 1, Living World Season 2, Guild Wars 2: Heart Of Thorns, Living World Season 3, Guild Wars 2: Path Of Fire, and Living World Season 4.

In April 2019, Diemer stepped down as lead composer at ArenaNet to pursue other projects. However, he is still writing music for Guild Wars 2.

In July 2022, Diemer joined Cyan Worlds as the composer for the adventure game Firmament.

== Musical style and influences ==
Diemer's influences include John Williams in the Star Wars franchise, Jerry Goldsmith in the Star Trek franchise, Howard Shore in Lord of the Rings, and Bernard Herman.

While working on Living World Season 2 for Guild Wars 2, Diemer wanted to record some of the soundtracks in a live orchestra. He collaborated with Dynamedion to record the music in Berlin, Budapest, and Seattle. The music for the announcement trailer for Guild Wars 2: Heart of Thorns was also composed in a live orchestra.

== Legacy ==
The music that Diemer and Lena Raine composed for Guild Wars 2: Heart of Thorns was played in a live orchestra by The Evergreen Philharmonic Orchestra. The Orchestra involved many students from Issaquah High School, and they played multiple soundtracks featured in Heart of Thorns.

== Ludography ==
- Rock Band 2 (2008)
- The Beatles: Rock Band (2009)
- Rock Band 3 (2010)
- Guild Wars 2 (2012)
- Guild Wars 2: Heart of Thorns (2015)
- Guild Wars 2: Path of Fire (2017)
- Crucible (2020)
- Guild Wars 2: End of Dragons (2022)
- Firmament (2023)
- Guild Wars 2: Secrets of the Obscure (2023)
- Guild Wars 2: Janthir Wilds (2024)
- Wildgate (2025)

== Awards ==
Year	Award	Category	Work	Contribution
2009	Game Audio Network Guild	Best use of licensed music	Rock Band 2	Composer & Sound Design
2010	Game Audio Network Guild	Best use of licensed music	The Beatles: Rock Band	Composer & Sound Design
2011	Academy of Interactive arts & sciences	Outstanding achievement in soundtrack	Rock Band 3	Composer & Sound Design
2012	IGN	Best PC Game	Guild Wars 2	Sound Design
2012	IGN	Best MMO	Guild Wars 2	Sound Design
2015	Ten Ton Hammer	Game of the year	Guild Wars 2	Lead Composer
2019	Techradar	Best MMOs in 2019	Guild Wars 2	Lead Composer
