= Electric Sun (album) =

Studio album by VNV Nation
- Released: 28 April 2023
- Recorded: 2023
- Studios: Anachron, Hamburg
- Length: 63:32
- Labels: Anachron Sounds (Europe); Metropolis (US)
- Producer: Ronan Harris

VNV Nation chronology
| Noire (2018) | Electric Sun (2023) | Construct (2025) |

Electric Sun is the eleventh studio album by the Irish alternative electronic band VNV Nation. It was released on 28 April 2023, in Europe under Anachron Sounds and in America under Metropolis.

== Track listing ==
All tracks are written by Ronan Harris.

| No. | Title | Length |
|---|---|---|
| 1. | "Electric Sun" | 6:44 |
| 2. | "Before the Rain" (Additionally produced by Andre Winter) | 4:45 |
| 3. | "The Game" | 4:15 |
| 4. | "Invictus" (Additionally produced by Andre Winter) | 4:34 |
| 5. | "Artifice" (Additionally produced by Andre Winter) | 4:56 |
| 6. | "In the Temple" | 4:46 |
| 7. | "Prophet" | 5:42 |
| 8. | "Wait" (Additionally produced by Andre Winter) | 7:27 |
| 9. | "At Horizon's End" (Additionally produced by Andre Winter) | 5:29 |
| 10. | "Run" | 6:24 |
| 11. | "Sunflare" | 5:33 |
| 12. | "Under Sky" | 2:57 |
| Total length: | | 63:32 |

== Personnel ==
VNV Nation

- Ronan Harris – vocals, programming

Production

- Ronan Harris – production, mixing
- Benjamin Mundigler – vocal tracking assistant
- Benjamin Lorenz – mixing and mastering
- Andre Winter – additional production

== Charts ==
Chart performance for Electric Sun
| Chart (2023) | Peak position |
|---|---|
| Austrian Albums (Ö3 Austria) | 54 |
| German Albums (Offizielle Top 100) | 5 |
