= Matter + Form =

Studio album by VNV Nation
- Released: 4 April 2005 (EU)
- Recorded: 2005
- Genre: Futurepop; EBM; Electro-industrial; Electropop
- Length: 55:08
- Label: Metropolis
- Producer: Humate and Ronan Harris

VNV Nation chronology
Futureperfect (2001)	Matter + Form (2005)	Judgement (2007)

Singles from Matter + Form
- 1. "Chrome" Released: 7 March 2005

Professional ratings
Review scores
Source	Rating
Allmusic	3.5/5 stars
Sputnikmusic	4/5 stars

Matter+Form is the fifth studio album by the German-based alternative electronic band VNV Nation, released in 2005. It was co-engineered by German trance DJ Humate (Gerret Frerichs), and Andre Winter. "Chrome" was released as a one-track single.

It charted at no. 38 in the mainstream German charts, charting for 2 weeks.

== Track listing ==
No.	Title	Length
1.	"Intro"	1:27
2.	"Chrome"	4:47
3.	"Arena"	5:44
4.	"Colours of Rain"	4:06
5.	"Strata"	4:00
6.	"Interceptor"	3:25
7.	"Entropy"	5:17
8.	"Endless Skies"	5:55
9.	"Homeward"	5:34
10.	"Lightwave"	7:00
11.	"Perpetual"	7:54
