= Rotersand =

German electronic music act

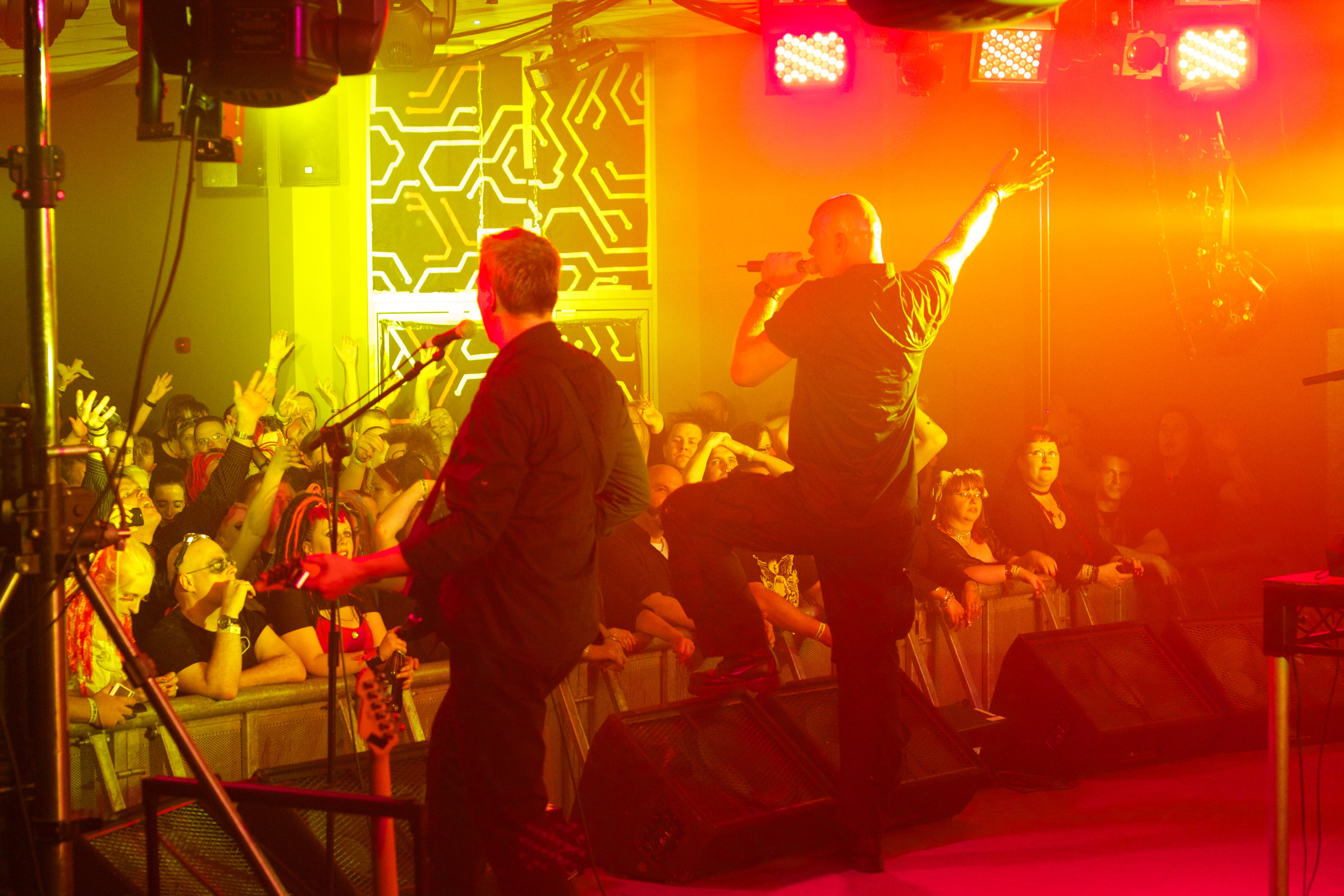
- Rotersand performing at "Infest 2010".

Background information
- Origin: Germany
- Genres: Future Pop, electro, EBM, synthpop
- Years active: 2002–present
- Labels: Metropolis Records; Trisol Music Group
- Members: Rascal Nikov; Krischan Jan-Eric Wesenberg
- Website: www.rotersand.net

Rotersand is a German electronic music act, formed in September 2002 by musician/producer Gun and singer Rascal with dance music producer/DJ Krischan J.E. Wesenberg joining them shortly after. Rotersand's music can generally be described as futurepop; the band themselves refer to it as "industrial pop."

== History ==
Prior to Rotersand, Gun and Rasc had collaborated on various other projects, most notably Gun as one producer and Rasc as one member of the band The Fair Sex. Rotersand's debut release was the 'Merging Oceans' EP in 2003, followed by their debut album Truth Is Fanatic. 'Merging Oceans' peaked at #8 on the German Alternative Charts (DAC) and ranked #72 on the DAC Top Singles of 2003.

In 2005, they released the single 'Exterminate Annihilate Destroy', a precursor to their second album Welcome To Goodbye, both of which reached #1 on the DAC. The 2006 EP, Dare to Live, peaked at #2 on the DAC Singles chart.

The third Rotersand album, 1023, was released in 2007.

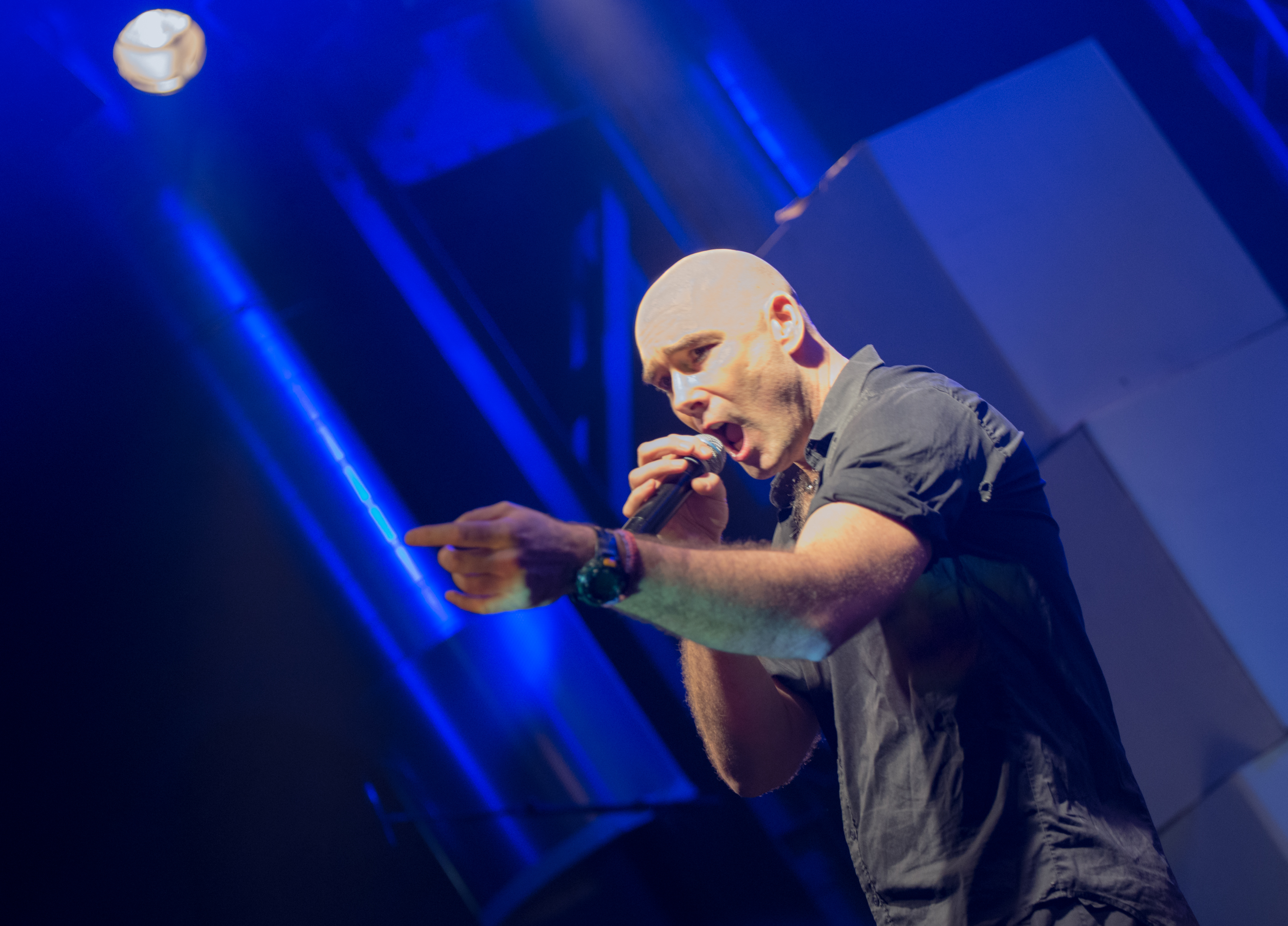
Rascal Nikov @ E-Tropolis 2013

The band has toured Europe with Assemblage 23 and both Europe and the US with Covenant, it played at Dark City Festival and was one of the headlining acts at Infest 2006. Mark Jackson of VNV Nation joined them on stage at the M'era Luna Festival in Hildesheim Germany in August 2006, and the band has appeared six times at the Wave Gotik Treffen.

After the discontinuation of Dependent Records at the start of 2007, the band signed to Trisol Records in 2008 and released the single "I cry", which was taken from the 2007 album '1023'. It also contains a DVD with live and interview material and reached the DAC's No.1 shortly after its release.

However, Rotersand had to cancel live shows in 2007, such as EBM Fest, due to physical exhaustion of lead singer Rasc.

2009 saw the release of the newest Rotersand MCD War On Error a teaser for the band's album Random Is Resistance, which was released in October of that year.

In the following years, Rasc experienced serious health issues, preventing him from singing and causing many Rotersand shows at e.g. Blacksun Festival 2008 and E-Tropolis 2011, to get cancelled. Eventually the band did not accept any more bookings for live shows. Rasc's health also prevented them from recording a new album.

A first new sign of life came in 2014 with the release of the Truth is Fanatic Again remix CD, which also contained the first new Rotersand song (Electric Elephant) in 6 years. On 10 December 2014, Christmas came early with the release of Rotersand's very own Christmas cover song 'You Better not Watch' (as Rotersanta).

In April 2016, a single, Torn Realities, was released, accompanied by a video. On 4 November 2016, the full album CapitalismTM was released.

On 5 July 2019, the single You Know Nothing was released.

== Discography ==
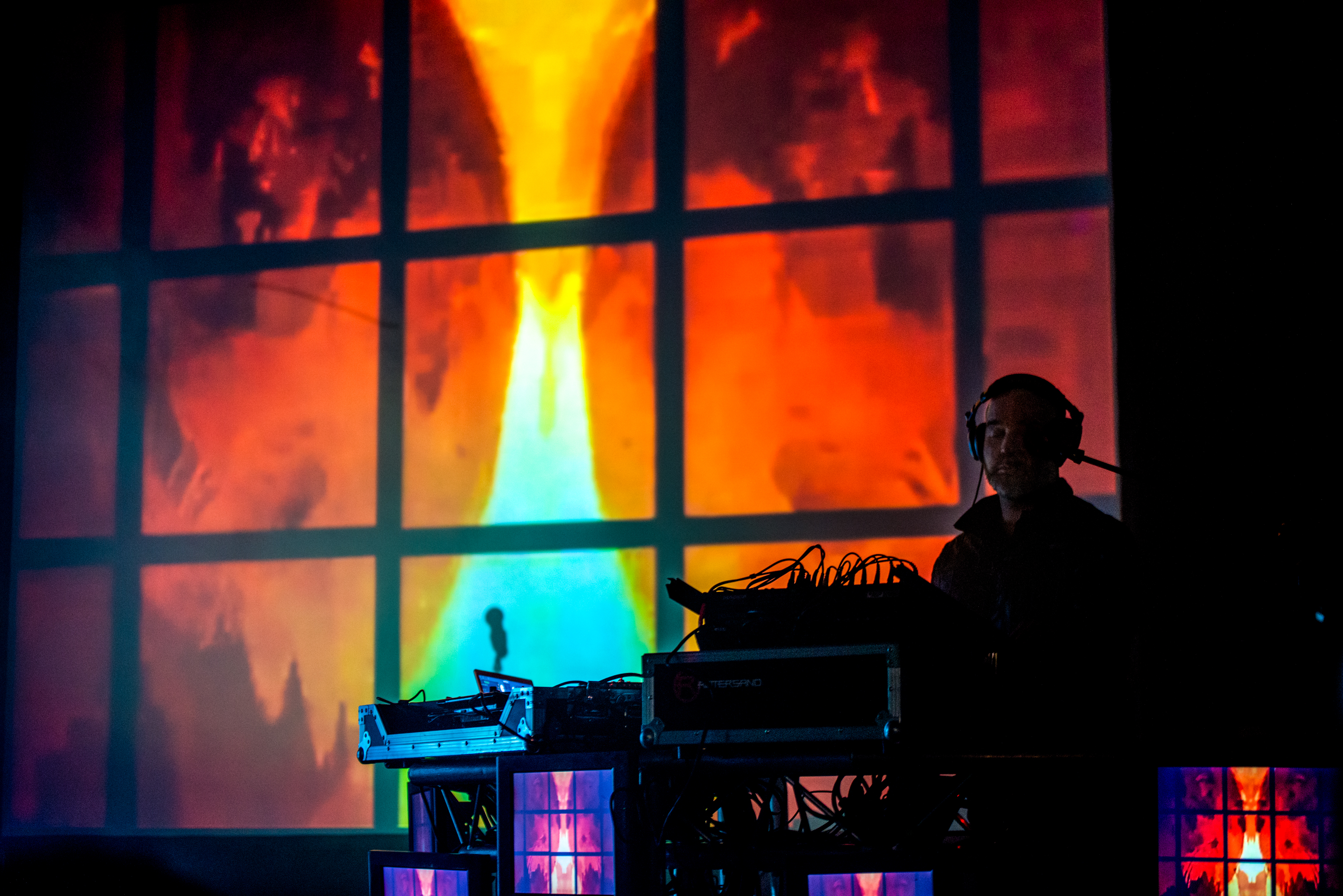
Krischan J. E. Wesenberg on E-Tropolis Festival

Albums

- Truth Is Fanatic (2003)
- Welcome To Goodbye (2005)
- 1023 (2007)
- Random Is Resistance (2009)
- Truth is Fanatic Again (2014)
- CapitalismTM (2016)
- How Do You Feel Today? (2020)
- Don’t Become The Thing You Hated (2025)

EPs

- Merging Oceans (2003)
- Exterminate Annihilate Destroy (2005)
- Dare To Live (2006)
- I Cry EP (2008)
- War On Error (2009)
- Waiting To Be Born (2010)
- Torn Realities (2016)
- You Know Nothing (2019)

=== Limited edition releases ===
- Electronic World Transmission (Limited 2004 Tour EP)
- Social Distortion (Limited 12" vinyl)

== Other sources ==
- Birchmeier, Jason. "Rotersand. Biography". Allmusic.
