= Transnational (VNV Nation album) =

Studio album by VNV Nation
- Released: 11 October 2013 (Europe); 19 November 2013 (US)
- Genre: Electronic, Vocal Trance, Synthpop, Trance, Progressive Trance
- Length: 52:29
- Label: Anachron Sounds

VNV Nation chronology
Automatic (2011)	Transnational (2013)	Resonance (2015)

Transnational is the ninth studio album by the German-based alternative electronic band VNV Nation, released on 11 October 2013 in Europe and on 19 November 2013 in America under Anachron Sounds.

It charted in the mainstream chart in Germany at no. 9 (2 weeks total), in Switzerland at no. 99 (1 week total) and in Belgium at no. 132 (1 week total).

== Track listing ==
All lyrics are written by Ronan Harris; all music is composed by VNV Nation

No.	Title	Length
1.	"Generator"	4:25
2.	"Everything"	5:18
3.	"Primary"	4:31
4.	"Retaliate"	4:37
5.	"Lost Horizon"	5:10
6.	"Teleconnect Pt. 1"	5:52
7.	"If I Was"	5:23
8.	"Aeroscope"	4:44
9.	"Off Screen"	4:20
10.	"Teleconnect Pt. 2"	8:11
Total length:		52:29
