= Reformation 1 =

Reformation 01

Box set by VNV Nation
- Released: (Europe) 24 April 2009 (United States) 12 May 2009
- Genre: Futurepop
- Length: 3:00:24
- Label: Anachron

VNV Nation chronology
Judgement (2007)	Reformation 01 (2009)	Of Faith, Power and Glory (2009)

Professional ratings
Review scores
Source	Rating
Allmusic	4/5 stars

Reformation 01 is a box set by VNV Nation that was released on 24 April 2009 in Europe and 12 May 2009 in North America containing a 12-track live CD, a 13-track bonus disc of remixes and previously unreleased material, and a DVD with 8 videos of live footage recorded from 2005 to 2008. Only 18,000 copies were released worldwide.

It charted at no. 48 in the mainstream German album charts.

== Track listing ==
CD 1: Live
No.	Title	Length
1.	"Joy" (Live)	5:28
2.	"Chrome" (Live)	4:51
3.	"Testament" (Live)	6:13
4.	"Nemesis" (Live)	4:35
5.	"Endless Skies" (Live)	5:55
6.	"Farthest Star" (Live)	5:02
7.	"Procession" (Live)	5:23
8.	"Entropy" (Live)	5:16
9.	"Illusion" (Live)	4:50
10.	"Arena" (Live)	5:41
11.	"Honour 2003" (Live)	6:53
12.	"Perpetual" (Live)	8:45

CD 2: Remixes, Rare & Unreleased
No.	Title	Length
1.	"Chrome" (Modcom Mix)	6:27
2.	"Chrome" ([:SITD:] Mix)	4:59
3.	"Chrome" (Apoptygma Berzerk Remix)	4:44
4.	"Interceptor" (ABM Version by VNV Nation)	5:37
5.	"Nemesis" (S.A.M. Remix)	3:51
6.	"Carry You" (Frozen Plasma Remix)	6:57
7.	"Still Waters" (Unreleased)	7:39
8.	"Suffer" (Unreleased)	7:01
9.	"Precipice" (Unreleased)	5:40
10.	"As it Fades" (2nd Movement)	3:32
11.	"Main Theme" (from Gene Generation)	2:46
12.	"Mayhem" (from Gene Generation)	2:03
13.	"The Lair" (from Gene Generation)	2:58

DVD: Live
No.	Title	Length
1.	"Chrome" (Live)	4:47
2.	"Homeward" (Live)	5:50
3.	"Farthest Star" (Live)	5:15
4.	"Nemesis" (Live)	6:05
5.	"Illusion" (Live)	4:49
6.	"Arena" (Live)	5:24
7.	"Honour 2003" (Live)	6:48
8.	"Perpetual" (Live)	8:57

== Charts ==
Chart performance for Reformation 1
Chart (2009)	Peak position
German Albums (Offizielle Top 100)	48
