= Automatic (VNV Nation album) =

Studio album by VNV Nation
- Released: (Europe) 16 September 2011 (United States) 25 October 2011
- Genre: Futurepop; Electropop
- Length: 56:46
- Label: Anachron

VNV Nation chronology
Of Faith, Power and Glory (2009)	Automatic (2011)	Transnational (2013)

Professional ratings
Review scores
Source	Rating
Allmusic	4.5/5 stars
SoundSphere	4/5 stars
Star Pulse	4/5 stars
COMA Music Magazine	favorable
Release Magazine	7/10 stars

Automatic is the eighth studio album by the alternative electronic artist VNV Nation, released in 2011. It was released on 16 September 2011 in Europe, and 25 October 2011 in North America.

The band describe the album as being quite melodic, except for the track "Control", which is said to be a more club-sounding track. They have even described the album as being their favourite so far.

In the first week of release the album went straight into the German mainstream Media Control charts at number 8, the band's first top ten hit, spending 3 weeks in the chart; no. 66 in Austria, charting for 1 week; no. 77 in Switzerland, charting for 1 week; and no. 50 in Sweden, charting for 1 week. It also went to number 1 in the Deutsche Alternative Charts, a position it occupied for 4 weeks.

"Control" was released as a free-download prior to the album's release. Although not being an official single, "Nova" received radio air-play in Germany.

== Track listing ==
No.	Title	Length
1.	"On-Air"	3:26
2.	"Space & Time"	4:53
3.	"Resolution"	6:14
4.	"Control"	5:50
5.	"Goodbye 20th Century"	4:27
6.	"Streamline"	6:06
7.	"Gratitude"	6:05
8.	"Nova"	6:06
9.	"Photon"	5:52
10.	"Radio"	7:47
Total length:		56:46
