= Of Faith, Power and Glory =

Studio album by VNV Nation
- Released: 19 June 2009
- Genre: Futurepop, electro-industrial, electropop
- Length: 50:33
- Label: Anachron

VNV Nation chronology
Reformation 1 (2009)	Of Faith, Power and Glory (2009)	Automatic (2011)

Singles from Of Faith, Power and Glory science technology
- 1. "The Great Divide"

Professional ratings
Review scores
Source	Rating
AllMusic	4/5 stars
ReGen magazine	3.5/5 stars
Side-line	(mixed)
Sphere Magazine	4/5 stars

Of Faith, Power and Glory is the seventh studio album the German-based alternative electronic band VNV Nation, released on 19 June 2009. As quoted by VNV Nation, it is "soulful and anthemic but yet raw and uncompromising at some points."

It spent two weeks in the mainstream German Media Control charts, peaking at No. 41, and appeared on several Billboard charts in the US.

== Track listing ==
No.	Title	Length
1.	"Pro Victoria"	2:21
2.	"Sentinel"	5:27
3.	"Tomorrow Never Comes"	5:08
4.	"The Great Divide"	5:14
5.	"Ghost"	5:03
6.	"Art of Conflict"	6:39
7.	"In Defiance"	3:43
8.	"Verum Æternus"	6:02
9.	"From My Hands"	4:36
10.	"Where There Is Light"	6:20
Total length:		50:33

== Charts ==
Chart (2009)	Peak position
German Albums (Offizielle Top 100)	41
US Billboard 200	186
US Top Dance Albums (Billboard)	5
US Heatseekers Albums (Billboard)	15
US Independent Albums (Billboard)	33

== Notes ==
-The track Art of Conflict has lyrics from the Art of War by Sun Tzu.
