= Futureperfect =

Studio album by VNV Nation
- Released: 28 January 2002 (EU); 5 March 2002 (US)
- Recorded: Nationhood Studios in Hamburg, Germany
- Genre: Futurepop; Electro-industrial
- Length: 62:28
- Language: English
- Label: dependent
- Producer: Ronan Harris

VNV Nation chronology
Empires (1999)	Futureperfect (2002)	Matter + Form (2005)

Singles from Futureperfect
- 1. "Genesis" Released: 3 September 2001; 2. "Beloved" Released: 25 March 2002

Professional ratings
Review scores
Source	Rating
Allmusic	3/5 stars
Release Magazine	9/10 stars

Futureperfect is the fourth studio album by the German-based electronic band VNV Nation. It was released in Europe on 28 January 2002 and on 5 March 2002 in the United States. It was the first VNV Nation release to be created/produced entirely using software synthesizers. The opening track 'Foreword' samples the Enigma Variations, part IX (Nimrod).

It charted at No. 26 in the mainstream German charts, charting for two weeks.

"Genesis" and "Beloved" were released as singles.

== Track listing ==
No.	Title	Length
1.	"Foreword"	1:53
2.	"Epicentre"	6:25
3.	"Electronaut"	6:35
4.	"Liebestod"	2:54
5.	"Holding On"	4:40
6.	"Carbon"	6:13
7.	"Genesis"	5:46
8.	"Structure"	4:07
9.	"Fearless"	6:16
10.	"4 a.m."	1:50
11.	"Beloved"	7:24
12.	"Airships"	8:18

== Personnel ==
- Ronan Harris: vocals, song-writing, composition and Production

== Release history ==
Region	Date	Label	Format	Catalog
Germany	January 28, 2002	dependent	CD	MIND 039
United States	March 5, 2002	Metropolis	CD	MET 240
Sweden	2002	Energy Rekords	CD	ERCD 151
