= Dependent Records =

German independent record label

- Parent company: Mindbase Strategic Consulting
- Founded: 1999
- Founder: Stefan Herwig, Eskil Simonsson, Johan Van Roy, Bryan Erickson, Ronan Harris
- Distributor(s): Alive Vertrieb und Marketing in der Entertainmentbranche AG
- Genre: Industrial, electro-industrial, futurepop, aggrotech
- Country of origin: Germany
- Location: Gelsenkirchen, North Rhine-Westphalia
- Official website: www.dependent.de

Dependent Records (stylized as dependent) is a German independent record label that mainly focuses on aggrotech, electro-industrial, and futurepop music. The label was founded in January 1999 after the demise of the Off Beat label by former Off Beat A&R manager Stefan Herwig along with Eskil Simonsson (Covenant), Johan Van Roy (Suicide Commando), Bryan Erickson (Velvet Acid Christ), and Ronan Harris (VNV Nation).

Artists that have released music through Dependent Records include Velvet Acid Christ, Suicide Commando, VNV Nation, Covenant, Klinik, Seabound, Apoptygma Berzerk, Dismantled, Ivory Frequency, Pride & Fall, mind.in.a.box, Rotersand, Flesh Field, Fractured, Auto Aggression, Girls Under Glass, and Iris.

== History ==
Dependent announced at the start of 2007 that the label would close its doors to new artists and shut down once contractual obligations had been fulfilled, citing ongoing concerns with piracy. This announcement took the form of an essay in both German and English in the booklet to Dependence: Next Level Electronics Volume 2, a compilation featuring work by fourteen artists signed to the label, in which Stefan Herwig stated, "...we estimate that illegal downloads of Dependent albums outnumber legal purchases by a factor of three or even five to one".

After the label closed down, a person claiming to be Stefan Herwig uploaded the whole back catalogue to The Pirate Bay, one of the major BitTorrent trackers. Herwig denied being responsible for this which makes it all seem to be a hoax spread by Torrentfreak.

On May 15, 2009, Herwig announced that Dependent Records would reopen in the summer or fall of that year, partnering with the US-based Metropolis Records, citing fan support and the role of labels as "quality filters" for the vast number of new bands.

== See also ==
- List of record labels
