= Ronan Harris =

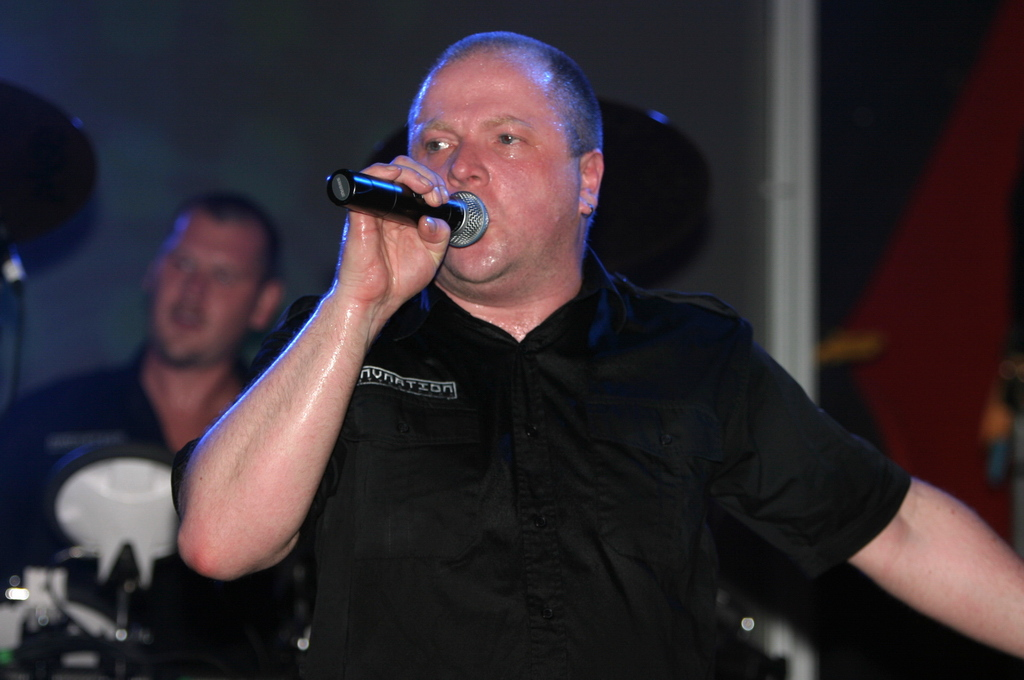
- Ronan Harris at a VNV Nation concert, 2006

Background information
- Born: 14 June 1967 (age 57)
- Genres: Futurepop; trance; synth-pop; EBM
- Occupation: Record producer
- Instrument: Vocals
- Years active: 1990–present
- Labels: Anachron Sounds

Ronan Harris (born 14 June 1967) is the founding member of the electronic music project VNV Nation. He is credited with the songwriting, production, lyrical and vocal aspects of the band's music. In the years preceding VNV Nation's debut album, he worked for Q8 Petroleum in central London as an IT manager and was a journalist and webmaster for dark electro magazine Side-Line.

== VNV Nation ==
In 1988, Harris moved from Dublin, Ireland to London, England. He began recording music as VNV Nation in 1990 and moved to Toronto, Canada later that year. In 1994, Harris moved back to Europe where he met up with Mark Jackson, who joined VNV Nation as the drummer for live shows. Since 1995, Harris has released numerous studio albums as VNV Nation.

Harris was a co-founder of Dependent Records, but left the label after VNV Nation's Futureperfect album was released in 2002. Harris now releases VNV Nation's records independently on his Anachron Sounds imprint.

In 2001, Harris produced the Angels and Agony album Eternity. He performed vocals for the futurepop supergroup Bruderschaft on their Forever EP in 2003 and appeared on AFI's 2006 Decemberunderground album, providing electronic sequences and effects for some of the songs.

In 2006, Harris founded his new project Modcom, producing instrumental electronic music based entirely on the usage of analog sequencers and synthesizers.

Harris also performs live DJ sets.

== See also ==
- Apoptygma Berzerk
- Bruderschaft
- Mark Jackson
- VNV Nation
