= VNV Nation =

British-Irish electronic music group

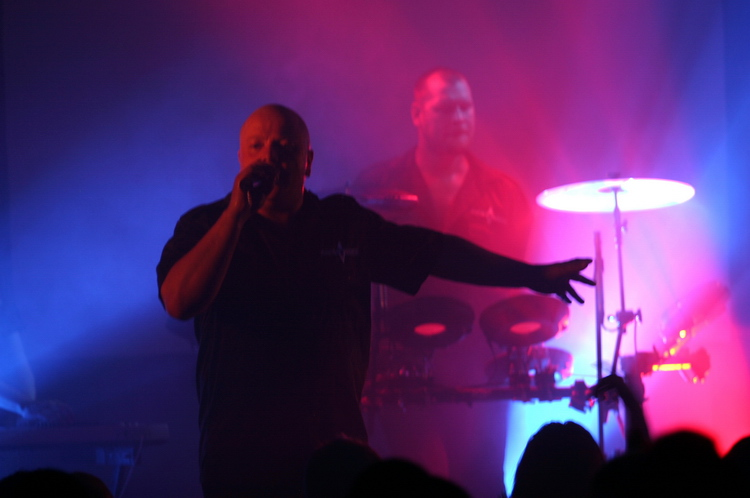
- VNV Nation Live at New City, Edmonton, September 2007

Background information
- Origin: London, England
- Genres: Synth-pop; futurepop; EBM; industrial dance; progressive trance
- Years active: 1990–present
- Labels: Anachron; Dependent; Discordia; Energy; Metropolis; Off-Beat; SubSpace; Wax Trax!; TVT
- Spinoffs: Modcom; Bruderschaft
- Members: Ronan Harris; David Gerlach; Chris Roberts; Gabriel Shaw
- Past members: Mark Jackson; Mike Wimer; Chris Norris
- Website: www.vnvnation.com

VNV Nation, also known as Victory Not Vengeance, are an Irish-German electronic music group formed in London, based out of Hamburg, and led by Ronan Harris in the roles of singer, songwriter and producer, with live members being keyboardists David Gerlach and Gabriel Shaw, and percussionist Chris Roberts.

== History ==
=== Prelude and formation ===
Ronan Harris was born and raised in Dublin, Ireland, where he was exposed to electronic music via radio, from which he developed an interest in bands such as Kraftwerk, D.A.F. and the Human League. He has also noted the influence of records by Orchestral Manoeuvres in the Dark and Yazoo. In 1983, Harris joined a band named Die Fabrik, whose punk-inspired noise and synth style was not well received in Dublin. By 1989, he had moved to London and began composing music under the name Nation, a 1984-inspired, electronic orchestral music project. Harris relocated to Toronto, Canada, in 1990, but his music output stagnated until 1994 when he revived Nation, modified by his newfound motto "Victory Not Vengeance" to become VNV Nation.

=== Early years: Advance and Follow and Praise the Fallen (1995–1998) ===
The group's first release, Advance and Follow, came out in 1995. Advance and Follow featured industrial electronic beats heavily influenced by middle-era EBM acts such as Nitzer Ebb and Front 242, along a mixture of danceable synthesizer melodies, and elements of orchestral music. Although it was the band's first full-length release, Harris regards Advance and Follow more as a set of demos than a proper album. In 2001, it was re-released as Advance and Follow 2.0, with updated production, re-recorded vocals, and five bonus tracks, which include two Front 242 covers.

Their next release, Praise the Fallen in 1998, continued largely in this vein, and they began to enjoy a larger degree of commercial success.

During that time, Harris also wrote for the online magazine Side-Line, of which he was the webmaster until 1999.

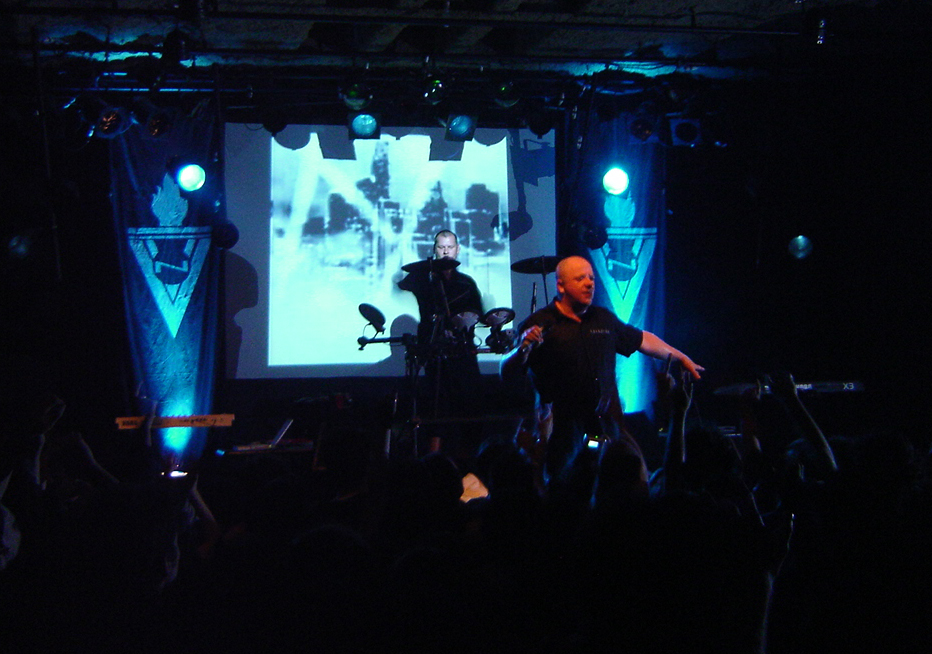
VNV Nation live in Buenos Aires, Argentina

=== Empires (1999–2001) ===
Empires, released in 1999, was their breakthrough album, gaining them widespread commercial success and topping the German DAC charts for seven weeks. Empires expanded on the band's melodic synthesizer lines and incorporated tighter song structures. Furthermore, the harsher 'sheet metal instrumentals' of Praise the Fallen were largely gone, and the music as a whole was more complex with multiple-layered arpeggios and pads. The album was composed using a mix of analog and digital synthesizers, and an Ensoniq ASR-10 sampler. Notable analog synthesizers used on the album included the ARP 2600, which was used for most of the sounds on the tracks "Firstlight," "Arclight," and "Standing," the SCI Pro One, and an Oberheim OB-1. Digital synthesizers used were the Roland JP-8000, Access Virus (used almost exclusively on the track "Darkangel"), Korg Trinity, the EMU Proteus 2000 and the Roland JV-1080.

=== Futureperfect (2001–2004) ===
Their 2002 album, Futureperfect, while retaining many industrial elements, represented a departure in many ways, largely away from EBM and towards trance and synthpop. Some neoclassical instrumental pieces were included in the album. Around this time Ronan Harris and Apoptygma Berzerk's Stefan Groth were credited with coining the term "futurepop" to describe their sound. This shift caused their mainstream popularity to increase still further, but alienated some of their fans who preferred their earlier harsher and darker sound. Notably, the album was produced using only software synthesizers instead of hardware synthesizers. It was the first VNV Nation album made entirely with software synthesizers.

The band embarked on a world tour in support of Futureperfect from 2001 to 2003. Their concerts in Berlin, Washington, D.C., and the M'era Luna Festival were recorded and edited together for release as the Pastperfect DVD. At this time VNV Nation consisted of Ronan Harris and drummer Mark Jackson.

=== Matter + Form (2005–2007) ===
Their 2005 album, Matter + Form, expanded on the soundscape established with Futureperfect. Notable for this harder-edged sound was the first single "Chrome". Also of note is the lack of effects applied to the vocals, a departure from previous albums, which allows Harris' voice more space in the mix. There were also several songs with a softer and more pensive theme. Some songs even had a slight "rock" feeling to them, mostly from how drum sequences and bass lines were arranged, the most obvious example being the final song, "Perpetual". The assortment of instruments used in the production was much larger than on previous albums. While mostly composed using software synthesizers, several different analogue modular synthesizers were used, along with an array of vintage effects. This album was also the first time the band used an outside producer. Both Matter + Form and "Chrome" peaked at #1 on the DAC Albums and Singles charts, respectively.

=== Judgement (2007–2009) ===
VNV Nation's next studio album was Judgement, released on 4 April 2007. While written and recorded in VNV Nation's own studio, located in the now defunct Soundfactory Studios in Hamburg, the album production took advantage of the main studio's facilities through the use of its collection of vintage microphones and effects, and mixing the album on the studio's ADT console.

On 25 April 2007, at the sold-out show at The Metro in Chicago, Harris stated that the rumours about Judgement being the last album were false and that more was to come and that Judgement was just the beginning.

At the alternative electronic music festival Infest in Bradford on 26 August 2007, just after the murder of Sophie Lancaster, Harris dedicated the song "Illusion" to her and contacted the family soon afterwards to offer his condolences.

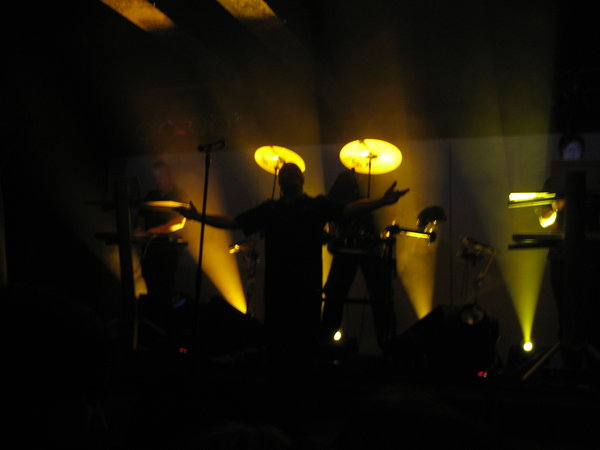
VNV Nation performing "Legion" at The Masquerade in Atlanta, Georgia, US

=== Reformation 1 and Of Faith, Power and Glory (2009) ===
Two years after Judgement, the box set Reformation 1 was released in Europe on 24 April 2009. Its US release was on 12 May.

The next album, Of Faith, Power and Glory was mentioned on the band's MySpace blog. Harris confirmed to Side-Line that they were aiming for late April to release the album, which would be titled Of Faith, Power and Glory, or as Harris described it: "The 3 things that people desire and which can make you or destroy you!"

Due to the release of "Reformation 1" in mid-April, the release of the album was postponed; it appeared in the US on CD and in the iTunes Store on 23 June 2009, and in Europe on 19 June 2009.

=== Crossing the Divide and Automatic (2010–2011) ===
A remix collection called Crossing The Divide was planned for release on 8 June 2010, but was delayed until May 2012. The update on the official website cited unforeseen circumstances and personal matters for the delay. On 14 May 2012, the EP was announced on the band's Facebook page and made available for free via SoundCloud. There were also plans for a number of extended and enhanced re-releases of previous albums in 2010; however these plans did not materialize.

On 16 September 2011, VNV Nation's eighth studio album Automatic, was released for most of Europe, with the physical CD released on 25 October 2011 in the United States.

=== Gothic meets Klassik, Transnational, Resonance: Music For Orchestra Vol. 1 and Compendium 1995-2015 - 20 Years Of Work (2012–2016) ===
In November 2012, VNV Nation, Blutengel and Staubkind performed at the Gothic meets Klassik festival in Leipzig. On the 10th, they played a standard electronic set, and on the 11th, they performed with Ronan Harris on vocals accompanied by a full symphony orchestra for the first time. The show was recorded for release, but a problem with the recording equipment rendered the audio unusable. As a result, Ronan began to work with the arranger on an album of VNV Nation songs scored for orchestra, which would include the tracks performed at Gothic Meets Klassik as well as additional songs. Ronan also performed a selection of VNV Nation songs with a classical pianist on the 2013 Gothic Cruise.

The album Transnational was released on 11 October in Europe, 15 October in North America, and elsewhere on 19 November, preceded by a promotional tour beginning on 2 October 2013.

The orchestral album Resonance: Music For Orchestra Vol. 1 was released on 15 May 2015. It consists of tracks selected from their back catalogue reimagined for orchestra. It was recorded in the Babelsberg Studios outside Berlin at the end of February 2015, the same studios where scores for films such as The Hunger Games: Mockingjay – Part 1 and Part 2 were recorded. Resonance reached #7 on the official German Album Charts the week of 22 May 2015 and respectively #3 on the US Billboard Classical Crossover Album Charts and #4 on the US Billboard Classical Music Charts for 30 May 2015. A tour for Resonance also took place, featuring the Deutsches Flimorchester Babelsberg.

A twenty-year anniversary tour called "Compendium 1995-2015 - 20 Years Of Work" was announced in 2015, with the European leg starting in Germany on 4 December 2015 and ending in Czechia on 20 April 2016. A North American leg was also announced, starting in Seattle on 7 October 2016 and ending in New York on 29 October 2016.

=== Automatic Empire, Resonance Extended and Noire (2016–2021) ===
During December 2016 and during late 2017, VNV Nation performed the Automatic Empire tour which consisted of the albums Automatic and Empire played almost in full, with the exceptions being the songs "Photon" from Automatic and "Firstlight" from Empires.

On 16 November 2017, it was announced that Mark Jackson, who had participated as live drummer at concerts since the mid-1990s, had left VNV Nation to "pursue other paths in life", according to the statement made by the band. Their work on the next album was also teased during this announcement.

The Resonance tour, retitled Resonance Extended, was continued for a few shows in December 2017, also with the Deutsches Flimorchester Babelsberg.

In June 2018, their tenth studio album, Noire, was announced along with the European leg of the Noire tour. Noire released as a digital album in all markets and as a physical CD in non-American markets via Anachron Records. In the American market, the physical CD was distributed by Metropolis Records, with a release date of 7 December 2018.

The song "When Is the Future?" was supported by the release of a music video, which released on 8 October 2018, which was the first official VNV Nation music video.

The album received mostly positive reviews, with critics commending its emotional depth and sonic complexity and heavily criticizing the three instrumental tracks on the album.

Noire was followed by the Noire tour, with the first legs of the tour taking place during late 2018 in Europe and North America. The third and final leg of the tour, which also took place in Europe, started and ended in early 2019.

=== Electric Sun and VNV Nation and the Philharmonie Leipzig (2022–2024) ===
In April 2022, VNV Nation announced that its eleventh studio album, Electric Sun, would arrive in April 2023 to coincide with the Electric Sun tour, which started in Denmark on 23 February 2023 and ended in Glasgow on 28 May 2023.

On 28 April 2023, VNV Nation released its eleventh studio album, Electric Sun, on LP, CD, and digitally. It was preceded by the singles "Before the Rain" and "Wait," which was accompanied by VNV Nation's second music video. "Wait" spent several weeks at the top of the German Alternative Charts (DAC) in the Summer of 2023 while "Before the Rain" peaked at #2.

Electric Sun received positive reviews, with critics praised the album's rich soundscapes and innovative use of both vintage and modern analog synthesizers.

In June 2023, a North American leg of the Electric Sun tour was officially announced to take place during late 2023, with a 2024 leg announced later on after several shows were postponed, making up the final dates of the Electric Sun tour.

A limited time special gold vinyl edition of "Resonance: Music for Orchestra Vol. 1" was announced on 12 June 2023, with a release date of 29 July 2023, with another orchestral tour, this time featuring the Philharmonie Leipzig and Diary of Dreams, being announced shortly after in September 2023. The tour took place during May 2024, only a few days after the end of the Electric Sun tour.

=== Construct and Destruct (2024–2025) ===
On 9 June 2024, VNV Nation announced that its twelfth studio album and first double album, Construct // Destruct, would arrive in 2025 to coincide with a February 2025 European Tour, which starts in Germany on 5 February 2025 and ends in Sweden on 6 April 2025.

In late 2024, VNV Nation was added to the Festival Mediaval, the Amphi Festival, and the Der Schwarze Ball 2025 lineups as headliners, with all shows a part of the Construct // Destruct tour.

During an interview in December of 2024, it was revealed that the double album, originally called Construct // Destruct, had been split into Construct and Destruct, with Ronan saying, "Construct became bigger, and Destruct became something completely different than was ever imagined". It was later revealed Construct would be released in late March and Destruct would be released a few weeks later.

The album, which was supposed to arrive on 28 March 2025, was delayed to 9 May 2025, with a surprise single "Silence Speaks" being released a few days after the delay announcement.

== Discography ==
- Advance and Follow (1995)
- Praise the Fallen (1998)
- Empires (1999)
- Futureperfect (2002)
- Matter + Form (2005)
- Judgement (2007)
- Of Faith, Power and Glory (2009)
- Automatic (2011)
- Transnational (2013)
- Noire (2018)
- Electric Sun (2023)
- Construct (2025)
- Destruct (2025)
