= Futurepop =

Electronic music genre

- Stylistic origins: Electropop; trance; EBM; techno
- Cultural origins: Late 1990s and 2000s, Western Europe
- Typical instruments: Synthesizer, music software

Futurepop is an electronic music genre that has been characterized as a blend of synth-pop, EBM and dance beats, based on trance and techno.

It developed in Western Europe as an outgrowth of both the EBM and electro-industrial music cultures and it began to emerge in the late 1990s with artists such as VNV Nation, Covenant, and Apoptygma Berzerk. Other leading genre artists were Assemblage 23, Icon of Coil, Neuroticfish, and Rotersand.

Futurepop is associated with the cybergoth subculture. It has become popular in alternative dance clubs, particularly in Germany. Music festivals that feature futurepop bands include Infest, Amphi festival, Wave Gotik Treffen and M'era Luna.

== Characteristics ==
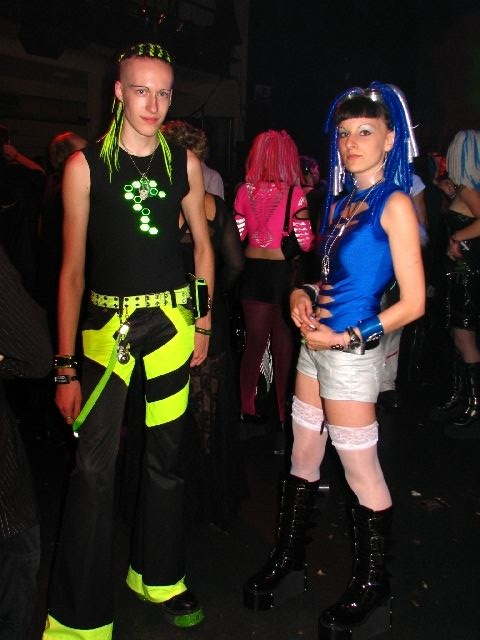
Futurepop is heavily associated with the cybergoth subculture

Futurepop is mainly characterized by its "technoid" and "dance-oriented" pop music structures, catchy melodies, the "pervasive use of trance beats", and an absence of vocal modification. The genre is distinguished from regular trance music by "retaining the lyrical and vocal structure of synthpop". Its "transparent sounds" and "smooth production" style have been considered as being "chart-compatible" and "designed for music clubs".

Tom Shear of Assemblage 23 described the style ironically as "mostly people who can't sing over '90s era trance patches".

== Etymology ==
Ronan Harris of VNV Nation credited himself with the term "futurepop" during a discussion with Apoptygma Berzerk vocalist Stephan Groth to describe the sounds of their music and similar groups at the time. According to Sorted Magazine writer "Girl the Bourgeois Individualist":

He says he came up with it during a conversation with Apop's Stefan Groth when they were discussing the arrogant attitude the press had towards the scene, dismissing it as simply an '80s revival. There was also the problem with the terms that were around, they regarded electro as encompassing too many things, while EBM is not what it used to be and the idea of the whole dark scene gives the impression that everyone is hanging out in crypts and listening to Sopor Aeternus.

== See also ==
- Post-industrial music
