= 21st Circuitry Shox 2 =

Compilation album by Various artists
- Released: September 29, 1998
- Genre: EBM
- Length: 70:04
- Label: 21st Circuitry

21st Circuitry V/A chronology
Newer Wave 2.0 (1998)	21st Circuitry Shox 2 (1998)

21st Circuitry Shox 2 is a various artists compilation album released on September 29, 1998 by 21st Circuitry.

== Reception ==
Professional ratings
Review scores
Source	Rating
Allmusic	1.5/5 stars

21st Circuitry Shox 2 received criticism from Aiding & Abetting for providing an insufficient introduction to the bands that make up the album. Keith Farley of AllMusic said the compilation "includes tracks from Unit 187, Hate Dept., Ga-T, Xorcist and others."

== Track listing ==
No.	Title	Artist	Length
1.	"Energy"	Wod	6:57
2.	"White Skin" (Distorted Acid Mix)	Shunt	4:46
3.	"Superdrama" (Tears of Joy Mix)	Hate Dept.	4:21
4.	"Pain" (Internal Abrasion Mix)	LUXT	3:53
5.	"Alias"	Scar Tissue	3:52
6.	"Bomblast"	Xorcist	4:59
7.	"Luminal" (Test Version)	Covenant	4:44
8.	"Les Amants" (Mainlining Mix)	Hyperdex-1-Sect	5:01
9.	"Early Retirement" (Demo Mix)	Unit:187	4:03
10.	"Xenomorph" (Forma Tadre Mix)	New Mind	5:35
11.	"Prozak Check"	Genital A-Tech	5:04
12.	"Words in Motion" (Tribal Mix)	Templebeat	5:04
13.	"Things"	Gracious Shades	2:32
14.	"Untitled"	Potty Mouth Sissys	10:30

== Personnel ==
Adapted from the 21st Circuitry Shox 2 liner notes.

== Release history ==
Region	Date	Label	Format	Catalog
United States	1997	21st Circuitry	CD	21C.CD38
