= Coldwave Breaks II =

Compilation album by Various artists
- Released: October 28, 1997
- Genres: Industrial, EBM
- Length: 73:41
- Label: 21st Circuitry

21st Circuitry V/A chronology
Newer Wave (1997)	Coldwave Breaks II (1997)	Newer Wave 2.0 (1998)

Coldwave Breaks II is a various artists compilation album released on October 28, 1997 by 21st Circuitry.

== Reception ==
Professional ratings
Review scores
Source	Rating
Allmusic	3/5 stars

Aiding & Abetting compared Coldwave Breaks II favorably to the first compilation, saying "this one carries forth the same attitude from the first, and works to find new and innovative electronic-oriented bands." Steve Huey of allmusic awarded the compilation three out of five possible stars. Critic Richard T. Thurston of Ink 19 warmly reviewed the album and described it as "venture into the dark side of industrial techhouse." Sonic Boom called the album one of the "more concise Sythcore collections of the year" and credited Acumen, Beauty, LUXT and Rammstein as being standouts.

== Track listing ==
No.	Title	Artist	Length
1.	"Nobody" (Wormstomping Mix)	Wormwood Project	4:48
2.	"Therapy"	MPI	5:24
3.	"Fuckyerbrainsout"	Acumen	4:58
4.	"Incessant"	Discipline of Anarchy	4:22
5.	"Du riechst so gut"	Rammstein	4:49
6.	"Flame On"	Chainsaws.and.Children	6:08
7.	"Anger Impulse"	Hate Dept.	3:53
8.	"Trust in Me" (Remix)	Waiting for God	5:02
9.	"Burn"	LUXT	7:18
10.	"Dead Seasons"	Purge	5:01
11.	"Ants, Sheep, Drunks, + Whores"	Alien Faktor	4:13
12.	"2 Wires"	16volt	4:46
13.	"Stuck" (Battery Remix)	Slave Unit	5:12
14.	"Rewind"	Beauty	4:22
23.	"Untitled"	Potty Mouth Sissys	2:53

Notes

- Tracks 15–22 consist of four seconds of silence each

== Accolades ==
Year	Publication	Country	Accolade	Rank
1995	CMJ New Music Monthly	United States	"Dance Top 25"	7
"*" denotes an unordered list.

== Personnel ==
Adapted from the Coldwave Breaks II liner notes.

- Josh Finney – cover art, design
- Guy Slater – mastering

== Release history ==
Region	Date	Label	Format	Catalog
United States	1997	21st Circuitry	CD	21C.CD30
