= 21st Circuitry Shox =

Compilation album by Various artists
- Released: July 16, 1996
- Genres: Industrial, EBM
- Length: 69:27
- Label: 21st Circuitry

21st Circuitry V/A chronology
Coldwave Breaks (1995)	21st Circuitry Shox (1996)	Newer Wave (1997)

21st Circuitry Shox is a various artists compilation album released on July 16, 1996, by 21st Circuitry.

== Reception ==
Aiding & Abetting was enthusiastic towards 21st Circuitry Shox and said "if you haven't gotten acquainted with 21st Circuitry and want to delve into the more conceptual realm of industrial dance music, then by all means apply here." Tom Schulte of allmusic awarded the compilation three out of five stars and described it as "fun and a real history lesson to listen to." Sonic Boom also gave the album a positive review, saying "the entire compilation is an exceedingly strong collection of tracks well worth the price of admission."

== Track listing ==
No.	Title	Artist	Length
1.	"Stance"	Scar Tissue	6:15
2.	"Bad Mojo" (Sacrosanct Mix)	Xorcist	6:20
3.	"Egoist" (On the Cross Mix)	Steril	4:44
4.	"Lardass"	Unit:187	4:49
5.	"No Remission"	Steril	5:01
6.	"New Power"	Hate Dept.	3:35
7.	"Amie"	Gracious Shades	3:56
8.	"Beat Me Up"	Hate Dept.	3:06
9.	"Iron Helix"	Xorcist	5:56
10.	"Melting"	Nerve Filter	4:32
11.	"Bitches"	Xorcist	6:38
12.	"Metamorphose"	Gracious Shades	4:12
13.	"Razor"	Non-Aggression Pact	4:36
14.	"UNGDSOB"	Xorcist	5:47

== Personnel ==
Adapted from the 21st Circuitry Shox liner notes.

- tara ntula – cover art, design

== Release history ==
Region	Date	Label	Format	Catalog
United States	1996	21st Circuitry	CD	21C.CD13
