= The House That Hate Built =

Compilation album by Hate Dept.
- Released: August 7, 2001
- Recorded: 1990 – 2000
- Genre: Industrial rock
- Length: 87:28
- Label: Mars Colony Music
- Producer: Steven Seibold

Hate Dept. chronology
Technical Difficulties (1999)	The House That Hate Built (2001)	DITCH (2003)

The House That Hate Built is a compilation album by Hate Dept., released on August 7, 2001 by Mars Colony Music. The first disc contains demos and live tracks.

== Reception ==
DJ Arcanus of Lollipop Magazine gave The House That Hate Built a mixed review, saying "show[s] the band dabbling across many genres and never achieving more than mediocrity."

== Track listing ==
All tracks are written by Steven Seibold.

Disc one
No.	Title	From artist (date)	Length
1.	"More Like Me"	meat.your.maker (1994)	3:35
2.	"Beat Me Up"	meat.your.maker (1994)	3:23
3.	"Dead Peddler" (Live)		3:52
4.	"Anger Impulse"	Technical Difficulties (1999)	3:58
5.	"Drew"	meat.your.maker (1994)	3:36
6.	"Won't Stay Lit"	Omnipresent (1996)	3:39
7.	"I Am Truth" (Live)	meat.your.maker (1994)	3:27
8.	"Bitch"	Omnipresent (1996)	3:28
9.	"New Power"	Omnipresent (1996)	3:37
10.	"Start Digging"	meat.your.maker (1994)	3:58
11.	"Release It" (Live)		4:56

Disc two
No.	Title	From artist (date)	Length
1.	"California"	DITCH (2003)	4:33
2.	"Countergrowth"	New Power (1996)	5:28
3.	"Hit Back"	Technical Difficulties (1999)	4:25
4.	"Tough Guy"		3:35
5.	"Cowgirl"	Mainline E.P. (1995)	3:41
6.	"You're the Only One"		3:05
7.	"Technical Difficulties"	Technical Difficulties (1999)	3:35
8.	"New Power" (Uberzone Remix)	New Power (1996)	6:58
9.	"Fiend"	Technical Difficulties (1999)	3:41
10.	"Gone"	Technical Difficulties (1999)	3:52
11.	"Babyfat"		3:13

== Personnel ==
Adapted from the liner notes of The House That Hate Built.

- The Gerrixx – cover art, photography
- Dustin Moore – photography
- Steven Seibold – production

== Release history ==
Region	Date	Label	Format	Catalog
United States	2001	Mars Colony Music	CD	20107-2
