= Newer Wave =

Compilation album by Various artists
- Released: February 28, 1997
- Genre: Industrial, EBM
- Length: 69:36
- Label: 21st Circuitry

21st Circuitry V/A chronology
21st Circuitry Shox (1996)	Newer Wave (1997)	Coldwave Breaks II (1997)

Newer Wave is a various artists compilation album released on February 28, 1997 by 21st Circuitry.

== Reception ==
Professional ratings
Review scores
Source	Rating
AllMusic	3/5 stars

Aiding & Abetting gave Newer Wave a mixed review, calling the material "a bit silly" but "a good idea, and the bands here try real hard to create new versions of well-worn tunes." Tom Schulte of AllMusic described the compilation as "fun and a real history lesson to listen to." Sonic Boom said "regardless of whether you thought the eighties was a collection of music filled with unimaginative drivel or was the groundwork of the modern electronic dance scene you'll get a kick out of this compilation" and "definitely of those compilations bound to give you fits of nostalgia for years to come."

== Track listing ==
No.	Title	Writer(s)	Artist	Length
1.	"Turning Japanese" (The Vapors cover)	David Fenton	16volt	4:46
2.	"I Ran" (A Flock of Seagulls cover)	Frank Maudsley, Paul Reynolds, Mike Score, Ali Score	Assemblage 23	3:54
3.	"Red Skies" (Dead or Alive cover)	Charlie Barrett, Cy Curnin, Rupert Greenall, Jamie West-Oram, Adam Woods	Beauty	4:20
4.	"Cars" (Gary Numan cover)	Gary Numan	LUXT	4:33
5.	"Candy-O" (The Cars cover)	Ric Ocasek	Out Out	2:35
6.	"Never Say Never" (Romeo Void cover)	Benjamin Bossi, Larry Carter, Debora Iyall, Peter Woods, Frank Zincavage	Kevorkian Death Cycle	5:29
7.	"The Chauffeur" (Duran Duran cover)	James Bates, Simon Le Bon, John Taylor, Roger Taylor, Andy Taylor	Battery	4:39
8.	"Destination Unknown" (Missing Persons cover)	Dale Bozzio, Terry Bozzio, Warren Cuccurullo	Scar Tissue	4:59
9.	"Master and Servant" (Depeche Mode cover)	Martin Gore	Hate Dept.	5:14
10.	"I Want Candy" (The Strangeloves cover)	Bert Berns, Bob Feldman, Jerry Goldstein, Richard Gottehrer	Black Metal Box	5:43
11.	"You Spin Me Round" (Dead or Alive cover)	Pete Burns, Steve Coy, Wayne Hussey, Tim Lever, Mike Percy	Templebeat	3:42
12.	"Whip It" (Devo cover)	Gerald Casale, Mark Mothersbaugh	Collide	3:31
13.	"Relax" (Frankie Goes to Hollywood cover)	Peter Gill, Holly Johnson, Brian Nash, Mark O'Toole	Unit:187	6:09
14.	"Sex Dwarf" (Soft Cell cover)	Marc Almond, David Ball	Sabotage Q.C.Q.C.?	4:26
15.	"Whisper to a Scream" (The Icicle Works cover)	Ian McNabb	Acumen	5:37

== Personnel ==
Adapted from the Newer Wave liner notes.

- Case – featuring (1)
- Matt – cover art, design

== Release history ==
Region	Date	Label	Format	Catalog
United States	1997	21st Circuitry	CD	21C.CD21
