= Coldwave Breaks =

Compilation album by Various artists
- Released: October 17, 1995
- Genre: Industrial
- Length: 61:48
- Label: 21st Circuitry

21st Circuitry V/A chronology
Death Rave 2010 (1994)	Coldwave Breaks (1995)	21st Circuitry Shox (1996)

Coldwave Breaks is a various artists compilation album released on October 17, 1995 by 21st Circuitry.

== Reception ==
Aiding & Abetting gave Coldwave Breaks a positive review and called it "a collection of club-ready stuff that has enough guitars and general noise to satisfy the staunchest loud music aficionado." Tom Schulte of allmusic awarded the compilation three out of five stars and described it as "fun and a real history lesson to listen to."

== Track listing ==
No.	Title	Artist	Length
1.	"21st Century" (Rough Sex Demo)	Chemlab	5:06
2.	"Pathetic Conviction"	Naked Lunch	4:44
3.	"This Blackness"	Gracious Shades	3:33
4.	"Tension Upon Tension" (Hate Dept. Mix)	BOL	3:32
5.	"Rage"	Schnitt Acht	5:02
6.	"Cringe"	Pain Station	5:54
7.	"Stronghold"	Pinchpoint	4:39
8.	"Goin' Off"	Piece Machine	3:53
9.	"Free My Soul"	Kaos Kontrol	4:12
10.	"Der Tod Ist Mein Meister Aus Deutschland"	Some More Crime	4:08
11.	"Skin" (Mix of Hate)	16volt	4:07
12.	"New Power"	Hate Dept.	3:35
13.	"E&E"	Out Out	4:24
14.	"Overgod"	Steril	4:59

== Personnel ==
Adapted from the Coldwave Breaks liner notes.

- Don Blanchard – cover art
- Nathan Moody – cover art, illustrations
- Guy Slater – mastering

== Release history ==
Region	Date	Label	Format	Catalog
United States	1995	21st Circuitry	CD	21C.CD10
