= Rebuild (Scar Tissue album) =

Rebuld

Remix album by Scar Tissue
- Released: May 19, 1998
- Genre: Electro-industrial
- Length: 72:39
- Label: 21st Circuitry
- Producer: Steve Watkins

Scar Tissue chronology
TMOTD (1997)	Rebuld (1998)	Form/Alkaline (2008)

Rebuild is a remix album by Scar Tissue, released on May 19, 1998 by 21st Circuitry. It contains four new compositions as well as remixes and live versions of tracks from Separator and TMOTD. The picture on the album's front was designed by musician and sound engineer Nathan Moody, who illustrated covers for the band's previous 21st Circuitry releases.

== Reception ==
Aiding & Abetting commended the music of Rebuld for possessing "a haunting quality, something that is aided by the spectacular use of silence." Sonic Boom praised Scar Tissue for their "talent for grinding percussion and dark electronics" and said of Rebuld that "there is not a bad track on this release" and "if there is a way to reinterpret music that isn't covered by this collection, I certainly don't know what it is." A critic at Last Sigh Magazine called the album "a varied look into their music" and further appreciated the inclusion of remixes and live tracks.

== Track listing ==
All tracks are written by Scar Tissue, except "Identified by Dental Records" by Nial McGaughey and Phil Petrocelli.

No.	Title	Remixer(s)	Length
1.	"Double Blind" (Subjective Mix)	Scar Tissue	5:59
2.	"Subterrain" (Cleener Version)	Daniel Myer	6:53
3.	"Remembrane" (Nerve Filter Mix)	Nerve Filter	6:20
4.	"Cascade" (Cevin Key Mix)	cEvin Key	4:49
5.	"Soiled" (Necromix)	Necrofix	5:23
6.	"Subterranean Screens" (Railgun Mix)	Railgun	4:26
7.	"Not Your Own" (Tensor Terminated Mix)	Tensor	5:09
8.	"Scsix" (New Mind Mix)	New Mind	4:55
9.	"Intro" (Live at The Fenix in Seattle)		0:55
10.	"Choking on Fate" (Live)		3:42
11.	"Afekt"		2:39
12.	"Mammoth"		3:40
13.	"Lattice"		6:19
14.	"Concealed Toy"		3:53
15.	"Crashtime" (SMP Remix)	SMP	3:46
16.	"Identified by Dental Records (Perception Mix)" (3D House of Beef cover)	Scar Tissue	3:51

== Personnel ==
Adapted from the Rebuld liner notes.

Scar Tissue

- Masayuki Ishikawa (as Tao) – turntables
- Philip Caldwell – programming, guitar, percussion
- Steve Watkins – programming, percussion, production

Additional musicians

- Jason Bazinet – vocals (15)
- Jonathan Sharp – sampler (14)

Production and design

- Nathan Moody – cover art, design

== Release history ==
Region	Date	Label	Format	Catalog
United States	1998	21st Circuitry	CD	21C.35
