= Europa (Covenant album) =

Studio album by Covenant
- Released: May 26, 1998
- Genre: Electronic; synth-pop
- Length: 46:59
- Label: 21st Circuitry

Covenant chronology
| Sequencer (1996) | Europa (1998) | United States of Mind (2000) |

Singles from Europa
- 1. "Final Man" Released: Feb 1998; 2. "Euro EP" Released: Oct 1998

Professional ratings
Review scores
| Source | Rating |
|---|---|
| Allmusic | 4/5 stars |

Europa is Covenant's third album. It was released on May 26, 1998, by 21st Circuitry. Tracks such as "Leviathan" and "Go Film" remain popular favourites and are played often by the band. Both were recorded live on 2007's In Transit live album. "Go Film" was also released on the Euro EP along with "Tension". The album peaked at No. 101 on the CMJ Radio Top 200 while reaching No. 3 on the CMJ RPM chart.

== Track listing ==
| No. | Title | Length |
|---|---|---|
| 1. | "Tension" | 4:50 |
| 2. | "Leviathan" | 5:19 |
| 3. | "2D" | 4:42 |
| 4. | "Wind of the North" | 4:33 |
| 5. | "Riot" | 4:37 |
| 6. | "I Am" | 5:30 |
| 7. | "Final Man" (Version) | 4:52 |
| 8. | "Go Film" | 5:04 |
| 9. | "Wall of Sound" | 7:32 |
