= Modern Ruin =

Modern Ruin may refer to:

- Modern ruins, a neologism referring to ruins of architecture constructed in the recent past
- Modern Ruin (Covenant album), a 2011 album
- Modern Ruin (Frank Carter & the Rattlesnakes album), a 2017 album
