= In Transit (Covenant album) =

Live album by Covenant
- Released: October 23, 2007
- Genre: Electronic
- Length: 104:00
- Label: Metropolis Records
- Producer: Jacob Hellner

Covenant chronology
Skyshaper	In Transit	Modern Ruin

In Transit is Covenant's second live album, released fall 2007. "Available as a CD and DVD, the releases showcase Covenant’s ability to defy all genre labels by their memorable stage show and outstanding compositions."

== Track listing ==
No.	Title	Length
1.	"Intro"	1:58
2.	"20Hz"	5:05
3.	"Bullet"	5:00
4.	"Leviathan"	5:47
5.	"Go Film"	5:03
6.	"The Men"	6:09
7.	"We Stand Alone"	5:35
8.	"Ritual Noise"	7:34
9.	"Happy Man"	2:45
10.	"Call the Ships to Port"	8:28
11.	"Dead Stars"	7:05
12.	"Pulse"	5:44
13.	"Babel"	6:48
