= TMOTD =

Studio album by Scar Tissue
- Released: April 15, 1997
- Genre: Electro-industrial
- Length: 66:06
- Label: 21st Circuitry
- Producer: Steve Watkins

Scar Tissue chronology
Separator (1996)	TMOTD (1997)	Rebuild (1998)

TMOTD is the second studio album by Scar Tissue, released on April 15, 1997 by 21st Circuitry.

== Music ==
TMOTD contained further tracks recorded during the sessions that produced the Scar Tissue's debut. The music displayed the band consciously shifted away from percussive oriented pieces towards electronic compositions with increased use of vocal samples and keyboard rhythms. Composer Steve Watkins has called "A Million Screens" his favorite from the album.

== Artwort ==
Scar Tissue's composer Steve Watkins contacted Jhonen Vasquez, illustrator for the comic Johnny the Homicidal Maniac, to create the band's logo on TMOTD. The front illustration was created by musician and sound engineer Nathan Moody, who designed the album covers for the band's entire 21st Circuitry output.

== Reception ==
Professional ratings
Review scores
Source	Rating
AllMusic	4.5/5 stars

Aiding & Abetting praised the atmosphere and ambition of TMOTD, describing the music as "almost sound construction posing as songs." Tom Schulte of Allmusic awarded the album four out of five possible stars, calling it a masterpiece of the genre and saying "Scar Tissue takes the most chances in this category of electronica, and therefore takes listeners the furthest" and that their music "the most elaborate and schizophrenic representatives of the darkwave genre." Sonic Boom praised the band's ability to improvise and said the album "breaks new ground without sacrificing all of the lessons learned previously, thereby making it a much more cohesive effort." Last Sigh Magazine also commended the band's musical prowess and said "there are also a great deal of harmonic surges on this release which add depth and intensity to the rhythms and beats within, and great choices of vocal/film sampling."

== Track listing ==
All tracks are written by Philip Caldwell and Steve Watkins.

No.	Title	Length
1.	"Crashtime"	5:55
2.	"Cascade"	4:45
3.	"Not Your Own"	4:23
4.	"A Million Screens"	5:04
5.	"Aftermath"	3:45
6.	"Switch"	4:22
7.	"Membrane"	6:11
8.	"Gravity"	3:31
9.	"In This Place"	4:30
10.	"Subterrain"	3:23
11.	"Crying Response Machine"	2:47
12.	"Laughing Response Machine"	5:47
13.	"The Devices 1"	0:22
14.	"The Devices 2"	0:57
15.	"The Devices 3"	0:48
16.	"The Devices 4"	0:46
17.	"The Devices 5"	1:59
18.	"The Devices 6"	1:31
19.	"The Devices 7"	0:18
20.	"The Devices 8"	0:19
21.	"The Devices 9"	0:38
22.	"The Devices 10"	1:27
23.	"The Devices 11"	1:46
24.	"The Devices 12"	0:15
25.	"The Devices 13"	0:37

== Personnel ==
Adapted from the TMOTD liner notes.

Scar Tissue

- Philip Caldwell – sequencing, bass guitar, percussion
- Steve Watkins – lead vocals, sampler, sequencing, bass guitar, percussion, production, engineering

Additional performers

- Jen Slatten – violin (9)
- Seann Vowell (Dofino) – tape (12)
- Alex Yang (as Theatre of Cruelty) – tape (12)

Production and design

- Nathan Moody – cover art, design
- Jhonen Vasquez – design

== Release history ==
Region	Date	Label	Format	Catalog
United States	1997	21st Circuitry	CD	21C.26
