= Flood Magazine =

American online magazine

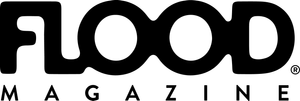
- Senior editor: Mike LeSuer
- Editorial director: Randy Bookasta
- News writer: Will Schube
- Publisher: Alan Sartirana; Randy Bookasta (co.)
- Founder: Alan Sartirana
- Based in: Los Angeles, California
- Language: English
- Website: floodmagazine.com

Flood Magazine is an American music magazine based in Los Angeles, California. Founded by Alan Sartirana, it covers music, art, and popular culture through interviews, feature stories, and reviews. Flood also organizes the annual Floodfest concert series in some US cities, and has collaborated with artists as well as cultural organizations on special projects, such as its 2020 Action Issue supporting independent music venues during the COVID-19 pandemic.

== Organization ==
Flood Magazine is published by Alan Sartirana, with Randy Bookasta serving as co-publisher and editorial director. As of 2026, Mike LeSuer is a senior editor and Will Schube is a news writer. The magazine is based in Los Angeles, California.

== History ==
Flood Magazine was established in 2014 when the magazine Filter ceased operations after 12 years, with its co-founders Alan Miller and Alan Sartirana amicably parting ways.

In 2020, during the COVID-19 pandemic, Flood Magazine published a special 160-page Action Issue, to support independent music venues affected by nationwide shutdowns; it featured three covers designed by Shepard Fairey, with proceeds from print sales and a limited-edition signed art print benefiting the National Independent Venue Association (NIVA) Emergency Relief Fund. Guest editors and contributors included David Byrne, Patti Smith, H.E.R., Cordae, Vic Mensa, Michael Stipe, the Flaming Lips, and Dinner Party, alongside features on organizations like Rock the Vote and HeadCount and interviews with artists and independent venue owners.

== Content ==
In September 2021, Flood Magazine premiered Jackson+Sellers' single "Hush" ahead of the release of their debut studio album, Breaking Point, alongside an interview where the duo discussed the origins of their collaboration, songwriting process, and shared musical influences.

Flood Magazine organizes the annual Floodfest concert series in several US cities. Floodfest Austin, its flagship event, is held during South by Southwest (SXSW) and has featured performers like Dungeon Family, Spoon, Vince Staples, White Denim, Peaches, and Run the Jewels. The magazine has also hosted Floodfest events in Chicago and Las Vegas.
