= Razing Eden =

Studio album by LUXT
- Released: March 3, 1998
- Studio: Chalkhead Digital (Yuba City, CA)
- Genre: Industrial metal
- Length: 73:53
- Label: 21st Circuitry
- Producer: Erie Loch

LUXT chronology
Disrepair (1997)	Razing Eden (1998)	Chromasex Monkeydrive (2000)

Razing Eden is the third studio album by LUXT, released on March 3, 1998 by 21st Circuitry.

== Reception ==
Professional ratings
Review scores
Source	Rating
Allmusic	4/5 stars

Allmusic awarded Razing Eden four out of five stars, calling it "a marked improvement over their first, featuring bigger, more melodic hooks and better production that hold the listener's attention more consistently through the course of the album." Aiding & Abetting praised the album for being "drenched in noise" and "power[ing] its compositions with simple but strong beat patterns and melodic ideas". Last Sigh Magazine noted an improvement over previous material by LUXT and said it was excellent to hear the band's growth as musicians. Lollipop Magazine called the album an improvement over its predecessor and said "the engineering and mixing quality is superb and as such all the electronics, guitars, and vocals all flow smoothly together." Sonic Boom commended the band's change in stylistic direction and willingness to experiment with electronics and vocal harmonies.

== Track listing ==
All lyrics are written by Erie Loch, except "Kashmir" by Robert Plant; all music is composed by Anna Christine and Erie Loch, except "Kashmir" by John Bonham, Jimmy Page and Robert Plant.

No.	Title	Length
1.	"Witchhunt"	4:14
2.	"Parasites" (N-Vitro Mix)	5:05
3.	"Spite"	3:36
4.	"Zero"	4:33
5.	"Cleanser"	3:19
6.	"Technochrist (Second Coming)"	4:21
7.	"Lies of Angels"	5:21
8.	"Kashmir" (Led Zeppelin cover)	6:47
9.	"Snowblind Entropy"	4:01
10.	"Perpetusex"	6:03
11.	"Parasites"	5:03
12.	"Cleanser" (Egamorph Mix)	5:02
13.	"Tar"	4:44
14.	"Bliss"	3:19
15.	"Witchhunt" (ANiMoo Mix)	5:28
16.	"Untitled"	2:57

== Personnel ==
Adapted from the Razing Eden liner notes.

LUXT

- Anna Christine – bass guitar, keyboards, sampler, vocals
- Erie Loch – guitar, keyboards, sampler, vocals, production

Additional performers

- Derek Geisser – remixing (15)
- Dave Hubbard – instruments
- Gregory A. Lopez – remixing (15)
- Phil Mohr – instruments, remixing (2)
- Michael Tapson – remixing (15)

== Release history ==
Region	Date	Label	Format	Catalog
United States	1998	21st Circuitry	CD	21C.33
