= Death Rave 2010 =

Compilation album by Various artists
- Released: July 1994
- Genre: Techno
- Length: 43:30
- Label: 21st Circuitry

21st Circuitry V/A chronology
Death Rave 2000 (1993)	Death Rave 2010 (1994)	Coldwave Breaks (1995)

Death Rave 2010 is a various artists compilation album released in July 1994 by 21st Circuitry.

== Track listing ==
No.	Title	Artist	Length
1.	"Melting"	Nerve Filter	4:33
2.	"Tech 153"	Nerve Filter	3:52
3.	"Konspiracy"	The Binary Corps of IX	3:54
4.	"Geigabyte"	The Binary Corps of IX	3:36
5.	"Destroy Belief"	Shiverhead	4:52
6.	"Highway to Hell"	Shiverhead	3:53
7.	"Another Hit"	Planet Anger	5:20
8.	"Supersonic God"	Planet Anger	5:18
9.	"I Want You ...To Kill"	Downtime	8:14

== Accolades ==
Year	Publication	Country	Accolade	Rank
1995	CMJ New Music Monthly	United States	"Dance Top 25"	25
"*" denotes an unordered list.

== Personnel ==
Adapted from the Death Rave 2010 liner notes.

- Peter Stone – mastering
- tara ntula – cover art, design

== Release history ==
Region	Date	Label	Format	Catalog
United States	1994	21st Circuitry	CD	21C.CD06
