= More Like Me =

More Like Me may refer to:

- "More Like Me", a 1994 song by Hate Dept. from Meat.your.maker
- "More Like Me", a 2014 song by the Veronicas from The Veronicas
