= Disrepair (album) =

Studio album by LUXT
- Released: March 18, 1997
- Studio: Chalkhead Digital (Yuba City, CA)
- Genre: Industrial metal
- Length: 67:11
- Label: 21st Circuitry
- Producer: Anna Christine; Erie Loch

LUXT chronology
Jezebel Thirteen Three (1996)	Disrepair (1997)	Razing Eden (1998)

Disrepair is the second studio album by LUXT, released on March 18, 1997 by 21st Circuitry.

== Reception ==
Professional ratings
Review scores
Source	Rating
AllMusic	3/5 stars

AllMusic awarded Disrepair three out of five possible stars. Aiding & Abetting gave the album a more mixed review, praising the production but criticizing the songwriting and musicianship. Black Monday credited the album with being as good as Jezebel Thirteen Three and called the music "well produced and executed, maintaining a tarnished membrane while shining all the brighter." Last Sigh Magazine called the band provocative and emotional, saying "their blend of hard-synth and dark elektro-gothik style is worth hearing over and over again when you feel in the mood for spine tingling aural sensations." Sonic Boom called the album an improvement over its predecessor and said "the engineering and mixing quality is superb and as such all the electronics, guitars, and vocals all flow smoothly together."

== Track listing ==
All lyrics are written by Erie Loch, except "Winter Kills" by Alison Moyet; all music is composed by Anna Christine and Erie Loch, except "Winter Kills" by Alison Moyet.

No.	Title	Length
1.	"This Ugly"	3:16
2.	"Megaplex"	4:59
3.	"World of Hurt"	4:49
4.	"Hate Song"	5:13
5.	"Not of My Kind"	4:56
6.	"Devil's Advocate"	4:16
7.	"Intent"	5:27
8.	"Turbulence"	3:35
9.	"Death"	3:28
10.	"Noxxul"	3:22
11.	"Darker Times"	4:43
12.	"Locust"	6:01
13.	"Troll"	3:31
14.	"Winter Kills" (Yazoo cover)	4:16
15.	"Devil's Advocate" (Lo-Corps Mix)	5:20

== Personnel ==
Adapted from the Disrepair liner notes.

LUXT

- Anna Christine – bass guitar, keyboards, sampler, vocals, arrangements, production, engineering
- Erie Loch – guitar, keyboards, sampler, vocals, arrangements, production, engineering

Production and design

- Steven Seibold – bass programming, arrangements, production, recording, engineering and remixing (15)

== Release history ==
Region	Date	Label	Format	Catalog
United States	1997	21st Circuitry	CD	21C.22
