= Through With You =

Studio album by Slave Unit
- Released: April 8, 2014
- Genre: Industrial rock
- Length: 34:07
- Label: WTII
- Producer: Jason Bazinet; Chris Demarcus; Mike Welch

Slave Unit chronology
| Certificate of Participation (2009) | Through With You (2014) |

Through With You is the third studio album by Slave Unit, released on April 8, 2014, by WTII Records.

== Track listing ==
All tracks are written by Shawn Brice, Aki Sasaki and Mike Welch.

| No. | Title | Length |
|---|---|---|
| 1. | "Fuse" | 1:11 |
| 2. | "3" | 3:51 |
| 3. | "Indestructible" | 3:33 |
| 4. | "Rep.Resent" | 3:33 |
| 5. | "I Don't Care Anymore" | 3:17 |
| 6. | "Lordfly" | 4:41 |
| 7. | "Tamo (Push)" | 3:27 |
| 8. | "Lower" | 2:34 |
| 9. | "Typical" | 3:46 |
| 10. | "Euthanize" | 4:14 |

== Personnel ==
Adapted from the Through With You liner notes.

Slave Unit

- Shawn Brice – guitar, percussion, cover art, illustrations
- Aki Sasaki – bass guitar, percussion
- Mike Welch – lead vocals, programming, guitar, bass guitar, percussion, production

Production and design

- Jason Bazinet – production
- Chris Demarcus – production, mixing, mastering
- Ann Welch – photography

== Release history ==
| Region | Date | Label | Format | Catalog |
|---|---|---|---|---|
| United States | 2014 | WTII | CD, DL | 095 |
