= Sequencer (Covenant album) =

Studio album by Covenant
- Released: 1996
- Recorded: 1996
- Genres: EBM; electro-industrial; futurepop
- Length: 52:03 / 57:21 / 72:37
- Labels: Memento Materia, Metropolis

Covenant chronology
| Dreams of a Cryotank (1994) | Sequencer (1996) | Europa (1998) |

Singles from Sequencer
- 1. "Figurehead" Released: Oct 1995; 2. "Stalker" Released: 1996

Professional ratings
Review scores
| Source | Rating |
|---|---|
| AllMusic | 4/5 stars |

Sequencer, released in May 1996, is the second album by the Swedish musical group Covenant. In March 1997, a second edition by the name Sequencer: Beta was released, containing an additional track.

In the US, the album was released in 1997 on the 21st Circuitry label, and again in July 1999 on Metropolis Records. These releases both combine the original Sequencer album (minus "Luminal"), with the Stalker CD single, separated by an extra half-minute of silence after "Flux".

The first pressing on the Off Beat label had a mastering error in "Tabula Rasa". 250 discs were pressed before they stopped the production, and only 100 reached the record stores. They are now rare collector's items and can be identified by the orange cover art (while the art on the corrected Off Beat release is purple), the label Off Beat (as opposed to Metropolis Records), and a loud crack in the song "Tabula Rasa".

== Track listings ==
1996 original release
| No. | Title | Length |
|---|---|---|
| 1. | "Feedback" | 5:49 |
| 2. | "Stalker" | 5:28 |
| 3. | "Figurehead" | 8:41 |
| 4. | "Phoenix" | 5:16 |
| 5. | "Slow Motion" | 4:58 |
| 6. | "Tabula-Rasa" | 5:44 |
| 7. | "Storm" | 5:25 |
| 8. | "Flux" | 10:42 |
| Total length: | | 52:03 |

1997 "Beta" release
| No. | Title | Length |
|---|---|---|
| 8. | "Luminal" | 5:18 |
| 9. | "Flux" | 10:42 |
| Total length: | | 57:21 |

1997/1999 USA release
| No. | Title | Length |
|---|---|---|
| 8. | "Flux" | 11:13 |
| 9. | "Stalker" (Club Version) | 4:58 |
| 10. | "Stalker" (All Shapes Remix) | 5:07 |
| 11. | "Liquid Sky" | 4:40 |
| 12. | "Babel" | 5:18 |
| Total length: | | 72:37 |
