= New Ghost =

Studio album by Hate Dept.
- Released: August 27, 2013
- Genre: Industrial rock
- Length: 45:36
- Label: Awful Noise
- Producer: Steven Seibold

Hate Dept. chronology
DITCH (2003)	New Ghost (2013)

New Ghost is the fifth studio album by Hate Dept., released on August 27, 2013 by Awful Noise Records.

== Track listing ==
All tracks are written by Steven Seibold.

No.	Title	Length
1.	"Disconnector"	4:32
2.	"Already Over"	4:21
3.	"New Son Army"	4:44
4.	"Amanda Jones"	4:48
5.	"Hard Times (#1)"	4:49
6.	"Broken Rule"	4:19
7.	"Still Child"	5:02
8.	"Better Days"	4:24
9.	"Matrimonial Blood"	4:07
10.	"Subordinates"	4:26

== Personnel ==
Adapted from the New Ghost liner notes.

- Steven Seibold – lead vocals, programming, production

== Release history ==
Region	Date	Label	Format	Catalog
United States	2013	Awful Noise	CD, DL	ANRCD07
