= Form/Alkaline (album) =

Studio album by Scar Tissue
- Released: February 1, 2008
- Recorded: 1999 – 2003
- Genre: Electro-industrial
- Length: 45:48

Scar Tissue chronology
Rebuild (1998)	Form/Alkaline (2008)	Potential (2008)

Form/Alkaline is the fourth studio album by Scar Tissue, released independently on February 1, 2008. Formerly it had been self-released after 21st Circuitry Records dissolved in 2002 and then re-released as a digital download in 2008.

== Track listing ==
All tracks are written by Philip Caldwell and Steve Watkins.

No.	Title	Length
1.	"Explant"	3:31
2.	"Pball"	5:22
3.	"Estrogen"	2:48
4.	"Lazsik"	5:49
5.	"Fazemast"	5:04
6.	"Societies"	3:38
7.	"Radio North South"	4:00
8.	"Flak"	6:30
9.	"Alias"	3:51
10.	"Msg"	4:20
11.	"Tag"	0:55

== Personnel ==
Adapted from the Form/Alkaline liner notes.

Scar Tissue

- Philip Caldwell – programming, vocals
- Steve Watkins – programming, vocals

== Release history ==
Region	Date	Label	Format	Catalog
United States	2008	self-released	DL	
