= Chromasex Monkeydrive =

Studio album by LUXT
- Released: April 18, 2000
- Genre: Industrial metal
- Length: 68:15
- Label: Chalkhead
- Producer: Erie Loch

LUXT chronology
Razing Eden (1998)	Chromasex Monkeydrive (2000)	American Beast (2003)

Chromasex Monkeydrive is the fourth studio album by LUXT, released on April 18, 2000, by Chalkhead Records. Vocalist Anna Christine recommended the album highly among the artist's other work and described it as an enjoyable listen.

== Track listing ==
All lyrics are written by Erie Loch; all music is composed by Anna Christine and Erie Loch.

No.	Title	Length
1.	"Fiend"	4:56
2.	"Brutal"	5:05
3.	"Knock You Down"	5:23
4.	"Proof"	3:47
5.	"Genocide Skin"	4:26
6.	"No Turning Back"	5:30
7.	"User"	4:46
8.	"Vulgar Monkey Love"	4:40
9.	"Inside"	5:10
10.	"Blast Furnace"	5:15
11.	"Matthew 10:12"	4:49
12.	"Disobey"	5:23
13.	"Innocence Lost 2000"	3:37
14.	"Rain 1"	0:16
15.	"Rain 2"	0:16
16.	"Rain 3"	0:17
17.	"Wiccid"	4:37

== Personnel ==
Adapted from the Chromasex Monkeydrive liner notes.

LUXT

- Anna Christine – bass guitar, keyboards, sampler, vocals, executive-producer
- Crash – bass guitar
- David Hiscook – guitar
- Erie Loch – guitar, keyboards, sampler, vocals, production, engineering
- Frost Reed – drums

Additional performers

- Dik – electronics

== Release history ==
Region	Date	Label	Format	Catalog
United States	2000	Chalkhead	CD	CLK 17
