= Synergy (Covenant album) =

Synergy: Live in Europe

Live album by Covenant
- Released: October 8, 2002
- Recorded: March 2000 (Bochum, Germany)
- Genre: Electronic; synth-pop
- Length: 58:39
- Label: Metropolis, dependent
- Producer: Eskil Simonsson & Jürgen Jansen

Covenant chronology
United States of Mind (2000)	Synergy: Live in Europe (2002)	Northern Light (2002)

Professional ratings
Review scores
Source	Rating
Allmusic	link

Synergy: Live in Europe is the first live album by Covenant, released as a stand-alone CD in 2000, as well as a CD/VHS set by dependent.

== Track listing ==
No.	Title	Length
1.	"Intro" (Live)	1:50
2.	"Tour de Force" (Live)	4:31
3.	"Feedback" (Live)	4:15
4.	"Flux" (Live)	5:16
5.	"Helicopter" (Live)	5:45
6.	"Dead Stars" (Live)	6:20
7.	"Go Film" (Live)	4:55
8.	"Tabula Rasa" (Live)	5:44
9.	"I Am" (Live)	5:19
10.	"One World One Sky" (Live)	6:39
11.	"Der Leiermann" (Live)	5:56
12.	"Wall of Sound" (Live)	6:02
13.	"Stalker" (Live)	4:19
14.	"Babel" (Live)	5:56
Total length:		58:39

Box Edition VHS
No.	Title	Length
1.	"Intro" (Live Video)
2.	"Tour de Force" (Live Video)
3.	"I Am" (Live Video)
4.	"Helicopter" (Live Video)
5.	"Dead Stars" (Live Video)
6.	"Der Leiermann" (Live Video)
7.	"Theremin" (Live Video)
8.	"One World One Sky" (Live Video)
9.	"Figurehead" (Live Video)
