= American Beast =

Studio album by LUXT
- Released: January 14, 2003
- Genre: Industrial metal, nu metal
- Length: 57:03
- Label: Blackliner
- Producer: Anna Christine; Erie Loch

LUXT chronology
Chromasex Monkeydrive (2000)	American Beast (2003)

American Beast is the fifth studio album by LUXT, released on January 14, 2003, by Blackliner Records. Vocalist Anna Christine considers the album to be the band's best recording. LUXT disbanded in 2005 after the album's release due to divergent opinions in artistic direction, with vocalist Anna Christine wanting to become mainstream and the rest of the band preferring to remain in the underground scene.

== Reception ==
Professional ratings
Review scores
Source	Rating
Allmusic	4/5 stars

Allmusic critic Brian O'Neill said "American Beast comes off like Shirley Manson fronting Marilyn Manson: moody and with gothic overtones, but also quite metallic and loaded with Rammstein-inspired industrial-strength electronics as well." O'Neill also praised Anna Christine's vocals, saying "her voice is sultry and completely muliebral, whether singing about blow jobs (or not, since "Suck It Down" is probably a metaphor for something) or the pangs of anguish that one feels just trying to make it through the day." While agreeing on Christine's vocal prowess Exclaim! was also more mixed in its reception towards the music, saying "the guitars are average at best with their repetitive insipid cries" and "he samples are palatable and personable but not overly groundbreaking." Patrick Schabe of PopMatters welcomed the band's diverse musical palette and praised the integration of goth and techno elements in their compositions.

== Track listing ==
All lyrics are written by Erie Loch; all music is composed by Anna Christine and Erie Loch, except "Perpetusex", co-written with David Hiscook.

No.	Title	Length
1.	"American Beast"	3:55
2.	"How Lovely"	3:17
3.	"Cease"	4:15
4.	"Suck It Down"	5:19
5.	"Mary Megaladon"	3:01
6.	"Infinite"	4:56
7.	"Life Is Pain"	4:51
8.	"Archangel"	3:16
9.	"Jitter"	4:31
10.	"Folding"	3:15
11.	"Nerve"	3:41
12.	"Death"	5:23
13.	"Perpetusex" (Live Acoustic Version)	4:04
14.	"Suck It Down" (Wet Cookie Mix)	3:18

== Accolades ==
Year	Publication	Country	Accolade	Rank
1998	CMJ New Music Monthly	United States	Loud Rock: Crucial Spins	19
1998	CMJ New Music Monthly	United States	Loud Rock: College	32
1998	CMJ New Music Monthly	United States	CMJ Retail 100	91

== Personnel ==
Adapted from the American Beast liner notes.

LUXT

- Anna Christine – vocals, arrangements, production
- Crash – bass guitar
- David Hiscook – guitar, bass guitar, photography
- Erie Loch – guitar, bass guitar, drums, keyboards, programming, sampler, vocals, arrangements, production, engineering, remixing, photography
- Frost Reed – drums

== Release history ==
Region	Date	Label	Format	Catalog
United States	2003	Blackliner	CD	BL 06
