= Separator (album) =

Studio album by Scar Tissue
- Released: August 13, 1996
- Genre: Electro-industrial
- Length: 71:10
- Label: 21st Circuitry
- Producer: Steve Watkins

Scar Tissue chronology
Separator (1996)	TMOTD (1997)

Separator is the debut studio album of Scar Tissue, released on August 13, 1996, by 21st Circuitry. It contained mostly tracks recorded for the demo the band recorded previous to joining the label. The band's former lead singer departed before recording sessions for the album began.

== Reception ==
Aiding & Abetting praised the band for creating effective emotional atmosphere, saying "years after the fact, Scar Tissue has created a perfect soundtrack for Bladerunner." A critic at Last Sigh Magazine gave the album a mostly positive review, calling it "dark, threatening and heavily clad" and further saying that "there are many dark ominous sections within the releases here that flirt with a semi-lighter side of the electronic technology of sound." Sonic Boom also commended the material and said "Scar Tissue is a band not content to be contained within the fragile shell of a single musical style, preferring to exhibit their musical skills across a menagerie of genres." The album peaked at the twentieth position on CMJ's Dance Top 25.

== Track listing ==
All tracks are written by Scar Tissue.

No.	Title	Length
1.	"Powerclone"	3:10
2.	"Our Disease"	5:25
3.	"Recline"	3:31
4.	"Failure"	5:31
5.	"Pain Pinched Features"	3:59
6.	"Laundered"	6:32
7.	"Cold"	3:36
8.	"Asthmatic"	1:28
9.	"Chatter"	1:49
10.	"Splinterland"	2:15
11.	"Tamheran"	3:46
12.	"Gobstopper"	3:13
13.	"Stance"	6:15
14.	"Soil"	4:12
15.	"Choking on Fate"	5:43
16.	"Feeler"	4:00
17.	"Our Disease" (16 Volt Remix)	6:45

== Accolades ==
Year	Publication	Country	Accolade	Rank
1996	CMJ New Music Monthly	United States	"Dance Top 25"	20
"*" denotes an unordered list.

== Personnel ==
Adapted from the Separator liner notes.

Scar Tissue

- Philip Caldwell – guitar
- Steve Watkins – bass guitar, electronics, percussion, production, engineering, guitar (14), vocals (17)

Additional performers

- Seann Vowell (Dofino) – vocals (2, 3, 7, 15), tape (16)
- Alex Yang (as Theatre of Cruelty) – tape (16)

Production and design

- Nathan Moody – cover art, design

== Release history ==
Region	Date	Label	Format	Catalog
United States	1996	21st Circuitry	CD	21C.17
