= United States of Mind =

Studio album by Covenant
- Released: 2 March 2000
- Recorded: 1999
- Studio: Covenant, Helsingborg, Sweden
- Genre: Electronic; synth-pop
- Length: 57:24
- Label: Metropolis
- Producer: Eskil Simonsson, Joakim Montelius

Covenant chronology
| Europa (1998) | United States of Mind (2000) | Synergy: Live in Europe (2002) |

Singles from United States of Mind
- 1. "Tour de Force" Released: 25 Oct 1999; 2. "Dead Stars" Released: February 2000; 3. "Der Leiermann" Released: 13 January 2000

Professional ratings
Review scores
| Source | Rating |
|---|---|
| AllMusic | 3/5 stars |

United States of Mind is Covenant's fourth full-length album, released in March 2000. Travelogue was a bonus disc for United States of Mind. The track "You Can Make Your Own Music" is a silent track, in reference to John Cage's song "4′33″". "Like Tears in Rain" was re-recorded in German and released as the single "Der Leiermann", which also included the original version.

== Overview ==
The album's content finds the band united in a much more mainstream state of mind than any of their previous outings. For the most part, Covenant's typically harsh, staticky blasts of audio have been significantly smoothened out, flirting with the simple repetition of dance-pop on tracks with minimal lyrical content, and when present, lyrics often portray much more personal themes — with greater ambiguity — compared to the hostile manifestos of mankind's reality and the science fiction themes that pervade their earlier works. Some of the lyrics appear to be about reaching stardom, and the band even overflows with thanks to their fans on the liner notes. Sampled clips of dialogue, also usual on the early works, have been shed entirely save for the beginning of the gloom-bashing track "Humility". The track "You can make your own music" is a reference to the John Cage track 4'33".

== Track listing ==
All lyrics are written by Joakim Montelius, except where noted; all music is composed by Eskil Simonsson.

| No. | Title | Lyrics | Length |
|---|---|---|---|
| 1. | "Like Tears in Rain" | Simonsson | 5:51 |
| 2. | "No Man's Land" | Simonsson | 5:06 |
| 3. | "Afterhours" | Simonsson | 5:02 |
| 4. | "Helicopter" | | 5:44 |
| 5. | "Tour de Force" | | 4:46 |
| 6. | "Unforgiven" | | 4:43 |
| 7. | "Humility" | | 4:35 |
| 8. | "Dead Stars" (Version) | Simonsson | 4:50 |
| 9. | "One World One Sky" | Simonsson | 5:01 |
| 10. | "Still Life" | | 6:49 |
| 11. | "You Can Make Your Own Music" | | 4:33 |

Limited edition single "Travelogue"
| No. | Title | Length |
|---|---|---|
| 1. | "Fuzzy Logic" | 7:15 |
| 2. | "Humility V2" | 5:08 |
| 3. | "Alva Myrdal" | 5:18 |
| Total length: | | 17:41 |

== Covers ==
- In 2006 the U.S. Gothic Neo-Medieval/Neofolk band Unto Ashes covered One World One Sky on their album Songs For A Widow.
- Industrial band Goteki covered Tour de Force on their Stolen Thunder One EP.

== Personnel ==
=== Covenant ===
- Joakim Montelius – production (3–7, 10), engineering
- Clas Nachmanson
- Eskil Simonsson – vocals, production (1, 2, 8, 9), engineering, mixing

=== Technical personnel ===
- Bomb Tha' Dot – graphics
- Dirk Eusterbrock – band photos
- Egin Farcias – other photos
- Andreas Torkler – mastering

== Chart positions ==
| Chart (2000) | Peak position |
|---|---|
| German Albums (Offizielle Top 100) | 83 |
| German Alternative Charts (DAC) Top 50 Albums | 9 |
| CMJ RPM Charts (U.S.) | 4 |

The single for "Der Leiermann" ranked #2 on the DAC Top 100 Singles for 2000.
