= Northern Light (Covenant album) =

Studio album by Covenant
- Released: 8 October 2002
- Genres: Futurepop; synth-pop
- Length: 58:39
- Labels: Sony KA2; Metropolis
- Producer: Jacob Hellner

Covenant chronology
Synergy: Live in Europe (2002)	Northern Light (2002)	Skyshaper (2006)

Singles from Northern Light
- 1. "Bullet" Released: 9 Dec 2002; 2. "Call the Ships to Port" Released: 12 Aug 2002

Professional ratings
Review scores
Source	Rating
AllMusic	3/5 stars

Northern Light is Covenant's fifth full-length album, released by Sony KA2 (Europe) and Metropolis Records (US) in October, 2002. A limited edition digipak version of the album was also released, along with 1000 numbered double vinyl releases.

Sony copies of this record included copy-protection technology in an attempt to prevent consumers from digitizing their album.

== Track listing ==
No.	Title	Length
1.	"Monochrome"	5:00
2.	"Call the Ships to Port"	4:56
3.	"Bullet"	5:02
4.	"Invisible & Silent"	4:38
5.	"Prometheus"	5:40
6.	"We Stand Alone"	5:29
7.	"Rising Sun"	6:00
8.	"Winter Comes"	4:56
9.	"We Want Revolution"	4:44
10.	"Scared"	6:59
11.	"Atlas"	5:15

== Bonus tracks ==
The vinyl release included four bonus tracks, including two exclusive tracks.

1. Bullet (Club version) - 5:35
2. Call the Ships to Port (Club Version) - 6:04
3. Bullet (Funky Indian) - 5:38
4. Don't Go - 4:04

== Chart positions ==
Chart (2002)	Peak position
German Albums (Offizielle Top 100)	43
