= Bad Mojo =

1996 video game

- Original box art
- Developer: Pulse Entertainment
- Publishers: Acclaim Entertainment; Got Game Entertainment (redux)
- Platforms: Windows, Macintosh
- Release: Original: NA: February 23, 1996; UK: April 27, 1996; Redux: NA: December 9, 2004; EU: June 8, 2007
- Genre: Adventure
- Mode: Single-player

Bad Mojo is a 1996 adventure game developed by Pulse Entertainment and published by Acclaim Entertainment for Windows and Macintosh. The game follows Roger Samms, an entomologist who accidentally unleashes a curse (the titular bad mojo) that turns him into a cockroach. The storyline in Bad Mojo is loosely based on Franz Kafka's 1915 novella The Metamorphosis; Roger Samms' name is an imperfect anagram of the lead character's in Metamorphosis (Gregor Samsa), and a cat called Franz appears in the game. The gameplay consists of guiding the cockroach through a series of puzzles.

Got Game Entertainment re-released the game in December 2004 as Bad Mojo Redux, packaging it with a DVD containing a variety of extra material.

== Gameplay ==
The game begins in an underground hub with pipes to all the different rooms, which are sealed except one. By navigating from one room to another, the player unlocks the pipe to that room for easier backtracking. Roger is controlled solely using the directional arrow keys. As a cockroach, he can move small objects like cigarettes and bottle tops or weigh down precariously placed items.

In each room, there are hazards to avoid, lethal barriers to get around and puzzles to solve. The presence of hazards and ways to navigate to certain areas can be determined by observing other cockroaches. The player has four lives. A life is lost when Roger makes contact with anything deadly. When all lives are depleted, the player is sent back to the underground hub and must start the last room reached from the beginning (although the state of objects stays as the player last changed them).

A symbol of a flaming eye can often be found near living creatures, such as other cockroaches. Touching the eye causes the creature to provide hints to progress through visions and verse (voiced by Angelina). Background objects tell more about the characters and their history.

== Plot ==
In 1995, entomologist Roger Samms rents an apartment above a rundown bar owned by Eddie Battito. Roger has embezzled $1 million worth of research grant money from a science corporation he had previously worked for and is planning to leave for Mexico City to start a new life. After a small argument with Eddie, he remembers a trinket that he had gotten in his early childhood: a cockroach-patterned locket that belonged to his deceased mother, Angelina. Upon its discovery, the locket transforms Roger's soul into a cockroach and transports him to a sewer system connected to every section of the bar. His adventure takes him to the basement (which is also Eddie's bedroom), the bathroom, the kitchen, the bar room, Roger's room, and finally his research room. As Roger explores his world and faces dangers such as rats, garbage disposals, and his own pet cat Franz, he is guided by his mother's spirit, who serves as an oracle.

The game explores the past of both Roger and Eddie, revealing that Roger had been abandoned to an abusive nun, was the center of bullying as a young man, and was never taken seriously by his superiors. Eddie has had just as bad a life, having his beloved wife Angelina die during childbirth, giving up his son out of grief, and his livelihood stumbling. Eddie does not realize that Angelina was Roger's mother, nor does Roger know that Angelina was Eddie's wife. During Roger's exploration, he is forced to extinguish the pilot light to a gas stove in the kitchen to save a baby cockroach that, in turn, assists him in jamming the garbage disposal with a spoon. This act eventually causes the whole bar to be filled with gas. Roger must then set off a smoke detector to wake Eddie and then finally reach the locket in his own unconscious body's hand.

There are four possible endings to the storyline. If Eddie escapes and Roger doesn't (if Eddie is warned of the fire but Roger is left on the floor), Eddie ends up as a homeless drunk. If Roger escapes and Eddie doesn't, Roger tries to flee the country but is caught, charged with Eddie's murder, and remanded to an asylum for the criminally insane. If neither escape, the ghost of Angelina narrates, telling of the death of both men, the destruction of the bar for urban renewal, and that the ghosts of all three of them haunt the places where their dreams died. If both escape, Eddie recognizes the cockroach locket (that contains a photo of Angelina) and they reconcile as reunited father and son before both reveal the truths about their pasts. The family is reunited and they travel together to Mexico with the embezzled money, which Eddie uses to buy a new bar while Roger sets up a small lab to study roaches.

== Development ==
Bad Mojo's development was troubled: director Vinny Carrella noted that there was "a pall over the production" and "no happiness, just pain". The original designer Drew Huffman came up with the concept of having a small character in the gameplay due to the technical slowdowns on computers at the time. To begin with, the game was codenamed the "Booger Project". Huffman and Carella were brainstorming the game with Phill Simon taking inspirations from their experience with cockroach infestations, Franz Kafka's The Metamorphosis, and the 1946 film It's a Wonderful Life. The puzzles that were implemented focused on realism and the capabilities of a cockroach.

For graphics, the team used a mixture of CG and live action. It took a lot of study and modelling to get realistic looking roach graphics in the game animating the walk cycles frame by frame. About 720 screens in the game were produced. Parts of the cutscenes were created using Swivel 3D.

Some elements in the game required some specialists. A professional cat wrangler and trainer was hired to move the cat on the set and insurance was also required for the cat. The German cockroaches were provided by the Carolina Biological Supply Company. Controlling the roaches required a freezer to slow down their activity. The rat was caught and killed by an exterminator. Live catfish were bought from a fishmonger in Chinatown, San Francisco. During the production, a few animals were harmed, including a tarantula.

The game features a substantial electronic music soundtrack composed and performed by the American electro-industrial artist Xorcist, which has also written soundtracks for other CD-ROM games, notably Iron Helix.

== Release ==
By early 1996, a demo was released featuring a trailer, text plot and a short gameplay with only five screens of the basement.

The game was planned for the Sega Saturn. Shortly after the PC release, Acclaim Entertainment announced they would publish a port of the game for the Saturn. However, it went unreleased, and has not been confirmed that development ever began.

Got Game Entertainment re-released the game in December 2004 as Bad Mojo Redux. All in-game videos were remastered from original footage. Redux runs in truecolor only, opposed to the 1996 release which required only 256-color mode. This change makes the videos clearer and more colorful. The re-release also came with a bonus DVD, which contained a making-of, art galleries and other bonuses. This DVD was omitted from the UK release.

The game was distributed by Nightdive Studios, who released the game in the digital storefront Steam on July 3, 2014, while GOG.com added it to their store on May 22, 2014.

On 2019, Xorcist released a vinyl soundtrack of the game's score.

== Reception ==
Reception

Review scores
| Publication | Score |
|---|---|
| Computer Gaming World | 4/5 |
| Next Generation | 3/5 |
| PC Gamer (US) | 84% |
| PC Zone | 70% |
| MacHome Journal | 4.5/5 |
| PC Magazine | 4/4 |
| MacUser | 3.5/5 |
| PC Entertainment | A− |
| Macworld | 4/5 |
| Maximum | 3/5 |
| Computer Game Review | 84/100 |

Awards
| Publication | Award |
|---|---|
| PC/Computing | MVP Award Winner |
| Macworld | Game Hall of Fame |

According to co-producer Alex Louie, the original 1996 release of Bad Mojo was commercially successful. Following the game's launch, Macworld reported that it was "selling steadily." By February 1997, roughly 12 months after its release, its sales had reached 175,000 units. Louie said in 2004 that he was "pretty sure we sold over 200,000 units" by the end of Bad Mojo's shelf life. It also received accolades from critics. Inside Mac Games nominated Bad Mojo as its pick for 1996's best adventure game, but ultimately presented the award to Titanic: Adventure Out of Time. Conversely, the editors of Macworld gave Bad Mojo their 1996 "Best Role-Playing Game" award. Steven Levy of the magazine called it "an amazing experience". In 2011, Adventure Gamers named Bad Mojo the 30th-best adventure game ever released.

Arinn Dembo, writing for Computer Gaming World, gave the game 4 stars. MacAddict magazine gave the game its highest rating of "Freakin' Awesome", with reviewer Kathy Tafel praising the game's world as "rich" and saying that it was "both amusing and disgusting." A reviewer for Maximum opined that the game's unique and eerie story and presentation make it a compelling experience in spite of the limited gameplay. However, he felt that the lack of longevity was a major downside. A reviewer for Next Generation commented that "Bad Mojo isn't the best graphic adventure, but it's got something that counts a long ways - peculiarity. ... no other adventure has been as willing to show the savage gruesomeness of mankind's sloth."

The editors of PC Gamer US presented Bad Mojo Redux with their "Best Adventure Game 2004" award. Chuck Osborn of the magazine wrote that it "remains as inventive and resourceful as ever — and [is] ultimately better than any other adventure released this year."

The game was recognized as a cultural asset and selected for the permanent collection of Deutsches Literaturarchiv Marbach.
