= The Battle for Last Place =

Studio album by Slave Unit
- Released: April 3, 2007
- Genre: Industrial rock
- Length: 36:12
- Producer: Mike Welch

Slave Unit chronology
Slave Unit (1996)	The Battle for Last Place (2007)	Certificate of Participation (2009)

The Battle for Last Place is the second studio album by Slave Unit, released on April 3, 2007. It was released eleven years after the band's 1996 self-titled album.

== Reception ==
Fabryka Music Magazine lauded The Battle for Last Place and awarded it a four out of four, saying "Slave Unit may be considered as the best example and a turning point for bands which used to perform guitar driven music."

== Track listing ==
All tracks are written by Mike Welch, except "My Spine" by Maria Azevedo, Shawn Brice and Evan Sornstein.

No.	Title	Length
1.	"Expect Nothing"	4:33
2.	"Face No. 2"	3:40
3.	"Etched"	4:12
4.	"In Time"	3:10
5.	"In Your Defense"	3:27
6.	"Hope"	3:22
7.	"Go"	3:23
8.	"My Spine" (Battery cover)	3:59
9.	"Mold"	2:46
10.	"Just Being"	3:40

== Personnel ==
Adapted from The Battle for Last Place liner notes.

Slave Unit

- Mike Welch – lead vocals, guitar, bass guitar, sampler, programming, drums, percussion, production, engineering

Production and design

- Shawn Brice – cover art, illustrations
- Andrew Lindsay – illustrations

== Release history ==
Region	Date	Label	Format	Catalog
United States	2007	self-released	CD	SU 002
