= Dreams of a Cryotank =

Studio album by Covenant
- Released: December 1994
- Genre: EBM; electro-industrial
- Length: 75:08 / 73:40
- Label: Memento Materia
- Producer: Covenant

Covenant chronology
Dreams of a Cryotank (1994)	Sequencer (1996)

Dreams of a Cryotank is Covenant's debut full-length album. It was released in December 1994 by Memento Materia. For all USA releases, the track list was altered slightly. The first USA release was in 1997, and the subsequent re-release by Metropolis Records in 1999.

A limited collector's edition on vinyl records was re-released in 2012.

== Track listing ==
All tracks by Joakim Montelius & Eskil Simonsson except where noted #

No.	Title	Length
1.	"Theremin"	4:22
2.	"Replicant"	4:01
3.	"Shipwreck"	4:46
4.	"Void"	4:34
5.	"Hardware Requiem"	4:45
6.	"Shelter"	4:10
7.	"Wasteland"	3:50
8.	"Voices"	4:35
9.	"Edge of Dawn" (Mix)	4:32
10.	"Speed" (# Simonsson)	5:16
11.	"Cryotank Expansion: Dawn/Noon/Dusk/Night"	25:46
12.	"Theremin" (Club Edit)	4:31

US Release
No.	Title	Length
4.	"Painamplifier" (# Simonsson)	3:06

== Notes ==
- The original version of the album does not include the club edit of "Theremin".
- The original release has "Void" as the fourth track; the American releases replace it with "Painamplifier".
- American versions have "Edge of Dawn" marked as "mix", suggesting an alternate mix.
- The band Edge of Dawn named after the song with the same name.

== Personnel ==
- Eskil Simonsson – lead vocals, lead composition, engineering, production, synths
- Joakim Montelius – composition, production, synths, backing vocals
- Clas Nachmanson – engineering, production, synths, backing vocals
