= Iron Helix =

1993 video game

- Developer: Drew Pictures
- Publisher: Spectrum HoloByte
- Designer: Drew Huffman
- Composer: Peter Stone
- Platforms: Windows 3.1, Macintosh, Sega CD
- Release: 1993
- Genre: Adventure / Survival horror
- Mode: Single player

Iron Helix is a FMV adventure video game made for Windows, Macintosh, and the Sega CD. It was an early example of a CD-based game, including video elements integrated with conventional 2D maps and controls. The game was designed by Drew Pictures and distributed by Spectrum HoloByte, with Peter Stone of Xorcist creating the soundtrack as well as all sound design.

== Plot ==
Set far in the future, the human race is in the middle of a cold war with an alien race called the Thanatosians. During a target practice by an Earth fleet that will destroy an uninhabited planet, the heavy destroyer Jeremiah O'Brien is infected with an unknown virus that mutates the crew. No longer recognized due to the changes in their DNA, the O'Brien's security robot, simply known as "the Ship's Defender", assumes they are invaders and kills them. An apparent technical malfunction has caused the O'Brien's computer to believe that it was in a real life war situation, and select the planet Calliope as a target for destruction. Like all of the human fleet's Cerberus-class destroyers, the O'Brien carries a weapon known as "Iron Helix", which is capable of destroying all life on a planet in a single act. An attack on Calliope, a peaceful Thanatosian planet, would cause the war to go "hot".

The player is on board the scientific exploration ship Indiana, and is contacted by the Earth's forces in an attempt to stop the O'Brien, as it was the only ship nearby. As the ship is infected with the unknown virus, the player instead remotely controls a zoological robot that is sent over to explore. As much of the ship's systems are locked out using DNA detectors, the robot must collect uncontaminated samples of the crew's DNA to access different secured areas on board. The robot can also interface with dataports on the O'Brien to operate its systems, from opening doors to issuing executive commands.

== Gameplay ==
The game takes place in a screen divided into several sections. In the lower-left, taking up about 1/4 of the screen, is a simple control panel with buttons that move the robot in one of the four cardinal directions or up and down if it is located in a vertical shaft. The buttons light up to indicate which directions the robot can move from its current location. To the right is a small 2D map of the ship, showing the current level, or deck. Above this control panel is a small television-like display showing a 3D view as seen from the robot's point of view, taking up perhaps 1/5 of the display. To its right is a video panel that is used to replay videos gathered from the dataports. Between the two displays is a small control panel with buttons that operate the robot, scanning for DNA samples or accessing dataports.

The ship consists of several levels, or decks, connected vertically with an elevator and a ladder shaft. Operating the elevator notifies the security robot, so most of the time the player uses the shaft. Much of the game consists of an attempt to collect DNA samples that will allow access to other areas of the ship, where samples of higher-ranking crew members can be found. This process will eventually allow access to the bridge. In addition, the crew left several video recordings in the dataports that contain access codes needed to destroy the Defender through a variety of methods - crushing it or throwing it into space for instance. Once this is complete the player has five minutes before another Defender appears, during which they have to get to the bridge and set the ship to self-destruct. Like the mission to destroy the Defender, there are several ways to destroy the ship.

The game has several skill levels, which control how the security robot responds. On beginner level the security robot can be seen on the player's map, making it relatively easy to avoid, whereas at higher levels it is invisible. Operating the elevator will trigger it to approach the player's robot in beginner, while at higher levels operating any control will make it move. On the Advanced level the user must continually move in order to avoid it. The player has three probes (lives) to complete the game, and loses if all three are destroyed or time runs out.

Unlike the original PC version, the Sega CD version displays an additional video sequence at the end of the game. After finally disabling the defender droid and destroying the Jeremiah O'Brian, the player is brought back to Starbase Amethyst expecting to be greeted as a hero for saving the world and stopping the war. Instead the player is brought to an interrogation room. The game ends with the player being locked in a chair while being tortured and interrogated by a Commanding Officer of Earth Force (the same that has been advising the player the entire time) about the player's knowledge of project Iron Helix.

== Development ==
The inspiration for creating the game came from the atmosphere of the SS Jeremiah O'Brien ship. Developer Drew Huffman had many issues to consider in the game's creation, especially fitting the game on to portable storage devices and decided the game would be a CD-Rom game. A utility used to develop the game was Macromind Director. Another issue was the long loading times between animation. QuickTime was insufficient for the game, so Drew made use of the PACo engine from the Company of Science and Art. The game was made by 15 people and it took 13 months to develop it.

== Reception ==
Reception

Review score
Publication	Score
Electronic Entertainment	8 out of 10

Computer Gaming World in November 1993 praised the Macintosh version of Iron Helix's "incredibly fast" speed given the use of CD-ROM. The magazine stated that the game had "first-rate, realistic" graphics and sound, and that the five difficulty levels provided "excellent replay value", and concluded that Iron Helix offered "an intensely satisfying experience". In April 1994 the magazine said, however, that when the game's "several hours of intense, strategic duck n' jive against an aggressive and efficient opponent ... there is very little replay value". A 1994 survey of strategic space games set in the year 2000 and later gave the game three-plus stars out of five, also praising the graphics and wishing for more replay value. GamePro in 1995 gave the Sega CD version a positive review, saying it successfully translated the PC game to a home console experience. They highly praised Iron Helix's realistic graphics, slow-paced and suspenseful gameplay, and eerie atmosphere, remarking that "You really feel like you're in a lifeless, mechanical starship." Derek Pearcy from Pyramid commented: "There is no doubt that Iron Helix, with its relatively quick action, vivid realism and dynamic controls, is an interesting game -- the question is whether or not you will find yourself enveloped in an interesting story, as you race to uncover its mysteries."

Iron Helix was named Best Strategy Game at the 1994 Codie awards.

The game sold 500,000 copies.

== Legacy ==
Much of the development team of Iron Helix went on to work on Bad Mojo, which includes a (digitally reproduced) print advertisement for Iron Helix as an Easter egg.
