= Death Rave 2000 (compilation) =

Compilation album by Various artists
- Released: September 28, 1993
- Genre: Techno
- Length: 17:23
- Label: 21st Circuitry

Newer Wave series chronology
Death Rave 2000 (1993)	Death Rave 2010 (1994)

Death Rave 2000 is a various artists compilation album released on September 28, 1993 by 21st Circuitry.

== Reception ==
Factsheet Five praised the authenticity of Death Rave 2000 and its fusion of disco and industrial music, calling the album "a happy medium between the two extreme forms of electronic music." A critic at Option said "this compilation seems like a simulacrum of what a collection of good, aggressive rave tracks should be."

== Track listing ==
Side one
No.	Title	Artist	Length
1.	"Put the Music On"	Metatron	4:18
2.	"Tolerance"	A Sound Thrashing	4:48

Side one
No.	Title	Artist	Length
1.	"Juice Dawg"	Smashing Atoms	4:18
2.	"Oh Lord God"	Speed Genius Overdose	4:19

CD track listing
No.	Title	Artist	Length
1.	"Put the Music On"	Metatron	4:20
2.	"Tolerance"	A Sound Thrashing	4:49
3.	"Juice Dawg"	Smashing Atoms	3:44
4.	"Oh Lord God"	Speed Genius Overdose	4:20
5.	"RNA Degeneration" (Ver. 1.0)	DIDM-X	4:44
6.	"Holy Babel" (Receptor Mix)	Non-Aggression Pact	5:28
7.	"Konfusion"	A Sound Thrashing	4:16
8.	"Channel 10"	Gracious Shades	2:11
9.	"Razor"	Non-Aggression Pact	4:36

== Personnel ==
Adapted from the Death Rave 2000 liner notes.

- Atro.City – illustrations
- Peter Eckart – mastering
- tara ntula – illustrations

== Release history ==
Region	Date	Label	Format	Catalog
United States	1993	21st Circuitry	CD	21C.CD21
