= Covenant (band) =

Swedish electronic band

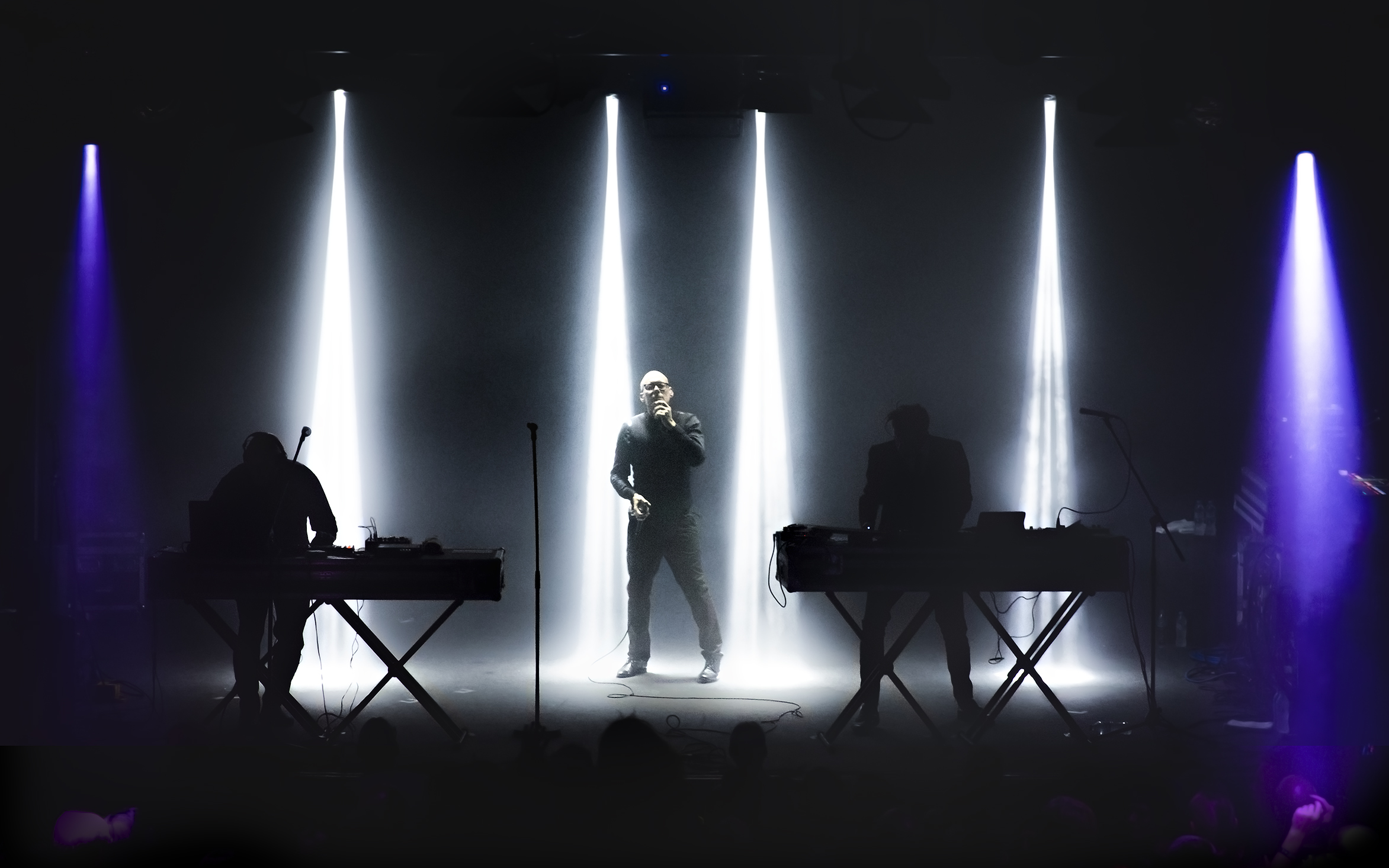
- Covenant performing live at Amphi Festival in 2018

Background information
- Origin: Helsingborg, Sweden
- Genres: Electronic; EBM; dance-pop; synth-pop
- Years active: 1986–present
- Labels: 21st Circuitry; dependent; Memento Materia; Metropolis; Off Beat; Sony Ka2; SubSpace; Synthetic Symfony/SPV
- Members: Eskil Simonsson; Daniel Jonasson; Daniel Myer
- Past members: Joakim Montelius; Clas Nachmanson; Andreas Catjar-Danielsson (†)
- Website: www.covenant.se

Covenant is a Swedish electronic band formed in Helsingborg in 1986. The band is currently composed of Eskil Simonsson and Joakim Montelius in the studio, while live shows consist of Simonsson along with touring members Chad Hauger, Daniel Jonasson and Daniel Myer of Haujobb.

Their music comprises a mixture of synthpop and electronic body music. They have been releasing music since the early 1990s.

== History ==
In the late 1970s and early 1980s, electronic music and several of its subgenres became a preferred musical style among European underground culture. It gained favor initially within major cities and eventually trickled into the continent's more secluded regions. This new wave of music was discovered at different instances by a group of friends living in Helsingborg, a scenic town in south western Sweden. Eskil Simonsson, Joakim Montelius, and Clas Nachmanson, three teenagers with mutual, youthful curiosities for science, philosophy, and matters of existence, were all enthralled by the unique presentation and the emotional content of the music, specifically by that of bands such as Kraftwerk, The Human League, Depeche Mode, Front 242, and Nitzer Ebb. It was after attending the first Front 242 show in Scandinavia that the trio and others familiar to them decided to start a band. The group's formative influences also included D.A.F., Skinny Puppy, and OMD.

The friends carried this fascination with them to university life in the historic town of Lund, approximately 50 kilometres (31 mi) southeast of Helsingborg. In between their academic endeavors and discussions of worldly affairs, they assembled a small recording studio in Nachmanson's bedroom and began to experiment with their own musical compositions. In 1988, the name "Covenant" was selected for the group—a name derived from the unspoken spiritual bond the trio professed to share.

As Covenant, the three produced their first publicly released track, "The Replicant", by invitation of Swedish record label Memento Materia. "The Replicant" was released on a compilation album in 1992, and the track thrilled label executives, prompting them to ask for a full album. In 1994, the group compiled enough songs to release the album, which became Dreams of a Cryotank. It was well received by critics and fans alike, and with its success, the boyhood friends decided to take their musical efforts more seriously. They upgraded and added more equipment, relocated their studio, and committed to tour.

In 1995, Covenant performed at a festival in Germany at the request of Off-Beat Records. The band impressed Off-Beat's attending A&R representative, who signed them to a record deal the following day. Excited by the prospect of broader exposure, the band members eased further away from their educational pursuits and devoted themselves to completing a new album, 1996's Sequencer. Later in 1996, the band released the "Stalker" single before embarking on a tour with Haujobb and Steril across Germany, Belgium, and Holland.

With Sequencer, the band sought to improve upon the weaknesses they found in Dreams by combining sequencing, diverse melodies, and commanding lyrics. It became an instant classic among many observers, some of whom boldly declared it "the best electro album of the decade." It would go on to be re-released a number of times throughout the world and remains a club favorite in many settings.

Later in the year, San-Francisco-based record label 21st Circuitry agreed to distribute Covenant's albums in the United States, expanding the band's reach in the process. As a result, the group created the Theremin EP in 1997 specifically for North American release and started to accept tour dates throughout the US and Canada.

The trio's third full-length album, Europa, debuted in 1998. Europa carried Covenant's initially aggressive, often distorted brand of music into the beat-driven realm of synth pop, marking the beginning of a gradual evolution in the band's collective sound. In the US, the album peaked at #101 on the CMJ Radio Top 200 and reached #3 on the CMJ RPM charts. Also in 1998, they sued the Norwegian black metal/Industrial metal band The Kovenant (then known as Covenant) for the rights to the name "Covenant", arguing that they had established use of the name first and forcing the Norwegian band to change the spelling of their name.

Covenant spent 1999 touring, changing record labels, and on the preparation of another album. Off-Beat Records went out of business, and Dependent was created by former Off-Beat employees. Together with a few selected former Off-Beat acts, Covenant joined Dependent. In addition, Covenant were signed with SubSpace Communications in Sweden, effectively ending their tenure with Memento Materia. Meanwhile, 21st Circuitry Records ceased operations, leading the three to find a new home in America with Metropolis Records (Metropolis had bought the rights to the 21st Circuitry back catalogue). Shortly thereafter, the band's first three albums and the Theremin EP were re-issued in the US under the Metropolis label.

United States of Mind was released in 2000, and with it, Covenant's tendencies strayed further into synth pop. Also released that year was a stand-alone single, "Der Leiermann" It was a version of the German Art song of the same name, but sung to the tune of the album track '"Like Tears in Rain". "Der Leiermann" was originally a poem by Wilhelm Müller, set to music by Franz Schubert as part of the poem cycle "Die Winterreise". S. Alexander Reed asserts that this point in Covenant's career marks a distinct break from previous work in an attempt to project a sense of the "sublime built on wonder, rather than abjection."

A live album, Synergy, was released later in the year which featured tracks from the band's first four albums. The group continued with 2002's Northern Light, which they portrayed as having a more sombre, cold sound in comparison to their earlier offerings. In another transition between labels, the European release of Northern Light was handled by Sony Music's Ka2 division rather than Dependent or Subspace. The US release was through Metropolis.

Whilst they continued to produce music together, Montelius and Simonsson took up residence in separate countries; Montelius residing in Barcelona, Spain, and Simonsson living in Berlin, Germany. Nachmanson remained in Helsingborg.

Covenant released their sixth studio album, Skyshaper, in March 2006 to an overall positive reception. The band toured Europe prior to the album's release and toured the United States beginning in September 2006.

In March 2007, Covenant announced that Nachmanson would not be touring with the band and his replacement would be Daniel Myer of Haujobb. In an interview with Side-Line magazine, Covenant's Joakim Montelius said he was not sure if Clas would still continue with Covenant.

In October 2007, Covenant released the road movie In Transit on DVD. It contained material from the world tour undertaken in support of the album Skyshaper and documented the band's travels in Europe, North America, South America and across Russia over a period of 18 months. The band confirmed Clas' departure in the DVD documentary.

In January 2011, Covenant released their seventh studio album, Modern Ruin — the first album by the band with Myer as a core member. The band released a new EP, Last Dance in June 2013. The band released their new album, Leaving Babylon, in September 2013.

In April 2015, the band embarked on a North American tour to promote Leaving Babylon. The band, joined on tour by opening band The Labrynth, performed in approximately 20 cities, including Los Angeles, New York, Washington, D.C., and Austin, Texas. Slug Magazine favorably reviewed the 6 April show in Salt Lake City, describing Covenant's stage presence as "exquisite" and "just as powerful as their music."

In October 2015, Covenant headlined the Gothic Meets Klassik festival in Leipzig, Germany, along with British synthpop band Mesh and songwriter and electronic musician Anne Clark.

In November 2016, they released their ninth studio album The Blinding Dark. It was accompanied by a tour in Europe and, in 2018, the UK. and the US.

In February 2019, the band commenced a ten-city tour through Germany, starting in Berlin on 7 February. Concert attendees were offered a new extended play record called Fieldworks: Exkursion EP. It featured five tracks, each written by a member of the band, and one song in collaboration with French electro-industrial newcomer Grabyourface, who also performed opening sets during the band's German tour that year. According to the band's Facebook page, this EP is intended to be the first of an upcoming cycle of records associated with the "Fieldworks" theme. The new music was inspired in part by sounds collected at an electricity plant, according to an interview conducted by a writer for the magazine Zero. "This time we wanted to use the sounds we have collected for many years, from exotic places on the six continents we have visited as a band, as well as the mundane hum of everyday life, as stepping stones for the songs," Joakim Montelius explained in an interview published on Gruftbote.

The band headlined the final day of the Terminus Festival in Calgary on 28 July 2019 and then embarked on a set of five U.S. shows in Seattle (30 July), Portland (31 July), Los Angeles (2 August), Oakland (4 August), and Denver (6 August).

== Personnel ==
=== Current members ===
- Eskil Simonsson – lead vocals, keyboards, programming, drums (1986–present)
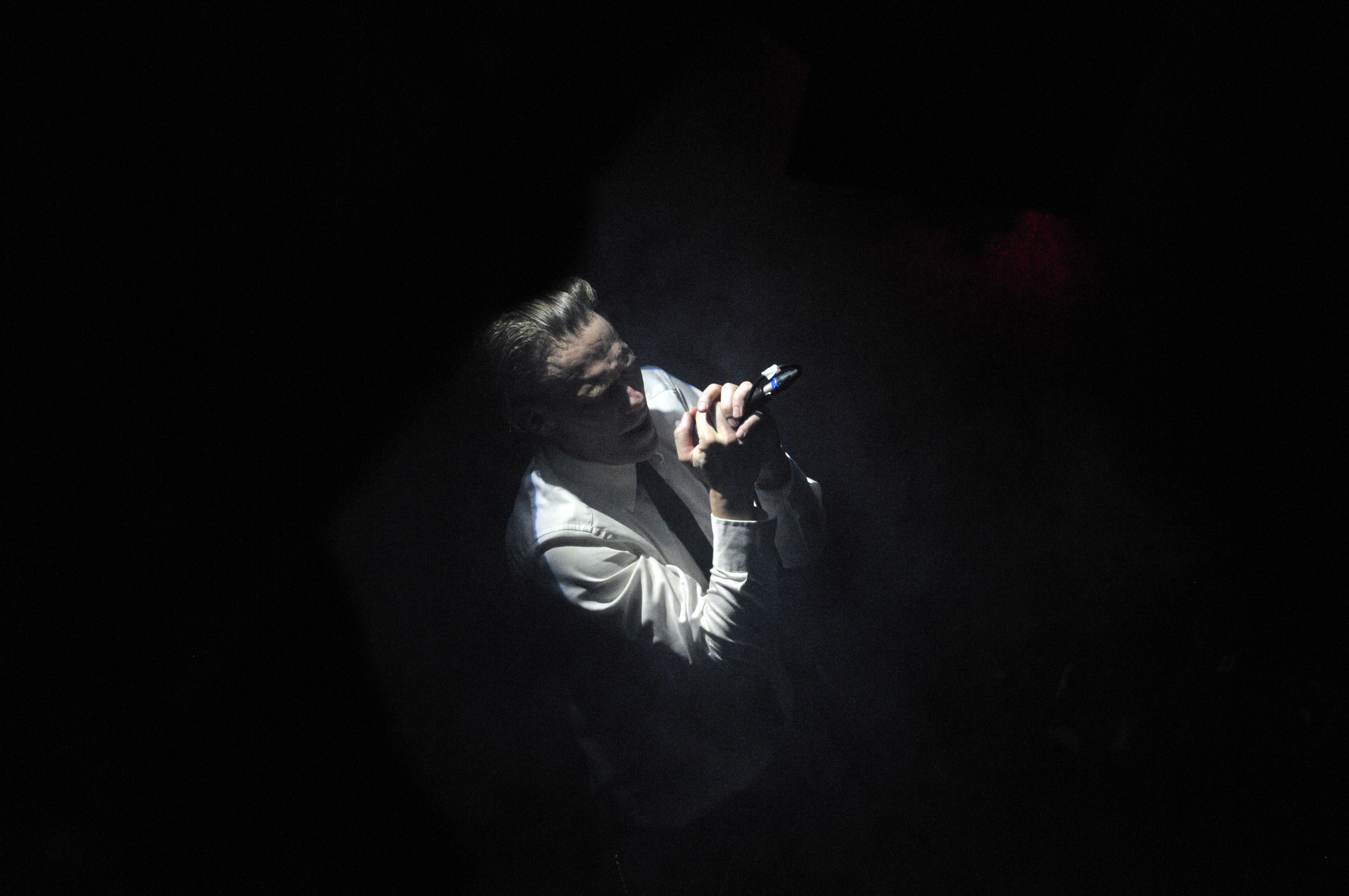
  Eskil solo at o2 Islington
- Daniel Jonasson – keyboards, backing vocals (2011–present)
- Daniel Myer – keyboards, backing vocals (2006–2012, 2016–present)

=== Former members ===
- Joakim Montelius – keyboards, backing vocals, programming (1986–present, studio only since 2010)
- Clas Nachmanson – keyboards, backing vocals, programming (1986–2007)
- Andreas Catjar – keyboards, guitars (2013–2024; his death)
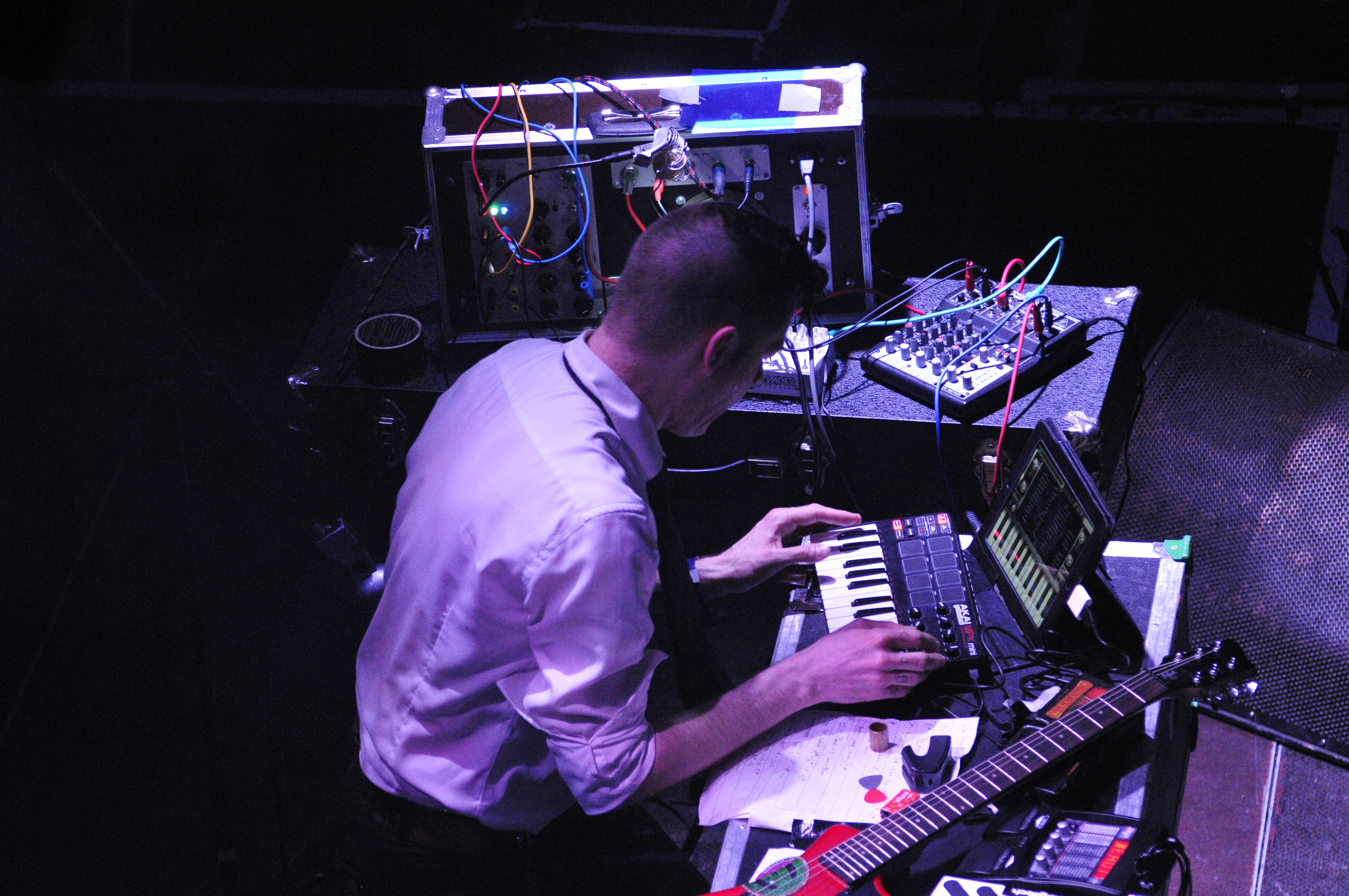
  Catjar on keyboards at o2 Islington

== Discography ==
=== Studio albums ===
- Dreams of a Cryotank (December 1994)
- Sequencer (May 1996; March 1997, 2nd ed.; July 1999, US version)
- Europa (April 1998)
- United States of Mind (February 2000) – #9 DAC Top 50 Albums Charts, Germany
- Northern Light (September 2002)
- Skyshaper (March 2006) – #4 DAC Top 50 Album Charts, Germany
- Modern Ruin (January 2011)
- Leaving Babylon (September 2013)
- The Blinding Dark (November 2016)

=== Live albums ===
- Synergy (November 2000)
- In Transit (October 2007)

=== Singles and EPs ===
- Figurehead (October 1995)
- Stalker (December 1996)
- Theremin EP (1997)
- Final Man (February 1998)
- Euro EP (October 1998) – #18 CMJ RPM Charts, U.S.; #34 DAC 1999 Singles Charts, Germany
- It's Alright (November 1999)

A single which was released on vinyl record and limited to 500 copies.

- Tour De Force (December 1999) – #4 DAC 1999 Singles Charts, Germany
- Der Leiermann (January 2000) – #2 DAC 2000 Singles Charts, Germany

Released simultaneously with the Dead Stars single in Germany.

- Dead Stars (February 2000)
- Travelogue (February 2000)

Included in the United States of Mind box set.

- Call The Ships To Port (August 2002) – #93 Offizielle Deutsche Charts, Germany
- Bullet (December 2002)
- Ritual Noise (January 2006) – #64 Offizielle Deutsche Charts #64; #1 DAC Singles
- Brave New World (September 2006) – #1 DAC Singles
- Lightbringer (feat. Necro Facility) (October 2010)
- Last Dance (June 2013)
- Sound Mirrors (August 2016)
- Fieldworks: Exkursion EP (February 2019)
- Andreas E.P. (October 2025)

==== Theremin ====
Theremin is an EP released by Covenant in 1997 by the American label 21st Circuitry. It compiled tracks which were, for the most part, previously unavailable in the US. It was re-released by Metropolis in July 1999.

Theremin EP track listing
No.	Title	Length
1.	"Theremin" (Club Version)	4:31
2.	"Figurehead" (Plain)	4:45
3.	"Speed" (Club Version)	5:47
4.	"Voices" (Optocoded)	4:44
5.	"Void" (Doac Version)	4:34
6.	"Theremin" (US Remix)	5:47
7.	"Speed" (Optodecoded)	4:43
Total length:		34:51

- Track 1 was previously released on the German and American releases of Dreams of a Cryotank.
- Tracks 2, 3, 4, and 7 were previously released on the Figurehead EP.
- Track 5 was previously released on the Swedish and German releases of Dreams of a Cryotank.
- Track 6 was new to this release.

=== Other releases ===
- United States of Mind Limited Box (February 2000)

A boxset which included United States of Mind and the Travelogue single.

- Synergy Limited Box (November 2000)

A boxset which included Synergy, a booklet with live pictures and lyrics for every released Covenant song, a band interview on VHS cassette tape, a "Bloody Mary" recipe, and seven live recorded tracks; limited to 4000 copies.

- Bullet DVD (January 2003)

A DVD featuring a music video for the song "Bullet" along with making of footage.

- Project Gotham Racing 4 Soundtrack (November 2005)

The band contributed the Skyshaper track "20 Hz" to a compilation which included other rock and electronic artists (listed here).

- Festival Soundtrack (2001)

Playing at a concert visited by one of the main characters

- Wir sind die Nacht Soundtrack (2010)

Music for a club scene (released also on the limited edition of their 2011 album Modern Ruin)

=== Music videos ===
- "Stalker" (1996)
- "Call the Ships to Port" (2002)
- "Bullet" (2002)
- "Happy Man" (2006)

== See also ==
- Schaffel music
