= Slave Unit (album) =

Studio album by Slave Unit
- Released: August 1996
- Studio: The Fringe (Oakland, CA)
- Genre: Industrial rock
- Length: 40:09
- Label: COP Int'l.
- Producer: Shawn Brice; Torsten Hartwell; Rey Osburn; Mike Paikos; Alan Sartirana; Mike Welch

Slave Unit chronology
Slave Unit (1996)	The Battle for Last Place (2007)

Slave Unit is the debut studio album of Slave Unit, released in August 1996 by COP International. Reyka Osburn of Tinfed performed live drums on tour and on the album.

== Reception ==
Larry Miles of Black Monday praised the performances and production of Slave Unit and called it "THE electro-punk monster that is the industrial alternative." Sonic Boom was impressed by the band's mix of punk, industrial, and tribal percussion and compared the band favorably to Rage Against the Machine. Fabryka Music Magazine also commended the music's fusion of genres and awarded the album a three out of four, describing it as "simple and concrete."

== Track listing ==
All tracks are written by Torsten Hartwell, Rey Osburn, Mike Paikos, Alan Sartirana and Mike Welch, except "Values Here" by Brian Baker and Dave Smalley.

No.	Title	Length
1.	"Deadweight Loss"	3:06
2.	"Back Down"	4:16
3.	"Values Here" (Dag Nasty cover)	4:07
4.	"Slow Time"	4:31
5.	"Stuck"	5:19
6.	"Frostbite" (Sterile Mix)	4:04
7.	"Think"	2:51
8.	"Shadow"	3:57
9.	"Life Unfolds"	5:59
10.	"Chick Pea 14"	1:59

== Personnel ==
Adapted from the Slave Unit liner notes.

Slave Unit

- Torsten Hartwell – bass programming, production
- Rey Osburn – live drums, production
- Mike Paikos – guitar, production
- Alan Sartirana – guitar, production
- Mike Welch – lead vocals, programming, sequencing, percussion, guitar, production

Additional performers

- Maria Azevedo – lead vocals (4)

Production and design

- Robert Bilensky – illustrations
- Shawn Brice – production
- Stefan Noltemeyer – mastering
- Evan Sornstein – design

== Release history ==
Region	Date	Label	Format	Catalog
United States	1996	COP Int'l.	CD	COP 022
