= Meat.your.maker =

meat.your.maker

Studio album by Hate Dept.
- Released: October 1994
- Genre: Industrial rock
- Length: 34:43
- Label: 21st Circuitry
- Producer: Steven Seibold

Hate Dept. chronology
meat.your.maker (1994)	Mainline E.P. (1995)

meat.your.maker is the debut studio album by Hate Dept., released in October 1994 by 21st Circuitry.

== Reception ==
Keyboard praised meat.your.maker for being "raw and accessible" and the band for experimenting with their arrangements. Aiding & Abetting gave it a mixed review, saying "there is much more texture underlying everything than the current trend-setters have" but "as aggressive industrial goes, this is pretty wimpy musically' and that "the beats often sound like they came off a Casio sampler, and the guitars are never allowed to really dominate." Factsheet Five said "although Hate Dept. uses some rather trite subject matter for industrial songs (e.g. child pornography, sex aversion, samples from Blade Runner), they do their thing so well that I just don't care."

== Track listing ==
All tracks are written by Steven Seibold.

No.	Title	Length
1.	"Beat Me Up"	3:05
2.	"Start Digging"	4:09
3.	"Acid Drops"	4:21
4.	"Drew"	4:03
5.	"Defensive"	3:30
6.	"Drive:a"	3:03
7.	"Bored & Stupid"	3:09
8.	"I Am Truth"	3:13
9.	"Kick You"	3:07
10.	"More Like Me"	3:17

== Personnel ==
Adapted from the meat.your.maker liner notes.

Hate Dept.

- Coby Bassett – guitar, vocals
- Dean Love – keyboards, vocals
- Steven Ortiz – drums, vocals
- Steven Seibold – lead vocals, programming, keyboards, guitar, production

Additional performers

- James Agnew – keyboards, guitar, vocals
- Charles Hunt – drums, vocals
- Rob Robinson – keyboards, guitar
- Robert Tomchak – keyboards, vocals
- Timothy Wiles (as Q) – keyboards, vocals

Production and design

- Curium Design – design

== Release history ==
Region	Date	Label	Format	Catalog
United States	1994	21st Circuitry	CD	21C.08
