= Steril =

German band

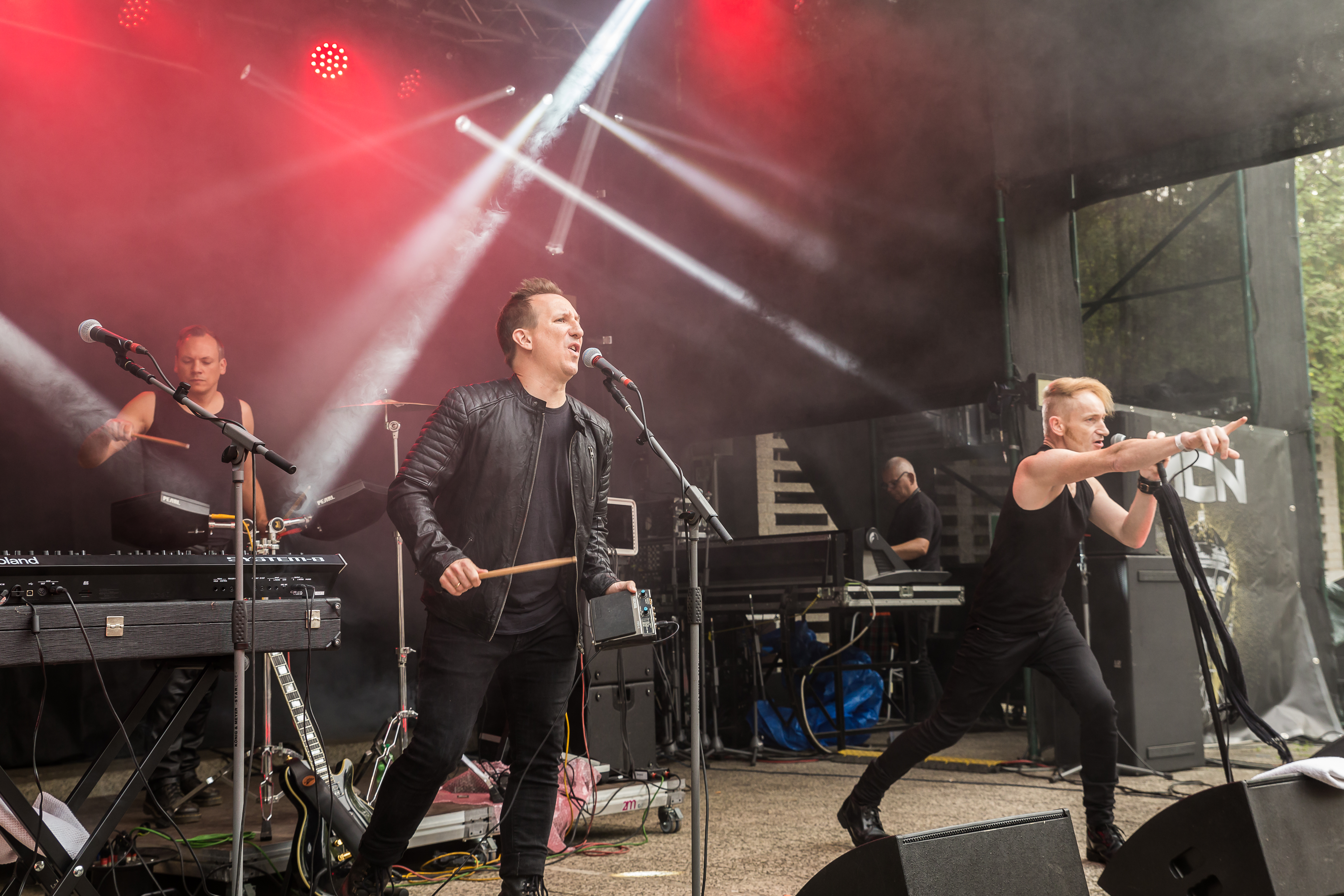
- Steril live at Nocturnal Culture Night 2018 in Germany

Background information
- Origin: Oldenburg, Germany
- Genres: Industrial, EBM
- Years active: 1989–
- Labels: Artoffact; Off Beat; StrangeWays Records
- Members: Mähne Meenen; Axel Tasler; Jan Wilking

Steril is a German electro-industrial/alternative electronic band founded in 1989 in Oldenburg. Together with bands like Front Line Assembly, Project Pitchfork and Download Steril made the Off Beat Label the biggest independent label for electronic music in Germany.

Besides many appearances on electronic/EBM/industrial compilations, Steril has its own catalogue counting 5 full length cds and a couple of maxi singles.

Over the last decade, the sound of Steril has been influenced by the developments in the industrial electronic genre. Nevertheless, a Steril track from 1994 is as recognizable as a track from 2006. Steril combines club beats, complex arrangements and aggressive guitar riffs.

Sterils underground success in Germany soon spilled out over the borders, where its whole catalogue was licensed to 21st Circuitry (US) and Westcom (UK). Hits like "No Remission", "Egoist" and "Deep" were well received in the US and UK, Portugal, Brazil and Australia.

Outside the studio, Steril has been known to give energetic live shows. In 1996, they toured Germany with Haujobb and Covenant, and in 2014 they supported Front 242 on some dates in Germany.

After a long studio silence, Steril reappeared in 2003 with its album Purification. The album contained 11 tracks combining ambient, rave, hip-hop, metal, pop and electronica. The album was in the German Top 20 (DAC) for many weeks. STERIL signed at StrangeWays Records in Hamburg (Wolfsheim, Boytronic, Sparks, Goethes Erben, etc.).

== Line up ==
- Mähne Meenen (Vocals)
- Axel Tasler (Guitars & Programming)
- Jan Wilking (Keyboards & Programming)

Live supported by

- Andreas Ruest (Drums)
- Hauke Dressler (Mixing)

== Gallery ==
Steril, Line-up live at Nocturnal Culture Night 2018 in Deutzen, Germany

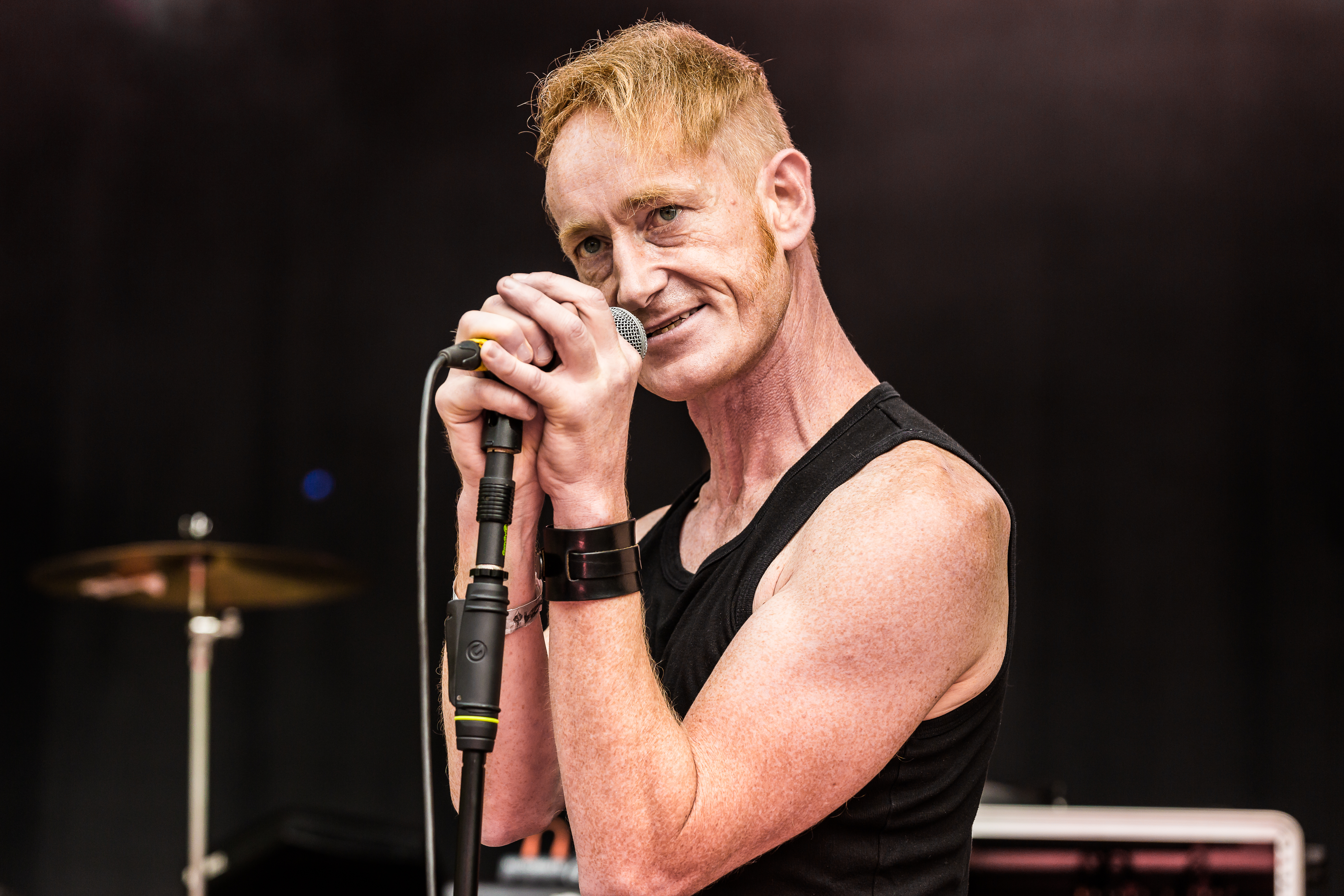
Singer Mähne Meenen

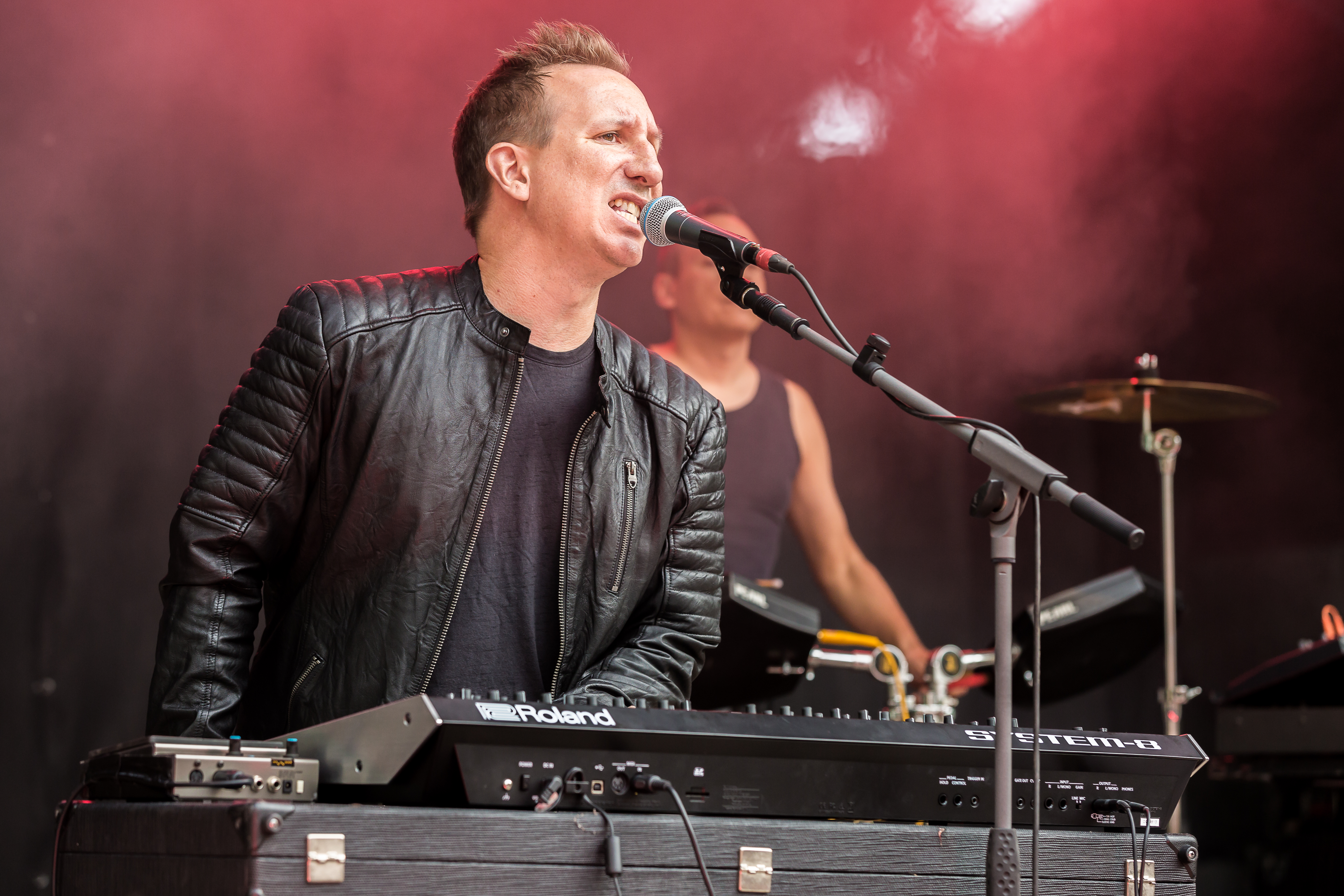
Guitarist and programmer Axel Tasler

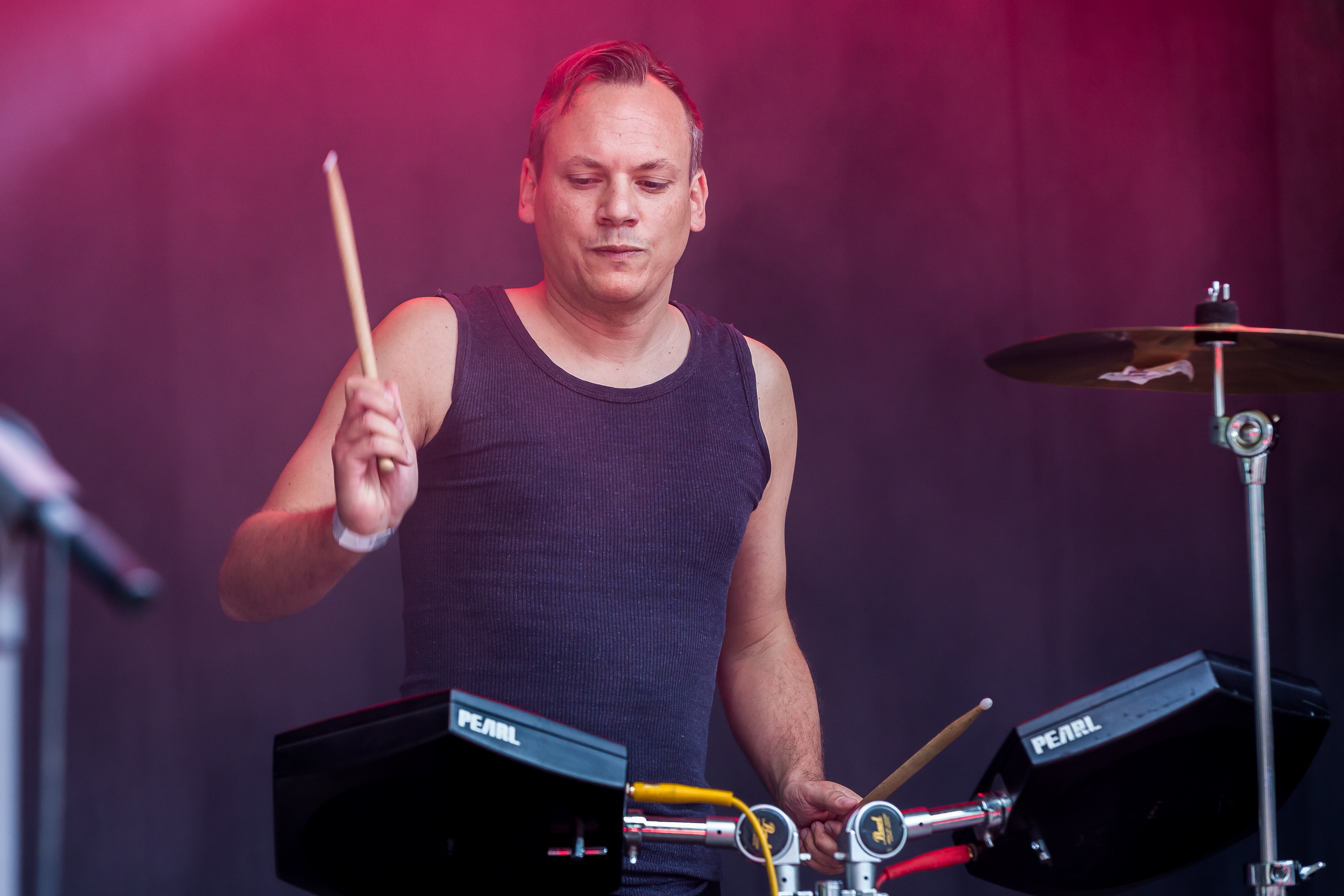
Keyboarder and programmer Jan Wilking

== Discography ==
- Empiricism (2019, Frankahdafi Records)
- Misanthrop (2016, Frankahdafi Records)
- Realism (2006, Artoffact)
- 400 Years of Electronic Music (2006, Artoffact)
- Purification (2003, Artoffact)
- Venustrap (1996, Artoffact)
- Egoism (1996, 21st Circuitry)
- Transmission Pervous (1995, 21st Circuitry)
