= Skyshaper =

Studio album by Covenant
- Released: March 2006
- Genres: Futurepop; synth-pop
- Length: 53:21
- Label: Metropolis

Covenant chronology
Northern Light (2002)	Skyshaper (2006)	Modern Ruin (2011)

Singles from Skyshaper
- 1. "Ritual Noise" Released: 20 Jan 2006; 2. "Brave New World" Released: 10 Oct 2006

Professional ratings
Review scores
Source	Rating
AllMusic	3/5 stars

Skyshaper is Covenant's sixth studio album. It was released in Europe by Synthetic Symphony / SPV on 2006 March 3 and in the United States by Metropolis Records on 2006 March 7. It reached No. 44 in the German mainstream charts.

"Ritual Noise" was the album's first single, reaching No. 64 in Germany on 3 February 2006 (charting for 3 weeks) and No. 42 in Sweden on 26 January 2006 (charting for 2 weeks) and "Brave New World" was the second. The song "20 Hz" was featured in the 2005 video game Project Gotham Racing 3.

The band took 14 months to record this album. According to Covenant band member Joakim Montelius, the band went through 150 revisions of "Brave New World", and also numerous revisions of several other songs on Skyshaper.

== Track listing ==
No.	Title	Length
1.	"Ritual Noise"	7:18
2.	"Pulse"	6:04
3.	"Happy Man"	2:46
4.	"Brave New World"	5:24
5.	"The Men"	3:17
6.	"Sweet & Salty"	6:10
7.	"Greater than the Sun"	5:09
8.	"20 Hz"	5:09
9.	"Spindrift"	7:00
10.	"The World Is Growing Loud"	4:57

Limited edition version
No.	Title	Length
11.	"Subterfugue for 3 Absynths"	42:08
12.	"Relief"	4:32
13.	"Ritual Noise" (Calico Remix)	4:51

== Chart positions ==
Skyshaper

Chart (2006)	Peak position
German Albums (Offizielle Top 100)	44
German Alternative Charts (DAC)	1

"Ritual Noise"

Chart (2006)	Peak position
Germany (GfK)	64
Sweden (Sverigetopplistan)	42
