= Mainline E.P. =

EP by Hate Dept.
- Released: October 3, 1995
- Genre: Industrial rock
- Length: 15:06
- Label: Neurotic
- Producer: Steven Seibold

Hate Dept. chronology
meat.your.maker (1994)	Mainline E.P. (1995)	Omnipresent (1996)

Mainline E.P. is an EP by Hate Dept., released on October 3, 1995 by Neurotic Records.

== Reception ==
Sonic Boom noted the more languid tone of Mainline E.P. and said "the lyrics are still bitter throughout most of the tracks, but the music showcases a nice contrast between mellow, emotionally filled tracks and hard-edged aggressive tracks." Aiding & Abetting praised the distinct feel of each track and said "the four songs here keep up the techno-industrial vision promulgated before."

== Track listing ==
All tracks are written by Steven Seibold.

No.	Title	Length
1.	"New Power (Suck Dry)"	3:36
2.	"Omnipresent"	3:34
3.	"Cowgirl"	3:58
4.	"I Don't Know You"	4:00

== Personnel ==
Adapted from the Mainline E.P. liner notes.

Hate Dept.

- Coby Bassett – guitar
- Ryan Daily – drums
- Charles Hunt – drums
- Rob Robinson – keyboards, guitar
- Steven Seibold – lead vocals, programming, production

Additional performers

- Dianna O'Donahue – vocals and arrangements (1)

Production and design

- David Braucher – art direction
- Alberto Lopez – executive-producer
- Bill Walker – executive-producer

== Release history ==
Region	Date	Label	Format	Catalog
United States	1995	Neurotic	CD	NE6901
