= Technical Difficulties (Hate Dept. album) =

Studio album by Hate Dept.
- Released: June 1999
- Studio: Various: Enterprise II; (Burbank, CA); Front Page; (Glendale, CA); Laundry Room; (San Clemente, CA); Westlake Audio; (Hollywood, CA)
- Genre: Industrial rock
- Length: 49:35
- Label: Restless
- Producer: Steven Seibold

Hate Dept. chronology
The Remix Wars: Strike 3 (1997)	Technical Difficulties (1999)	The House That Hate Built (2001)

Technical Difficulties is the third studio album by Hate Dept., released in June 1999 by Restless Records.

== Reception ==
Professional ratings
Review scores
Source	Rating
AllMusic	3/5 stars

Steve Huey of allmusic called Technical Difficulties arguably "their most accessible release to date" and the band "may sound like an industrial band – clanking drum machines, synthesizers, and loud, crusty guitars – but Hate Dept. are alt-rockers at heart, emphasizing traditional song structure and punk lyrical attitude over sonic experimentation and abrasiveness." CMJ said "slamming rock intensity into the looming keyboard progressions of Front 242, while adding jazzy horns and Nine Inch Nails-worthy power ballads, Technical Difficulties is easily the most diverse and robotic weapon in Hate Dept.'s arsenal." The magazine listed Technical Difficulties as one of the magazine's top choices for the month of June.

== Track listing ==
All tracks are written by Steven Seibold.

No.	Title	Length
1.	"Superdrama"	4:18
2.	"Coming Down"	4:31
3.	"Wait"	4:32
4.	"Anger Impulse"	3:56
5.	"Little Let Down"	3:24
6.	"Release It"	3:30
7.	"Gone"	3:59
8.	"Hit Back"	4:23
9.	"Leaving"	5:02
10.	"Fireflies"	4:09
11.	"Seedling"	4:13
12.	"Fiend"	3:37

== Accolades ==
Year	Publication	Country	Accolade	Rank
1999	CMJ New Music Monthly	United States	"CMJ Radio 200"	35
"*" denotes an unordered list.

== Personnel ==
Adapted from the Technical Difficulties liner notes.

Hate Dept.

- Marc Greco – guitar, backing vocals
- Charles Hunt – drums, backing vocals, additional programming (2)
- Steven Seibold – lead vocals, programming, production, mixing
- Jeff Smith – synthesizer, backing vocals

Additional performers

- Joe Chiccarelli – additional production (1, 4)
- Tracey Hooker – trumpet (3)
- Royden Vigilance – additional vocals (3)

Production and design

- Mon Agranat – mixing
- The Gerrixx – cover art, photography
- Bill Kennedy – mixing, additional production (7, 8)
- Dustin Moore – photography
- Jenessa Nye – photography
- Eddy Schreyer – mastering
- Jon St. James – mixing, additional production (3)

== Release history ==
Region	Date	Label	Format	Catalog
United States	1999	Restless	CD	01877-72959-2
