= Slave Unit =

American industrial rock group

- Origin: Oakland, California, United States
- Genres: Industrial rock
- Years active: 1992–present
- Label: COP International
- Past members: Torsten Hartwell; Reyka Osburn; Mike Paikos; Alan Sartirana; Aki Sasaki; Mike Welch
- Website: slaveunit.com

Slave Unit is an American industrial rock group based in Oakland, California, United States. The original incarnation consisted of Torsten Hartwell, Mike Paikos, Alan Sartirana and Mike Welch before becoming Welch's solo endeavor in 1995. Their sound is influenced by hardcore punk, industrial and hip hop music with lyrics pertaining to observations and reflections of human behavior and error. The band released their debut Slave Unit on COP International in 1996.

== History ==
Slave Unit was formed in Oakland, California by Torsten Hartwell, Mike Paikos, Alan Sartirana and Mike Welch. COP International signed the band with the intention of expanding the label's musical diversity and released their eponymously-titled debut album in 1996. The album featured the participation of Battery vocalist Maria Azevedo and Reyka Osburn of Tinfed, who performed on live drums for the tour and recording of the album. After a twelve-year hiatus, the band self-released the album The Battle for Last Place in 2007 and followed it up with the 2009 remix album Certificate of Participation. In 2014 Slave Unit released their fourth album Through With You for WTII Records on April 8 and participated in Stiff Valentine's "Goodbye" tour shortly after.

== Discography ==
Studio albums

- Slave Unit (1996, COP International)
- The Battle for Last Place (2007)
- Certificate of Participation (2009)
- Through With You (2014, WTII)
