= Xorcist =

American musical group

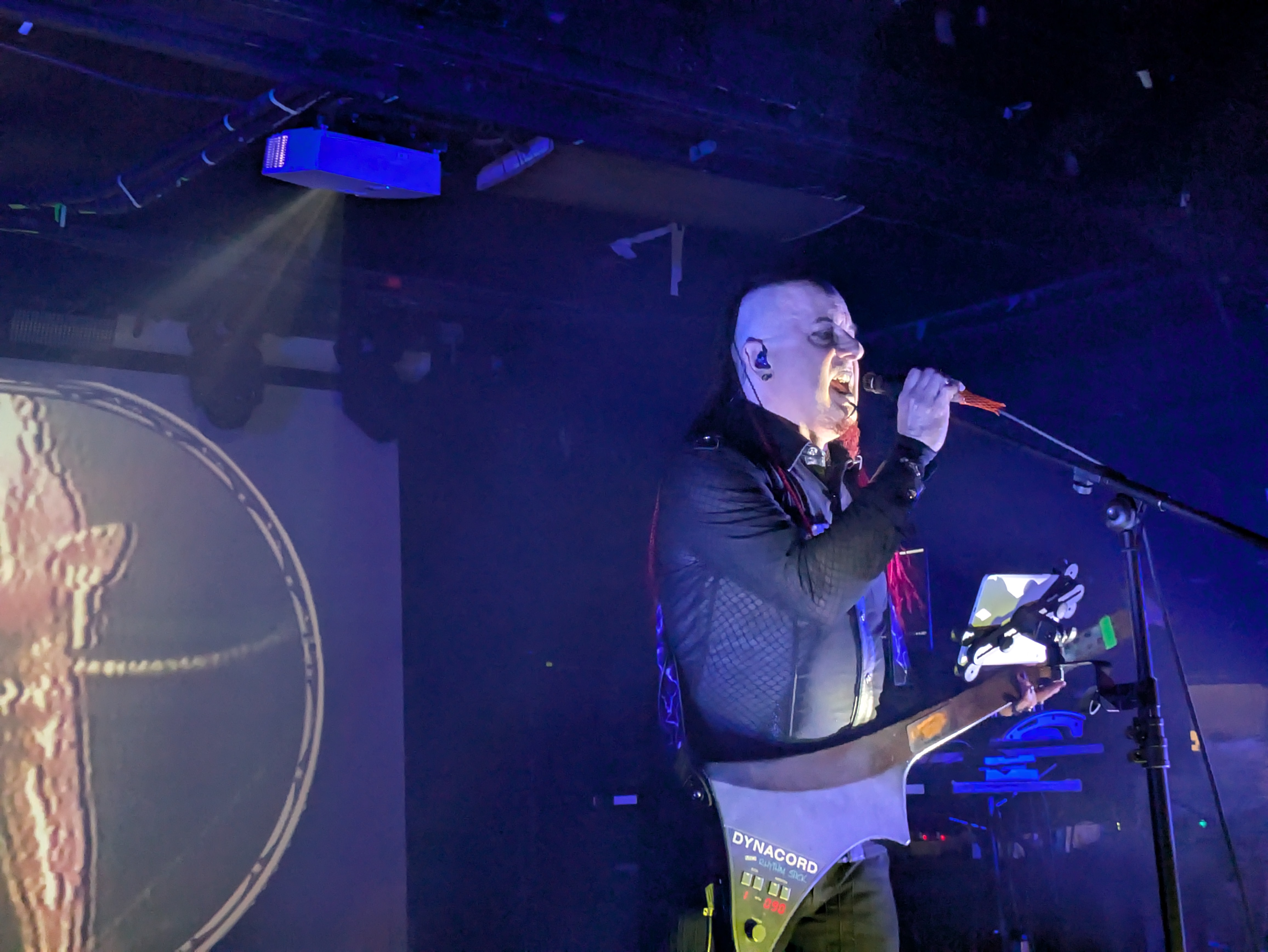
- Peter Stone (aka DJ Bat) performs at El Corazon, Seattle, WA, USA, on 8 May 2025

Background information
- Origin: Los Angeles, California, U.S.
- Genres: Electro-industrial; Ambient music
- Years active: 1990–present
- Labels: Unbelievable Music; 21st Circuitry; GPC Productions; Pendragon; Blackened; Metropolis; CyberDen
- Spinoffs: Diode Fetish, Xenon
- Members: Peter Stone
- Past members: Evoltwin
- Website: xorcist.com

Xorcist is the name of an American musical group whose output has ranged from electro-industrial and ambient.

== Background ==
Peter Stone (a.k.a. DJ/VJ Bat) became interested in electronics and computers at a young age. In his young teens, Stone created and ran BBS software named "Connector" using modified versions of Apple communications software. Stone eventually left high school early to take a job at a software company. As a child he took piano and drum lessons, and later recognized the possibilities in using electronics to create music via artists such as Gary Numan and Yello.

Stone formed Xorcist as a one-man act after leaving his previous band, Belief, circa 1986-7. He stylized the name by dropping the "e" from "exorcist," partially to avoid conflation with a metal band by that name. Stone began by producing and self-releasing demo cassettes, one of which found its way to 21st Circuitry label co-founder, Don Blanchard, leading to a contract with the label. Xorcist's debut album, Damned Souls, was released in 1991; the first release on 21st Circuitry. Having the first release on the label allowed Stone the opportunity to provide assistance to the fledgling company in the guise of business consulting and development of advertising graphics. The album was quickly followed by multiple compilation appearances, including a 1993 cover of Nirvana's "Smells Like Teen Spirit". In 1994, Xorcist released Phantoms, a collection of unreleased tracks dating back to 1987 which peaked at No. 22 on the CMJ RPM charts in the US.

Stone founded the Cyberden in 1991, a BBS focused on underground music and culture. Stone built the Cyberden using FirstClass BBS software to provide a platform for fans of goth and industrial music to connect with independent music labels and exchange files. Stone discontinued the Cyberden by 1996 due to financial issues, but transitioned the community to the web via hallucinet.com. Stone also co-founded Bay area goth-industrial club, House of Usher. The club hosted both live and DJ performances, usually split into two rooms, one for goth and darkwave music, and the other focusing on "cyber" and industrial music.

For the 1993 Lollapalooza tour, Stone produced "The CyberPit," an interactive public area in the festival's "Village" where festival attendees could interact with networked computers to consult an interactive festival directory, post messages to the main stage screen, and online chat with other attendees.

Although a solo act, Stone worked with others for live performances including Xavier Haight of Bay area industrial band, Malign, and producer Don Blanchard. By 1997, Xorcist grew to include Evoltwin. In addition to providing some vocals, Evoltwin created the cover art for Soul Reflection and other subsequent releases.

Stone also created two side projects, Xenon and Diode Fetish.

Xorcist went dormant after 2000, but re-emerged in 2017 with a pair of self-released instrumental compositions, followed in 2018 by the full-length album, God. Later that year, Stone release a remix album, Legion, featuring remixes of Xorcist tracks by Scar Tissue, Prospero, and others.

Stone still DJs and VJs under the name DJ/VJ Bat, and maintains the Xorcist.com website to promote his work.

== Sound design ==
Stone's work in sound design has appeared in MTV's Aeon Flux, and his work creating music and sound design in the video games Iron Helix, Bad Mojo and Space Bunnies Must Die.

== Discography ==
=== Studio albums ===
Title	Details	Notes
From The Hip	Released: 1990; Label: Unbelievable Music; Formats: Cassette	—
Damned Souls	Released: January 1, 1991; Label: 21st Circuitry; Formats: CD album	—
Repossessed/Non-Aggression Pact	Released: 1992; Label: GPC Productions; Formats: Cassette	Limited edition
Phantoms	Released: 1994; Label: 21st Circuitry; Formats: CD album	#22 on CMJ RPM Charts
Soul Reflection	Released: April 29, 1997; Label: 21st Circuitry; Formats: CD album	—
Nomad	Released: March 30, 1999; Label: Pendragon Records; Formats: CD album	—
Insects & Angels: Differences & Indifferences	Released: September 26, 2000; Label: Metropolis; Formats: CD album	#30 on CMJ RPM Charts
Music for the Harmonic Convergence	Released: 2000; Label: MP3.com (no label); Formats: CD-R Enhanced	Peter Stone solo project
Bad Mojo (Disc 1)	Released: May 7, 2017; Label: Self-released (no label); Formats: FLAC	—
Bad Mojo (Disc 2)	Released: May 7, 2017; Label: Self-released (no label); Formats: FLAC	—
Soundtrack Series	Released: May 7, 2017; Label: Self-released (no label); Formats: FLAC	—
God	Released: January 1, 2018; Label: CyberDen; Formats: CD album	Limited edition (300 copies)
Scores	Released: February 25, 2018; Label: Self-released (no label); Formats: FLAC	—
Legion - The Remix Album	Released: 2018; Label: No Devotion Records; Formats: Digital	—
Bad Mojo Soundtrack	Released: July 10, 2019; Label: Ghost Ramp Records; Formats: Vinyl	—
Heaven	Released: Unknown; Label: MP3.com (no label); Formats: CD-R Enhanced	—
Hell	Released: Unknown; Label: MP3.com (no label); Formats: CD-R Enhanced	—
"—" denotes no information worth noting.

=== Compilation appearances ===
Title	Details	Notes
Torture Tech Overdrive	Released: 1991; Label: If It Moves...; Formats: LP	Side B, track no. 3: "So Big"; Limited edition (1000 copies)
Adventures in Music - Cargo Electro Riot Sampler	Released: 1992; Label: Cargo Music; Formats: CD	Track no. 4: "The Dance"
CCCC - California Cyber Crash Compilation	Released: 1992; Label: COP International; Formats: CD	Track no. 4: "Hallucination"
For Crying Out Loud: Edition One	Released: 1992; Label: FCOL Magazine; Formats: Cassette Compilation	Side B, track no. 1: "Hallucination" track no. 2: "Hatelove"
Shut Up Kitty: A Cyber-Based Covers Compilation	Release date: 1993; Label: Re-constriction Records; Formats: CD	Track no. 6: "Smells Like Teen Spirit"
CD Sound Compilation Vol. 1	Released: 1994; Label: IndustrialnatioN Magazine; Formats: CD Compilation	Track no. 9: "Xorcist (Bleeding Mix)"
Cyber Core Compilation	Released: 1994; Label: COP International; Formats: CD	Track no. 14: "U R the 1 (Fux Version)"
The Art of Brutality	Released: 1994; Label: Arts Industria; Formats: CD	Track no. 5: "Be With Me"
The Disease of Lady Madeline	Released: 1994; Label: Anubis Recordings; Formats: CD	Track no. 7: "The Iron Helix"
Torture Tech Overdrive	Released: 1994; Label: Cleopatra; Formats: CD	Track no. 10: "So Big (Original Un-Edited Mix)" Limited Edition Reissue (1000 copies)
21st Circuitry Shox	Released: 1996; Label: 21st Circuitry; Formats: CD	Track no. 2: "Bad Mojo (Sacrosanct Mix)"
The Digital Space Between Vol. 3	Released: 1996; Label: Cleopatra; Formats: CD	Track no. 12: "UNGDSOB (Bastard Mix)"
21st Circuitry Records	Released: 1997; Label: 21st Circuitry; Formats: Cassette	Side B, track no. 5: "Stains"
Digital Wings 1	Released: 1997; Label: The Cyberden; Formats: CD	Track no. 1: "Bad Mojo (Satyria Mix)"
21st Circuitry Shox 2	Released: 1998; Label: 21st Circuitry; Formats: CD	Track no. 6: "Bomblast"
Abby - The Compilation Part 2	Release date: 1998; Label: Höllenfeuer; Formats: 2xCD	Disc 1, track no. 1: "Scorched Blood"
Newer Wave 2.0	Released: 1998; Label: 21st Circuitry; Formats: CD	Track no. 10: "1999"
Resist the Command	Released: 2000; Label: Dystopian Records; Formats: CD	Track no. 3: "GoverNet (Web Edit)"
Electro Radiovengeance	Released: 2003; Label: A.D.S.R. Musicwerks; Formats: CD	Track no. 5: "Bitches"
Sex, Death & Eyeliner: The Soundtrack	Released: 2005; Label: Dark Future Music; Formats: CD	Track no. 1: "Nomad"
"—" denotes no information worth noting.

=== Singles and EPs ===
Title	Details	Notes
Bitches EP	Released: 1993; Label: 21st Circuitry; Formats: Vinyl EP/CD EP	—
Scorched Blood	Release date: 1996; Label: 21st Circuitry; Formats: CD EP	—
"—" denotes no information worth noting.
