= Modern Ruin (Covenant album) =

Studio album by Covenant
- Released: January 2011
- Genre: Futurepop; industrial; synth-pop
- Length: 57:08
- Label: Metropolis

Covenant chronology
Skyshaper (2006)	Modern Ruin (2011)	Leaving Babylon (2013)

Singles from Modern Ruin
- 1. "Lightbringer" Released: 22 October 2010

Professional ratings
Review scores
Source	Rating
COMA Music Magazine	Favourable

Modern Ruin is the seventh studio album by Swedish futurepop band Covenant. It was released on 17 January 2011 by Synthetic Symphony. This was the first album by the band that featured Daniel Myer as a core member.

The second disc features various versions of "Wir Sind Die Nacht", a song the band recorded for the film of the same name.

== Track listing ==
No.	Title	Writer(s)	Length
1.	"Modern Ruin"	Joakim Montelius, Mattias Möller	1:28
2.	"Lightbringer (feat. Necro Facility)"	Henrik Bäckström, Oscar Holter, Eskil Simonsson	5:41
3.	"Judge of my Domain"	Montelius, Simonsson	6:05
4.	"Dynamo Clock"	Montelius, Daniel Myer	5:32
5.	"Kairos"	Simonsson	1:11
6.	"The Beauty and the Grace"	Myer	4:52
7.	"Get On"	Simonsson	4:40
8.	"Worlds Collide"	Myer	4:16
9.	"The Night"	Simonsson	3:20
10.	"Beat the Noise"	Simonsson	6:00
11.	"The Road"	Montelius, Myer, Simonsson	4:53
12.	"Modern Ruin II" (Hidden Track)	Montelius	9:10

All tracks are written by Holter, Simonsson.

Wir sind die Nacht (Bonus CD)
No.	Title	Length
1.	"Wir sind die Nacht (Soundtrack)"	3:45
2.	"Wir sind die Nacht (Oscar Holter Remix)"	5:06
3.	"Wir sind die Nacht (Full Instrumental)"	8:24
4.	"Wir sind die Nacht (Henrik Bäckström Remix)"	5:09
5.	"Wir sind die Nacht (Sample)"	0:11
6.	"Ich war nichts (Sample)"	0:52
7.	"Wunder (Sample)"	0:04
Total length:		23:31

== Personnel ==
=== Covenant ===
- Joakim Montelius – production (1, 3, 11, 12)
- Daniel Myer – production (4, 6, 8, 11)
- Eskil Simonsson – vocals, production (2, 3, 5, 7, 9–11, "Wir sind die Nacht")

=== Additional musicians ===
- Henrik Bäckström – vocals (2)
- Andreas Radler – machinedrum (10)

=== Technical personnel ===
- Oscar Holter – preproduction (2), production ("Wir sind die Nacht"), mastering ("Wir sind die Nacht")
- Mattias Möller – production (1), RSF Kobol expander (1)
- Björn Engelmann – mastering
- Ben Wolf – band photos
- Stefan Alt – other photographs
- Dirk Rudolph – logo, font
- Tobias Green – artwork, design

== Charts ==
Chart (2011)	Peak position
German Albums (Offizielle Top 100)	44
Swedish Albums (Sverigetopplistan)	31
