= Omnipresent (Hate Dept. album) =

Studio album by Hate Dept.
- Released: February 20, 1996
- Genre: Industrial rock
- Length: 42:23
- Label: Neurotic
- Producer: Steven Seibold

Hate Dept. chronology
Mainline E.P. (1995)	Omnipresent (1996)	The Remix Wars: Strike 3 (1997)

Omnipresent is the second studio album by Hate Dept., released on February 20, 1996 by Neurotic Records.

== Reception ==
Professional ratings
Review scores
Source	Rating
AllMusic	3/5 stars

Aiding & Abetting said "perhaps the band's most important attribute is its ability to combine the catchy with the intense without creating wanky anthems" praised them for being "capable of shifting moods as well as anyone in the game." Sonic Boom lauded the band for continuing in the style of Mainline E.P. while saying "there are still plenty of tracks that deliver their classic sounds of anger and spite and still tremendous amounts of energy in their songs." CMJ listed Omnipresent as one of the magazine's top choices for the month of May.

== Track listing ==
All tracks are written by Steven Seibold.

No.	Title	Length
1.	"The Dead Peddler"	4:21
2.	"Bitch"	3:11
3.	"New Power"	3:35
4.	"Won't Stay Lit"	3:36
5.	"Jump Steven, Jump!"	1:17
6.	"This Doggy Bites"	4:11
7.	"Rejoice"	4:27
8.	"Best Things"	4:41
9.	"I Don't Know You"	4:00
10.	"Dreams of Conspiracy"	1:27
11.	"Thinker"	3:14
12.	"Flesh Feeds Soul"	4:15

== Accolades ==
Year	Publication	Country	Accolade	Rank
1996	CMJ New Music Monthly	United States	"May Top 75"	*
"*" denotes an unordered list.

== Personnel ==
Adapted from the Omnipresent liner notes.

Hate Dept.

- Coby Bassett – guitar, backing vocals
- Ryan Daily – synthesizer, drums, backing vocals
- Charles Hunt – drums, backing vocals
- Steven Seibold – lead vocals, programming, production

Additional performers

- Dianna O'Donahue – vocals and arrangements
- Shawn Sutherland – percussion, backing vocals

Production and design

- David Braucher – art direction
- Alberto Lopez – executive-producer
- Jenessa Nye – photography
- Rob Robinson – cover art
- Bill Walker – executive-producer

== Release history ==
Region	Date	Label	Format	Catalog
United States	1996	Neurotic	CD	NE6902
