= Jezebel Thirteen Three =

Studio album by LUXT
- Released: March 1996
- Studio: Chalkhead Digital (Yuba City, CA)
- Genre: Industrial metal
- Length: 56:37
- Label: Chalkhead
- Producer: Anna Christine; Erie Loch

LUXT chronology
Jezebel Thirteen Three (1996)	Disrepair (1997)

Jezebel Thirteen Three is the debut studio album of LUXT, released in March 1996 by Chalkhead Records.

== Reception ==
In his review for Jezebel Thirteen Three, Larry Miles of Black Monday praised LUXT's penchant for melodic industrial and called the music "magnificent in its purity and simplicity." Last Sigh Magazine was enthusiastic about the band's high production quality and "hard hitting aggressive sound." Sonic Boom praised Anna Christine's vocal performances and noted that the band could achieve success on a more prominent label.

== Track listing ==
All lyrics are written by Erie Loch; all music is composed by Anna Christine and Erie Loch.

No.	Title	Length
1.	"Innocence Lost"	4:14
2.	"United State"	4:54
3.	"Pain"	6:04
4.	"Subcutaneous Grin"	4:39
5.	"Lemmings"	3:34
6.	"Hardware"	5:03
7.	"Technochrist"	3:28
8.	"Hunger"	4:32
9.	"Filament"	1:45
10.	"Desire"	4:17
11.	"Burn"	7:20
12.	"Untitled"	6:47

== Personnel ==
Adapted from the Jezebel Thirteen Three liner notes.

LUXT

- Anna Christine – bass guitar, keyboards, sampler, vocals, production, recording, engineering
- Erie Loch – guitar, keyboards, sampler, vocals, production, recording, engineering

Production and design

- Richard Muncaster – cover art

== Release history ==
Region	Date	Label	Format	Catalog
United States	1996	Chalkhead	CD	CLK 133
