= LUXT =

American industrial metal band

- Origin: Sacramento, California, U.S.
- Genre: Industrial metal
- Years active: 1995–2005, 2025–present
- Labels: 21st Circuitry, Blackliner, Chalkhead
- Past members: Anna Christine; Crash; David Hiscook; Dave Hubbard; Erie Loch; Phil Mohr; Frost Reed

LUXT is an American industrial metal band formed in Sacramento, California by multi-instrumentalists Anna Christine and Erie Loch, with Loch composing the lyrics.

== History ==
LUXT was formed out of Sacramento, California in 1995 by multi-instrumentalists Anna Christine and Erie Loch. Their 1996 debut album was titled Jezebel Thirteen Three and released by the band's label Chalkhead Records. In 1997 the band was signed to 21st Circuitry and released their second album Disrepair in March. LUXT's third album Razing Eden followed a year later and was released by 21st Circuitry. It was viewed as a marked improvement over their previous work because of its higher production value and greater focus on hooks and melodies. In 2000 the band self-released another album for Chalkhead Records titled Chromasex Monkeydrive.

The band's fifth album American Beast was released in 2003 by Blackliner Records. In February of that year the album peaked on three CMJ's charts: "Loud Rock: College" at number nineteen, "Loud Rock: Crucial Spins" at number thirty-two and "CMJ Retail 100" at number ninety-one. After ten years together LUXT disbanded on April 15, 2005.

After a twenty year hiatus, Luxt reformed and began playing shows. Their first show after reuniting was at the Goldfield trading post in Roseville on November 22, 2025.

== Discography ==
Studio albums

- Jezebel Thirteen Three (1996, Chalkhead)
- Disrepair (1997, 21st Circuitry)
- Razing Eden (1998, 21st Circuitry)
- Chromasex Monkeydrive (2000, Chalkhead)
- American Beast (2003, Blackliner)
