= Scar Tissue (band) =

American electro-industrial group formed in California, United States

- Origin: Oakland, California, United States
- Genres: Electro-industrial
- Years active: 1990–present
- Label: 21st Circuitry
- Members: Philip Caldwell; Steve Watkins
- Past members: Masayuki Ishikawa; Seann Vowell

Scar Tissue were an American electro-industrial group formed in Oakland, California, United States with Philip Caldwell and Steve Watkins forming the band's creative nucleus. They released three albums for 21st Circuitry: Separator (1996), TMOTD (1997) and Rebuild (1998). After a ten-year hiatus, Scar Tissue reunited in 2008 to release the dark electronic album Potential, which they followed up on two years later with 2010's Obscurity.

== History ==
Scar Tissue was formed in 1990 by multi-instrumentalist Steve Watkins and vocalist Sean "Dofino" Vowell. Vowell soon departed from the band after a series of misfortunes left him homeless for awhile. Watkins was joined by guitarist Philip Caldwell and the pair released a demo in 1995 that experimented mixing ambient dub, dance electronics and guitars. Scar Tissue signed to 21st Circuitry in 1996. Label president Don Blanchard had been sent the tape around four years previously but it is uncertain if he listened to it. The band released their 1996 debut album Separator, which charted at twentieth on CMJ's Dance Top 25.

A year later they followed with their second album TMOTD which continued to draw from the recording sessions that produced their previous album. The album increased the band's use of vocal samples and keyboard rhythms and received praise for its dynamic use of subtlety. Tom Schulte of Allmusic called the band "among the most elaborate and schizophrenic representatives of the darkwave genre."

Scar Tissue was joined by turntablist Tao Gurnoe for their third and final album for 21st Circuitry Rebuild, released in 1998. It comprises ten remixes made from songs appearing on previous albums and six previously unreleased tracks. The duo of Philip Caldwell and Steve Watkins started Form/Alkaline to produce other music. The self-released albums Potential and Obscurity were released in 2008 and 2010 respectively and appeared on Scar Tissue's Bandcamp.

== Discography ==
Studio albums

- Separator (1996, 21st Circuitry)
- TMOTD (1997, 21st Circuitry)
- Rebuild (1998, 21st Circuitry)
- Form/Alkaline (2008)
- Potential (2008)
- Obscurity (2010)
