= Hate Dept. =

American industrial/punk rock band

- Genres: Industrial rock, punk rock
- Years active: 1991–present
- Labels: 21st Circuitry; Neurotic; Restless; Underground; Offbeat; Artoffact; Mars Colony
- Members: Steven Seibold (1991–present); Ivan Kazak
- Past members: Steven Ortiz; Mark Greco; Charles Hunt; Rob Robinson; Jamie Leighton; Coby Basset; Ryan Daily; Shawn Sutherland; James Pratt; Scott "Phrog" Elgram; Craig Longiotti; Diana O'Donahue; Paul Neiser; Jeff Smith; Trey Miller; Chad Danley; Garret Craig; Jason Gildner; James Agnew; Nick Meade; Jae Stevens; Dean Love; Q Matthew Z Belcher
- Website: hatedept.com

Hate Dept. is an American industrial/punk rock band, formed in 1991 by Steven Seibold. Seibold is a multi-instrumentalist who writes, records and releases Hate Dept. albums with minimal outside help. He formed Hate Dept. in 1991 in reaction to fickle 'electro' audiences and antipathy towards live electronic bands, taking his sound in a more punk direction.

== Early years and Initial releases: 1991-1996 ==
Hate Dept.'s debut album in 1994, Meat.Your.Maker, appeared in Rolling Stone's Top 10 alternative albums, while Seibold was nominated 'Best New Talent' by Keyboard magazine. Omnipresent, the second release by the group, was reviewed in Rolling Stone and Alternative Press and spent eight weeks on the CMJ RPM chart, peaking at #7.

== Moderate success and subsequent releases: 1996-2013 ==
Hate Dept. had a brief period of commercial success after the release of the third album Technical Difficulties. The only single, Release It, earned radio airplay in 50 North American markets. The song peaked at number 40 on Billboard's Dance chart. The release also peaked at #49 on the CMJ Radio Top 200 and #7 on the CMJ RPM Charts.

Seibold joined Pigface in 2001, touring and recording with Martin Atkins in several projects. During this time, Hate Dept. released their fourth album Ditch in 2003. Although the band had publicly announced the release of the fifth studio album, A New Ghost. production stalled and for years, fans were left with little more than rumors of random, unavailable songs.

In August 2013, 10 years after the release of Ditch, the album New Ghost, was released.

== Later years to present: 2013-present ==
In 2014 Seibold released a trilogy of albums available for remixing by fans on Bandcamp.

== Discography ==
Studio albums

- meat.your.maker (1994, 21st Circuitry)
- Omnipresent (1996, Neurotic)
- Technical Difficulties (1998, Restless)
- DITCH (2003, Underground, Inc.)
- New Ghost (2013, Awful Noise)

EPs

- Mainline E.P. (1995, Neurotic)
- The Remix Wars: Strike 3 – 16 Volt vs. Hate Dept (1996, 21st Circuitry)
