= 21st Circuitry =

American record label

- Founded: 1991
- Defunct: 1999
- Genre: Industrial rock
- Country of origin: U.S.
- Location: San Francisco, California

21st Circuitry was a record label based in San Francisco, California, that was founded in early 1991. The label released music from genres, such as electro-industrial, industrial rock, and other similar styles of music. The label signed a number of artists, including, Covenant, Unit:187, and Xorcist, as well as releasing a number of compilation albums targeted at the industrial scene. Some releases were distributed via other labels, including Caroline Records and Metropolis Records. In 1999, 21st Circuitry shut its doors and its remaining stock was purchased by Metropolis Records.

== Notable artists ==
- Covenant
- Hate Dept.
- Luxt
- Mute Angst Envy
- New Mind
- Scar Tissue
- Templebeat

== Compilations ==
- Death Rave 2000 (1993)
- Death Rave 2010 (1994)
- Coldwave Breaks (1995)
- 21st Circuitry Shox (1996)
- The Remix Wars: Strike 1 - :Wumpscut: Vs. Haujobb
- The Remix Wars: Strike 3 - 16 Volt Vs. Hate Dept.
- Newer Wave (1997)
- Coldwave Breaks II (1997)
- Newer Wave 2.0 (1998)
- 21st Circuitry Shox 2 (1998)

== See also ==
- List of record labels
- Metropolis Records
