= Infest (festival) =

Alternative electronic music festival in Manchester, England

Infest Festival
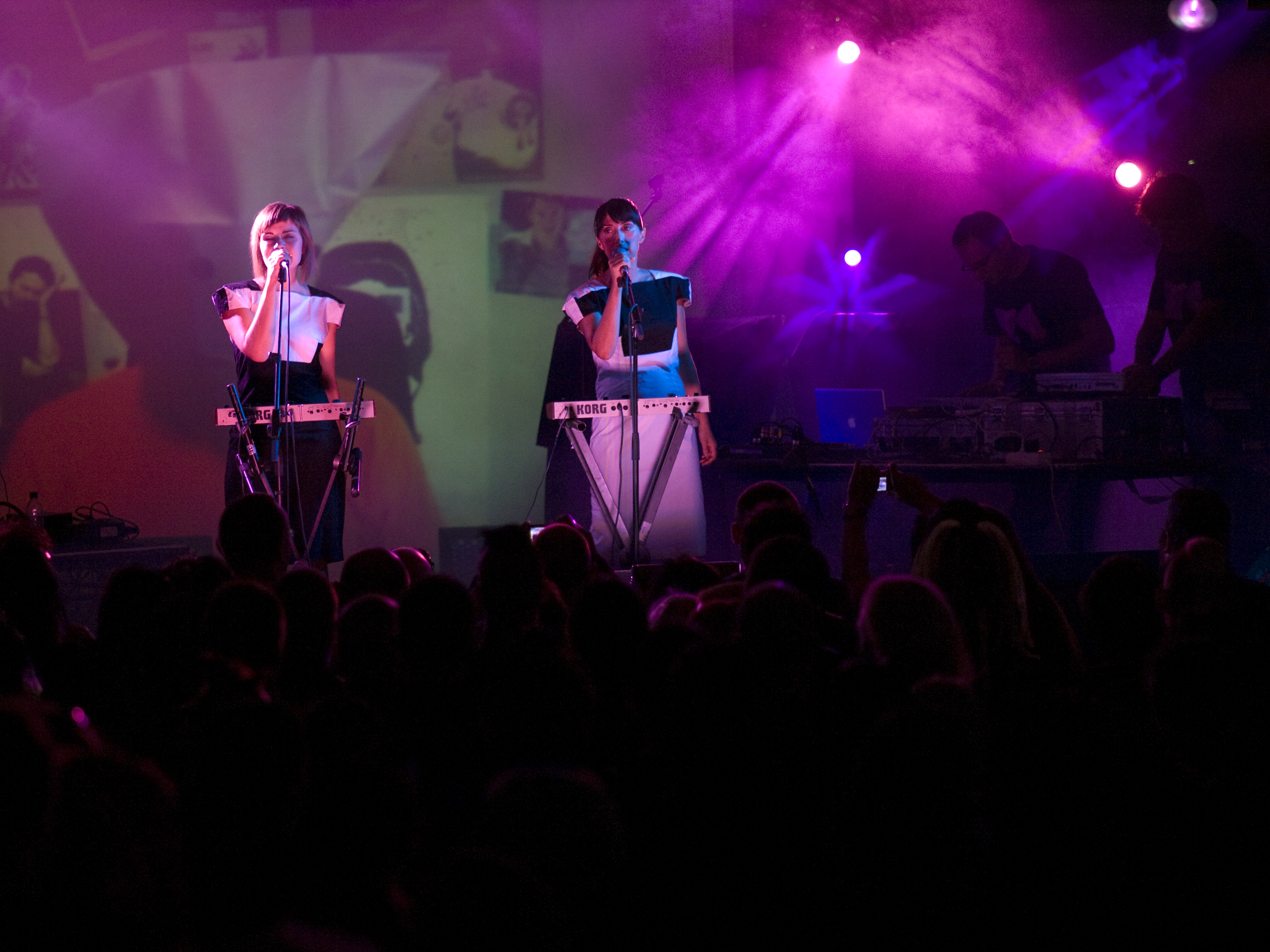
- Greek synthpop duo Marsheaux at Infest 2008
- Genre: Industrial music, Electronic body music, Synth-pop, Futurepop, Rhythmic noise, Gothic rock, Death rock, Dark wave and related genres
- Dates: Annually in August, usually Summer Bank Holiday weekend
- Locations: Manchester, England
- Years active: 1998 to today
- Founders: "Black Lobster Promotions"
- Website: http://infestuk.com/

Infest (originally stylised as InFest) is an annual three-day music festival held at the Manchester Academy in the United Kingdom, featuring alternative electronic music acts, from genres including industrial, EBM, futurepop, synth-pop and power noise. The event usually takes place on the August bank holiday weekend.

== History ==
=== Background ===
InFest was born in early 1998 through the efforts of three students of the University of Bradford – Gareth 'Gadge' Harvey, Chris 'Crusty' Molyneux, and Max 'Maxi Slag' – and the Students' Union Entertainments Manager, Floyd Peltier. The concept of the festival was originally envisioned as a one-day event for local goth bands in West Yorkshire, but the crew were able to also onboard much bigger acts, such as gothic/death rock band Alien Sex Fiend. The student organisers were already fans of the Whitby Gothic Weekend and took the idea for Infest to the Whitby festival-goers and traders to gauge how popular the show might be. The response was positive and the first Infest festival was confirmed as 14 and 15 August 1998.

The following year (1999), the festival paid more attention towards the electronic side of the goth and industrial scene by booking Apoptygma Berzerk for their first UK show.

=== Reinvention ===
By 2000, the University of Bradford's Students' Union felt that they could not carry the costs of the festival any longer. However, an independent goth/industrial promoter and DJ named Mark 'Gus' Guy (former drummer with the indie band Kerosene), who had been advising Molyneux during the show's early years, stepped in to fill the void. As a result of the heavy involvement with Guy and his Terminal Productions company, Infest took the form it is recognised as today: the festival's theme has moved from goth/industrial crossover to alternative electronic, with a greater emphasis on power noise, futurepop, synth-pop and electronic body music. However, occasionally more Dark wave-style goth bands do still appear on the line-up.

The stylisation of the name had changed in 2003 to be "Infest", and from this time has grown significant international recognition. The show continues to provide a market for traders, which helps to bring the music and the lifestyle of the show's fans together. There is also a full festival program where nightclubs, DJs, bands and businesses can make their voices heard. Infest has been supported by a number of electronic record labels, notably Ant-Zen, Hands Productions, and now-defunct online music stores Music Non Stop and Storming the Base (the latter part of the record label Artoffact Records). Support outside the scene has also come from music software publisher Ableton, and drink manufacturers Jägermeister and Barr.

In July 2013, the festival organisers announced that "it is highly unlikely that there will be an Infest in 2014"; but following "an avalanche of messages of support" the organisers have decided to "throw caution to the wind and go ahead with Infest in 2014 (The reason for announcing that infest 2014 was highly unlikely was due to AltFest being proposed to occur a couple of weeks before Infest in 2014. In the end Altfest was canceled due to lack of ticket sales and financial insecurity for the viability of a new big festival that had no history on the alternative music scene)." The festival celebrated their 20th anniversary in 2018, adding an extra day that year for the occasion. In 2019 the Thursday night warm-up being passed to Flag Promotions and Cryonica Recordings, and relocated to a dive bar venue in town. This allowed Terminal Productions to focus on the main event

In 2020 and 2021 Infest moved to a Twitch Livestream due to the COVID 19 Pandemic and rebranded as "Stay-in-Fest".

In 2022 it moved back to being an in person festival, playing Bradford University for the last time before they ceased to host external promotions in late 2022.

In 2023 and 2024 the festival found a temporary host in St George’s Hall in Bradford which allowed the organizers to experiment with elaborate stage designs and visual effects.

In 2025 the festival relocated again to Manchester Academy.

=== Today ===
Today, Guy has a small team of people at his side, including Molyneux (the remaining member of the founding team), graphic designer Richard King, Ticket Office Manager Lee Thornton and a crew of volunteers and live production professionals.

== Performers ==
=== 1998 ===
- Alien Sex Fiend, Dust to Dust, Horatii, Leechwoman, man(i)kin, Nekromantik, Passion Play, Rosetta Stone (cancelled), Sneaky Bat Machine, Squid, Ultraviolence

=== 1999 ===
- Friday: The DJ Wars: The Bratcave DJs Vs Deathstar Disco
- Saturday: Apoptygma Berzerk, Faithful Dawn, Killing Miranda, Sneaky Bat Machine, man(i)kin
- Sunday: Spahn Ranch, Inertia, Narcissus Pool

=== 2000 ===
- Friday: Ultraviolence, Synapscape
- Saturday: VNV Nation, Manuskript, MS Gentur, Intra Venus, Project X, Void Construct
- Sunday: In Strict Confidence, Dream Disciples, Imminent, man(i)kin, Libitina

=== 2001 ===
- Friday: Inertia, The Nine, Swarf,
- Saturday: Suicide Commando, Beborn Beton, P.A.L, Leechwoman, Katscan, Illumina,
- Sunday: Covenant, Dive, Icon of Coil, Monolith, Goteki

=== 2002 ===
- Friday: XPQ-21, Psyche, Revolution by Night
- Saturday: Funker Vogt, Sonar, S.P.O.C.K (replacing Neuroticfish), Winterkälte, Greenhaus, Synthetic
- Sunday: Mesh, Noisex, Welle: Erdball, Asche, Aslan Faction

=== 2003 ===
- Friday: cut.rate.box, scrap.edx, Tarantella Serpentine
- Saturday: God Module, Needle Sharing, Seabound, Tarmvred, Culture Kultür, Je$us Loves Amerika, SINA (cancelled)
- Sunday: VNV Nation, Hypnoskull, [:SITD:], Resurrection Eve, Arkam Asylum

=== 2004 ===
- Friday: Lights of Euphoria, Ah Cama-Sotz, Action Directe
- Saturday: Suicide Commando, Proyecto Mirage, Plastic, Combichrist, Angel Theory, Skinflick
- Sunday: Assemblage 23, Converter, Spetsnaz, Mono No Aware (replacing Sara Noxx), Silence Is Sexy

=== 2005 ===
- Friday: Fixmer/McCarthy, Powderpussy, Univaque
- Saturday: Covenant, Punch Inc, Decoded Feedback, HIV+, The Azoic, Tin Omen
- Sunday: Blutengel, KiEw, Iris, Final Selection, Deviant UK

=== 2006 ===
- Friday Lab 4, Destroid, Schmoof
- Saturday Rotersand, Architect, Unter Null, Reaper, S.K.E.T., O.V.N.I

=== 2007 ===
- Friday Portion Control, Greyhound, The Gothsicles.
- Saturday Apoptygma Berzerk, 13th Monkey, Dope Stars Inc., Caustic, Faderhead, Synnack.
- Sunday VNV Nation, Soman, Painbastard, Rupesh Cartel, E.S.A.

=== 2008 ===
- Friday Grendel, Snog, Coreline.
- Saturday And One, 5F-X, Heimataerde, Santa Hates You, 100blumen, Skinjob.
- Sunday Front 242, Noisuf-X, Tyske Ludder, Marsheaux, Deviant UK.

=== 2009 ===
- none

=== 2010 ===
- Friday De/Vision, Heimstatt Yipotash, Mandro1d.
- Saturday Rotersand, x-Rx, Agonoize, Memmaker, Northern Kind
- Sunday Project Pitchfork, Nachtmahr, Ayria, Patenbrigade: Wolff, Concrete Lung, Parralox (postponed from Saturday).

=== 2011 ===
- Friday Uturns, Code 64, Tactical Sekt.
- Saturday V2A, Maschinenkrieger 52 vs Disraptor, Alien Vampires, Absolute Body Control, Xotox, Hocico
- Sunday Sci-Fi Mafia (added during the weekend), Analog Angel, Julien K (cancelled), Shiv-R, mind.in.a.box, Sonar, VNV Nation

=== 2012 ===
- Friday Spacebuoy, Dirty K, Necro Facility, Klinik
- Saturday System:FX, Suono, A Split-Second, XP8, Geistform, Solitary Experiments, DJ Kohl
- Sunday Resist, Tenek, Blitzmaschine, Absurd Minds, Winterkälte, Suicide Commando

=== 2013 ===
- Friday Metal Tech, Inertia, Dive, Pride & Fall
- Saturday AAAK, Wieloryb, Click Click, Da Octopusss, Chrysalide, Imperative Reaction, DJ Kohl
- Sunday Autoclav1.1, Future Trail, XMH, Sono, Cervello Elettronico, Covenant

=== 2014 ===
- Friday Dreams Divide, Cyanotic, Acucrack, Haujobb
- Saturday The Ladder, Be My Enemy, Xenturion Prime, Architect (replacing Ambassador21), Legend, Juno Reactor
- Sunday Syd.31, Mr.Kitty, ESA (replacing Le Moderniste), Solar Fake, Ashbury Heights, VNV Nation (replacing Project Pitchfork)

=== 2015 ===
- Friday Ctrl Alt Del, D-K-A-G, Cocksure, Empirion
- Saturday Alterred, Ethan Fawkes, Chant, L'Âme Immortelle, Klangstabil, mind.in.a.box
- Sunday Mechanical Cabaret, reADJUST, Bhambhamhara, Syrian (replacing Melotron), Monolith, Project Pitchfork

=== 2016 ===
- Friday Pop Will Eat Itself, Dead When I Found Her, Me The Tiger, Massive Ego
- Saturday Atari Teenage Riot, Velvet Acid Christ, Grausame Töchter, Hysteresis, Monica Jeffries, Tapewyrm
- Sunday 3Teeth, Leaether Strip, Displacer, Rroyce, Vigilante, Johnny Normal

=== 2017 ===
- Friday Rotersand, Noyce, Accessory, They Called Him Zone
- Saturday Die Krupps, End.User, Wulfband, Empathy Test, Chemical Sweet Kid, Riotmiloo
- Sunday Revolting Cocks, iVardensphere, The Juggernauts, Vampyre Anvil, Sidewalks and Skeletons, Among the Echoes

=== 2018 ===
An extra day (Thursday) was added to celebrate the 20th anniversary of the event.

- Thursday Peter Hook and the Light, Empirion, Zeitgeist Zero, Grave Diggers Union
- Friday Cubanate, Iszoloscope, Siva Six, Def Neon
- Saturday Mesh, Sarin, Liebknecht, Actors, Yura Yura, Adam is a girl, Flesh Eating Foundation
- Sunday Aesthetic Perfection, This Morn Omina, Strvngers, Elegant Machinery, Valhall, Massenhysterie, Promenade Cinema

=== 2019 ===
- Thursday Warm Up Party featuring Das Ich, Inertia, Black Light Ascension, Drakenwerks, Matt Hart.
- Friday Light Asylum, Sulpher, Torul, Bitman
- Saturday Zardonic, She Wants Revenge, Dive, Rave the Reqviem, Cacophoneuses, Landscape Body Machine, Witch of the Vale.
- Sunday Ancient Methods, Nitzer Ebb, Kaelan Mikla, OHMelectronic, Future Lied to Us, Noire Antidote, Ded.Pxl, Karkasaurus

=== 2020 ===
Due to Covid-19 the show was moved online and called Stay-In-Fest.

Three online stages were hosted by Lee Chaos, Duracell Bunny, Kark & Peewee ([Karkasaurus), and Matt Biomechanimal.

=== 2021 ===
A small crowd of around 80 people were invited to a social distanced show held live in Bradford. This was again streamed out as Stay-In-Fest 2021.

Friday had a small warmup party featuring Biomechanimal (DJ set), Karkasaurus and Chaos Emergency Doof Broadcast.

- Saturday live at the venue Red Meat, Bone Cult, Tapewrym, Portion Control, Tapewrym, Biomechanimal, DSTR, NOISOME

=== 2022 ===
Suicide Commando, The Cassandra Complex, ADAM X, REIN (planned), Wynardtage vs Hydroxie, Caustic, Moaan Exis, MAEDON, Monya, KLACK, Attrition, Glass Apple Bonzai, Beautiful Machines, Grabyourface, Reichsfeind, Knight$, Vaein, Berlyn Trilogy

=== 2023 ===
Test Dept, Xotox, Choke Chain, Je T'Aime, Goteki, Capital X, Ventenner (planned), Intsec, Red Meat, Parade Ground, Porno Karaoke, Normoria, La Rissa, Nightmare Frequency, Zynic, Beborn Beton, Zardonic, Geneviéve Pasqier, Dj Bacana Ireland/BR.

=== 2024 ===
Republica, ICD-10, Matt Hart, Agency-V, Rein, Kollaps, Ductape, Divine Shade, Llumen, The Royal Ritual, Memepunks, Hatari, Xotox, Plack Blague, Emmon, Dancing Plague, Mark Hex, Corlyx.

=== 2025 ===
Eisfabrik, Harpy, Auger, William Bleak, Junkie Kut, Petrol Bastard, The Royal Ritual, Project Pitchfork, Blackbook, Lizette Lizette, Sans-Fin, Piston Damp, Heartlay, Winkie, The DSM IV, Muta-scuM.

=== 2026 ===
FIS TING, Owls, Wavepeak, Ghostbells, Lovelorn Dolls, Louisahhh, Bein-E, The Dirt, The Gospel, Human Steel, NNHMN, Aux Animaux, Utah Saints, Tr4nsients, Pretty Addicted, Holy Braille, Sylvgeist Maelstrom, Potochkine, Agnis, IAMX.

== Charity ==
The festival raises donations for several charities.

=== Past Donations ===
2025: £7,696.80 shared between Sophie Lancaster Foundation and Samaritans Festival Branch

2024: £6,320.00 shared evenly between Candlelighters and Motor Neurone Disease Association

2023: £5,580.25 split between Bradford Samaritans and the MS Society in memory of Steph from UBU Bars

2022: £6,390.00 split between Bradford Samaritans, Candlelighters and UNHCR Ukraine Fund.

2021: £8,249.55 split between CALM, RNLI and PPWH.

2020: £8,805.00 split between Beat:Cancer, Cure DM CIC and MIND.

2019: £7,787.88 split between Cancer Support Yorkshire, MIND and Guide Dogs.

2018: £7,460.00 split between Guide Dogs, Bradford Samaritans, Yorkshire Cancer Research

2017: £9,400.00 split between Macmillan, Guide Dogs and MIND in memory of Tails

2016: £4,446.00 split between Congenital Myotonic Fight Fund, Lymphoma Association and Guide Dogs

2015: £3,403.90 split between Help for Heroes, Guide Dogs and Marie Curie Cancer Care

2014: £3,444.00 split between Help for Heroes, Guide Dogs and Marie Curie Cancer Care

2013: £2,460.00 split between Help for Heroes, Guide Dogs and Marie Curie Cancer Care

2012: £2,206.00 split between Help for Heroes, Guide Dogs and Marie Curie Cancer Care in memory of Paul

2011: £2,900.00 split between Marie Curie Cancer Care and Guide Dogs

2010: just over £2000

2009: Infest called off

2008: No total announced

2007: No total announced split between Lymphoma Association and Marie Curie Cancer Care

2006: £1,200.00 split between Lymphoma Association and Marie Curie Cancer Care

2005: No total announced for Marie Curie Cancer Care

2004: No total announced

== See also ==
- List of electronic music festivals
- List of gothic festivals
- List of industrial music festivals
