= Bruderschaft =

Electronic music collective

- Origin: United States
- Genres: Synth-pop; futurepop; EBM
- Years active: 1999–present
- Labels: RazorBurn; Alfa Matrix
- Members: Rexx Arkana; Ronan Harris; Joakim Montelius; Sebastian Komor; Stephan Groth; Johann Sebastian; Tom Shear; Andylab; Dräcos; Daniel Graves; Jared Lambert; Maze; Stefan Netschio; P-O Svensson; Daniel Myer

Bruderschaft is an electronic music collective led by New York City-based DJ Rexx Arkana (died 03 July 2026 https://www.side-line.com/rexx-arkana-fgfc820-bruderschaft-dies/). Conceived as a charity project focused on cancer research and treatment in the wake of Arkana's father's death from the disease, Bruderschaft brought together a large number of artists from the underground electronic music scene for the production of the band's first single, "Forever": the collaboration of Arkana (lyrics), Ronan Harris (VNV Nation - vocals), Sebastian Komor (Icon of Coil - programming/production), Joakim Montelius (Covenant - samples/loops) and Stephan Groth (Apoptygma Berzerk - backing vocals).

After the death of his father in 1999, Rexx Arkana shared with Ronan Harris and Joakim Montelius the lyrics he wrote for "Forever" and they were willing to help turn it into a proper song. In 2001, Arkana discussed the project with Sebastian Komor, who produced the basic track that later became "Forever" using loops that Montelius had made. In 2002, Harris was still willing to perform the lead vocals on the song and Stephan Groth was willing to perform backing vocals after hearing a rough version of the song.

Released by RazorBurn Records, in European partnership with Alfa-Matrix in 2003, the "Forever" EP (also available in a 2-Disc Limited Edition) featured a large list of remixers, including Front 242, Camouflage, Feindflug, Melotron, The Retrosic, Negative Format, Angels & Agony, Colony 5, Lights of Euphoria, DavaNtage, Grendel, Punto Omega, [:SITD:]. "Forever" peaked at #1 on the DAC Singles charts and was ranked #7 on the DAC Top Singles of 2003.

In keeping with the founding concept behind the project, all net profits from the global sales of the CD were augmented by the proceeds of local release parties in cities around the world, raising nearly $50,000 for charity.

In 2005, Bruderschaft was working on "Return", the band's second release. On the title track, the second incarnation of the group was to feature the programming talents of returning contributor Sebastian Komor, newcomer Johann Sebastian (State of the Union - composer); new vocalist Tom Shear (Assemblage 23); and lyricist Rexx Arkana (FGFC820).

A second new original from the band, "Trigger," features music written by Arkana and "Forever" remixer/FGFC820 member Dräcos and System Syn founder/vocalist Clint Carney. On January 21, 2009, it was revealed that the song would be released as part of an EP.

The band performed at the 2011 Kinetik Festival playing unreleased material with Tom Shear, Clint Carney, and Aesthetic Perfection founder/vocalist Daniel Graves.

In 2013, Bruderschaft returned with the single "Falling," featuring Daniel Myer of Haujobb on vocals. The collective announced that their EP Return would be released through the Alfa Matrix label later that year. Return was released in November 2013 as a nine-song CD; some versions contain a bonus CD with remixes.

== Discography ==
- Forever (2003)
- Return (2013)

== Members ==
- Rexx Arkana - production, vocals (1999–present)
- Ronan Harris – lead vocals (1999–present)
- Joakim Montelius - loops (1999–present)
- Sebastian Komor - production, programming (2001–present)
- Stephan Groth – backing vocals (2002–present)
- Johann Sebastian - production (2005–present)
- Tom Shear – vocals (2005–present)
- Andylab – vocals (2009–present)
- Clint Carney – vocals (2009–present)
- Dräcos - production (2009–present)
- Daniel Graves – vocals (2009–present)
- Jared Lambert – vocals (2009–present)
- Maze – vocals (2009–present)
- Stefan Netschio – vocals (2009–present)
- P-O Svensson – vocals (2009–present)
- Daniel Myer – vocals (2013–present)
