= List of synth-pop artists =

Synth-pop (also known as electropop or technopop) is a music genre that uses the synthesizer as the dominant musical instrument. With the genre becoming popular in the late 1970s and 1980s, the following article is a list of notable synth-pop acts, listed by the first letter in their name (not including articles such as "a", "an", or "the"). Individuals are listed by last name.

== A ==
- ABC
- Adolphson & Falk
- Adult
- a-ha
- ALB
- Alizée
- Allie X
- Marc Almond
- Alphaville
- AlunaGeorge
- And One
- Animotion
- Annie
- Christopher Anton
- Anything Box
- ARO
- Art of Noise
- Ashbury Heights
- Assemblage 23
- The Assembly
- Au Revoir Simone
- Aural Vampire
- Aurora
- Austra
- Ayria

== B ==
- Karl Bartos
- Bastille
- Bastion
- Bat for Lashes
- Bear in Heaven
- Bebi Dol
- Beborn Beton
- Belanova
- Beograd
- Berlin
- Betty Who
- The Bird and the Bee
- The Birthday Massacre
- The Black Queen
- Blancmange
- B-Movie
- Bonanza Banzai
- Book of Love
- Boxcar
- Boytronic
- Bronski Beat
- The Buggles

== C ==
- C.C.C.P.
- Camouflage
- Capital Cities
- Capsule
- Casiokids
- Cause and Effect
- Celebrate the Nun
- ceo
- Chairlift
- Chappell Roan
- Charli XCX
- Chew Lips
- Chicks on Speed
- China Crisis
- Christine and the Queens
- Chromatics
- Chromeo
- Chvrches
- Vince Clarke
- Class Actress
- Client
- Cold Beat
- Cold Cave
- Com Truise
- The Communards
- Computer Magic
- Al Corley
- Cosmicity
- Crumbächer
- Crystal Castles
- The Cure
- Cut Copy

== D ==
- Dalek I Love You
- Dangerous Muse
- D' Boys
- Dead or Alive
- Delorean
- Denis & Denis
- Depeche Mode
- Desire
- Deutsch Amerikanische Freundschaft (D.A.F.)
- De/Vision
- Devo
- Thomas Dolby
- Donkeyboy
- Dragonette
- Dubstar
- Du Du A
- Duran Duran
- DyE

== E ==
- Elegant Machinery
- Eleventyseven
- Empire of the Sun
- Erasure
- Eurythmics
- Exotic Birds

== F ==
- The Fallout Club
- Harold Faltermeyer
- Fan Death
- Mylène Farmer
- Feathers
- Fenech-Soler
- Sky Ferreira
- The Flirts
- A Flock of Seagulls
- John Foxx
- Frankie Goes to Hollywood
- Frankmusik
- Freezepop
- Freur
- Future Islands

== G ==
- Gina X Performance
- Glass Candy
- The Golden Filter
- Goldfrapp
- Ellie Goulding
- Grafton Primary
- Great Good Fine Ok
- Grimes

== H ==
- Paul Haig
- Halsey
- Paul Hardcastle
- Calvin Harris
- Imogen Heap
- Heaven 17
- Holy Ghost!
- Hot Chip
- The Human League
- The Hundred in the Hands
- Hurts
- Hyperbubble

== I ==
- I Am the World Trade Center
- I Blame Coco
- iamamiwhoami
- Icehouse
- The Icicle Works
- Icona Pop
- Ien Oblique
- Imperative Reaction
- Indochine
- Information Society
- Iris

== J ==
- Japan
- Jean Michel Jarre
- Johnny Hates Jazz
- Jon and Vangelis
- Howard Jones
- Joy Electric
- Julien-K
- Junior Boys

== K ==
- Kajagoogoo
- Kate Boy
- Kazaky
- Nik Kershaw
- Kesha
- Kids of 88
- The Killers
- Kissing the Pink
- Kites with Lights
- The Knife
- Kon Kan
- Kozmetika
- Kraftwerk
- Kyary Pamyu Pamyu
- Kyros

== L ==
- La Roux
- Laboratorija Zvuka
- Lady Gaga
- Ladyhawke
- Ladytron
- Laid Back
- Lali Puna
- Lamb
- Laki Pingvini
- Landscape
- LANY
- Level 42
- Light Asylum
- Lights
- Linea Aspera
- Dua Lipa
- Little Boots
- Little Dragon
- Tove Lo

== M ==
- M
- M83
- Madeon
- Magdalena Bay
- The Magnetic Fields
- Mannequin Depressives
- Maretu
- Marina and the Diamonds
- Helen Marnie
- Marsheaux
- John Maus
- Max Vincent
- Mecano
- Melotron
- Javiera Mena
- Men Without Hats
- Mesh
- Metric
- Metro Station
- MGMT
- Miami Horror
- Midnight Juggernauts
- Miike Snow
- Slađana Milošević
- Ministry (early work)
- Kylie Minogue
- Mirrors
- Miss Kittin
- MNDR
- MØ
- Modern Talking
- Mœnia
- Momus
- Monarchy
- Giorgio Moroder
- Róisín Murphy

== N ==
- Yasutaka Nakata
- The Naked and Famous
- Naked Eyes
- NamNamBulu
- NASA
- Neon Indian
- New Musik
- New Order
- Neuroticfish
- Niagara
- Night Club
- Niki & the Dove
- No Doubt
- Gary Numan
- NYPC

== O ==
- Oh Land
- Onetwo
- Orchestral Manoeuvres in the Dark
- Our Daughter's Wedding
- Ou Est le Swimming Pool
- Owl City

== P ==
- Parallels
- Parralox
- Passion Pit
- Peaches
- Perfume
- Pet Shop Boys
- Phoenix
- Plastics
- The Postal Service
- The Presets
- Propaganda
- Pseudo Echo
- Psyche
- Purity Ring
- Pvris

== Q ==
- The Quick

== R ==
- Rational Youth
- Re-Flex
- Real Life
- Red Flag
- Porter Robinson
- Robots in Disguise
- Robyn
- Ronika
- Röyksopp
- Martin Rushent

== S ==
- Saint Etienne
- Sally Shapiro
- Sandra
- Say Lou Lou
- Scritti Politti
- Seabound
- Seona Dancing
- Shiny Toy Guns
- Shura
- Shy Child
- Silicon Teens
- Émilie Simon
- Simple Minds
- Slomljena Stakla
- Soft Cell
- Sohodolls
- Belouis Some
- Jimmy Somerville
- The Sound of Arrows
- Space
- Spandau Ballet
- Sparks
- St. Lucia
- Stock Aitken Waterman
- Swiss Lips

== T ==
- Talk Talk
- Tears for Fears
- Tegan and Sara
- The Teenagers
- The Weeknd
- Telex
- Tesla Boy
- Thompson Twins
- Tim & Jean
- Tiny Magnetic Pets
- TM Network
- Toro y Moi
- Trust

== U ==
- Uffie
- Ultravox
- U Škripcu

== V ==
- Van She
- Versa (Neon era)
- Videosex
- Visage
- Vitamin Z
- Vive la Fête
- VNV Nation

== W ==
- Washed Out
- Wet
- When in Rome
- Wolfsheim

== Y ==
- Yazoo
- Years & Years
- Yelle
- Yello
- Yellow Magic Orchestra
- Young Ejecta

== Z ==
- Zana
- Zeigeist
- Zola Jesus

== See also ==
- List of new wave artists
- List of post-punk bands
- Lists of musicians
