= Storm (Assemblage 23 album) =

Studio album by Assemblage 23
- Released: September 28, 2004
- Recorded: 2004
- Genre: Electronic; Electro music Synthpop; Electronic body music
- Label: Metropolis Records; Accession Records
- Producer: Tom Shear

Assemblage 23 chronology
Defiance (2002)	Storm (2004)	Meta (2007)

Singles from Storm
- 1. "Let The Wind Erase Me" Released: August 24, 2004; 2. "Ground" Released: November 23, 2004

Storm is the fourth album by the American electronic act Assemblage 23. It was released on September 28, 2004, on Metropolis Records and Accession Records. Storm is a much more layered album than any of Shear's previous work and the songs are much more optimistic in nature.

== Track listing ==
All songs written, performed and produced by Tom Shear

No.	Title	Length
1.	"Human"	5:43
2.	"Skin"	6:54
3.	"Ground"	5:06
4.	"Let The Wind Erase Me"	4:46
5.	"Infinite"	5:08
6.	"Complacent"	6:09
7.	"You Haven't Earned It"	5:33
8.	"Regret"	5:01
9.	"Apart"	5:11
10.	"30Kft"	3:15
