= Defiance (Assemblage 23 album) =

Studio album by Assemblage 23
- Released: October 22, 2002
- Genre: Industrial, electro, EBM
- Length: 55:22
- Label: Metropolis Records; Accession Records

Assemblage 23 chronology
Failure (2001)	Defiance (2002)	Storm (2004)

Defiance is Assemblage 23's third studio album, released through Metropolis Records and Accession Records in October 2002. The album contains the song "Document," released as a single prior to the release of Defiance. The album received high appraisal from electronic music magazine ReGen.

== Track listing ==
All songs written, performed and produced by Tom Shear.

No.	Title	Length
1.	"Opened"	5:56
2.	"Drive"	5:11
3.	"Blindhammer"	5:22
4.	"Cocoon"	5:58
5.	"Document"	5:15
6.	"Fallen Down"	5:46
7.	"Horizon"	7:33
8.	"Light"	4:27
9.	"Maps of Reality"	4:30
10.	"Lullaby"	5:24
