= Compass (Assemblage 23 album) =

Studio album by Assemblage 23
- Released: October 1, 2009
- Recorded: 2008–2009
- Genre: Futurepop; Synthpop; Electronic body music
- Label: Metropolis Records; Accession Records
- Producer: Tom Shear

Assemblage 23 chronology
Meta (2007)	Compass (2009)	Bruise (2012)

Singles from Compass
- 1. "Spark" Released: September 22, 2009

Compass is the sixth album by American electronic act Assemblage 23. It was released on October 1, 2009 on Metropolis Records and Accession Records.

== Track listing ==
All songs written, performed and produced by Tom Shear

No.	Title	Length
1.	"Smoke"	5:19
2.	"Collapse"	5:31
3.	"Impermanence"	4:36
4.	"How Can You Sleep?"	5:33
5.	"Spark"	4:39
6.	"Leave This All Behind"	4:17
7.	"Alive"	5:46
8.	"Greed"	5:53
9.	"Angel & Demons"	4:53
10.	"The Cruelest Year"	4:47

2-Disc Deluxe Edition
No.	Title	Length
11.	"Spark (Burikusu Remix)"	5:36
12.	"Grind"	3:53
13.	"Alone Again"	4:19
14.	"Chosen"	4:44
15.	"Greed (KMFDM Remix)"	4:58
