= Contempt (disambiguation) =

Contempt is an intense feeling or attitude of regarding someone or something as inferior, base, or worthless.

Contempt or contemptible may also refer to:

- Contempt (album), by Assemblage 23
- Contempt (film), by Jean-Luc Godard
- Contempt (novel), by Alberto Moravia
- Contempt of Congress
- Contempt of court
- Contempt of Parliament
- The Old Contemptibles, the British Expeditionary Force in World War I
