= Nekrolog =

Nekrolog (German for obituary) may refer to:

- Bach's Nekrolog, the obituary of German composer Johann Sebastian Bach (1685-1750)
- Nekrolog 43, a 2007 album by Diary of Dreams
