= Failure (Assemblage 23 album) =

Studio album by Assemblage 23
- Released: March 2001
- Genre: Industrial music Electro; Electronic body music
- Length: 58:34
- Label: Gashed! Records, Metropolis Records, Accession Records

Assemblage 23 chronology
Contempt (1999)	Failure (2001)	Defiance (2002)

Failure is Assemblage 23's second album, released through Gashed! and, later, Metropolis Records in 2001. The album contains many energetic EBM songs led by emotionally charged lyrics. Most notably from this album came the single "Disappoint," released just before Metropolis' re-release of Failure. The album peaked at #2 on the CMJ RPM Charts in the U.S., ranking #31 overall for year 2001.

== Track listing ==
All songs written, performed and produced by Tom Shear

1. Naked (6:01)
2. I am the Rain (6:40)
3. House on Fire (4:55)
4. Tried (6:23)
5. Disappoint (5:33)
6. Divide (6:01)
7. Longevity (6:40)
8. Silence (4:55)
9. Awake (6:31)
10. King of Insects (5:08)
