= Meta (Assemblage 23 album) =

Studio album by Assemblage 23
- Released: April 24, 2007
- Genre: Electro; synthpop; electronic body music
- Length: 57:24
- Label: Metropolis; Accession

Assemblage 23 chronology
Storm (2004)	Meta (2007)	Compass (2009)

Singles from Meta
- 1. "Binary" Released: March 20, 2007

Meta is the fifth album by American electronic act Assemblage 23. It was released on April 24, 2007, on Metropolis Records and Accession Records. Several tracks on Meta have the signature Assemblage 23 sound while others are slightly different in approach.

== Track listing ==
All songs written, performed and produced by Tom Shear

No.	Title	Length
1.	"Decades [V2]"	6.59
2.	"Raw"	5:07
3.	"Sorry"	5:32
4.	"Ghosts"	5:31
5.	"Binary"	5:42
6.	"Damaged"	6:01
7.	"Madman's Dream"	6:14
8.	"Truth"	5:33
9.	"Crush"	5:30
10.	"Old"	5:15
