= Rot (SITD) =

Studio album by SITD
- Released: 30 Oct 2009
- Genre: Electro-Industrial,
- Length: 54:46
- Label: Accession Records

SITD chronology
Bestie: Mensch (2007)	Rot (2009)	Icon:Koru (2011)

Rot is the fourth album by German, electro-industrial/aggrotech band, [:SITD:]. It was released in 2009 on the Accession Records label in Germany and on the Metropolis Records label in the United States. Accession Records also released a deluxe edition containing a bonus disc.

== Track listing ==
1. "The Insanity of Normality" – 1:43
2. "Catharsis (Heal Me, Control Me)" – 4:40
3. "Rot V.1.0" – 5:57
4. "Stigmata of Jesus" – 5:07
5. "Zodiac" – 4:55
6. "Pride" – 6:03
7. "Redemption" – 5:23
8. "Frontal" – 4:34
9. "Pharmakon" – 6:32
10. "MK Ultra" – 5:02
11. "Destination" – 4:51

== Bonus Disc ==
1. "The Insanity of Normality (Final)" – 4:26
2. "Rot V.2.0 (Extended)" – 8:18
3. "Rot [Remix by Reaper]" – 5:09
4. "Redemption [Remix by Project Pitchfork]" – 6:42
5. "Rot [Remix by S.A.M.]" – 4:45
6. "Rot [Remix by Aesthetic Perfection]" – 5:09
7. "Heldenhaft (Vox) [feat. Othura]" – 2:18
