= Old Citadel (Edmonton) =

Building in Edmonton, Alberta, Canada

The Starlite Room
- The Starlite Room
- Interactive map of The Starlite Room
- Former names: The Citadel, The Rev
- Location: 10030 102 Street NW; Edmonton, Alberta, Canada; T5J 0V6
- Coordinates: 53.53985°N 113.49595°W
- Seating type: Standing room and table seating

Construction
- Built: 1925
- Opened: 2004
- Renovated: 2017

Website
- www.starliteroom.ca/index.php

The Starlite Room is a 1925 brick building in Downtown Edmonton, Alberta, Canada, one block south of Jasper Avenue, the city's main street. The building was originally built as a "citadel" (church or place of worship) for the Salvation Army. By 1965 it was converted into the first venue of the Citadel Theatre company, with the company taking its name from the name of the building. After the company moved to a new purpose-built theatre building on Churchill Square in 1978, the building was converted to a concert hall and bar. The concert venue inside was for many years named the Rev Cabaret. Under this name, it hosted a variety of concerts including early 1990s shows of then-unknown American bands Nirvana and Green Day. In 2003 the Rev closed, and was reopened as the Starlite Room in 2004, which operates as a members-only club. The lounge/bar downstairs is called "River City Revival House" which opened in 2018.

Boocha, the first kombucha brewery in Edmonton, moved into the historic building in the fall of 2017.

== Concerts ==
The following are some of the artists that have performed at The Starlite Room:

- A-Trak
- Abigail Williams
- Adrian Belew Power Trio
- Against Me!
- Agnostic Front
- Alexisonfire
- Alkaline Trio
- All That Remains
- Amon Amarth
- Amorphis
- Anberlin
- ...And You Will Know Us by the Trail of Dead
- Arch Enemy
- Arkells
- As I Lay Dying
- Atmosphere
- Avenged Sevenfold
- Baroness
- Battles
- Bedouin Soundclash
- Big Sugar
- The Birthday Massacre
- Bison B.C.
- Brant Bjork
- The Black Dahlia Murder
- Black Lungs
- The Bouncing Souls
- Boys Night Out
- Divine Brown
- Behemoth
- Blind Guardian
- Built to Spill
- By Divine Right
- Cancer Bats
- Cannibal Corpse
- Caribou
- The Casualties
- Celtic Frost
- CKY
- Classified
- Comeback Kid
- controller.controller
- Converge
- Constantines
- Champion et ses G-Strings
- Melanie C
- Choke
- Chromeo
- Clutch
- Cracker
- The Creepshow
- Damageplan
- Daniel Wesley
- Dark Tranquillity
- Datarock
- The Dears
- Death by Stereo
- Death From Above 1979
- Decapitated
- Deicide
- Del the Funky Homosapien
- Destruction
- The Devil Wears Prada (band)
- Devin Townsend Project
- The Dillinger Escape Plan
- Dinosaur Bones
- Do Make Say Think
- The Donnas
- Dragonette
- Dread Zeppelin
- Dry Kill Logic
- Earthless
- Edguy
- Edward Sharpe & The Magnetic Zeros
- Electric Six
- Ensiferum
- Epica
- Fear Factory
- Feist
- Fintroll
- For Today
- Black Francis
- Frog Eyes
- From Autumn to Ashes
- The Gaslight Anthem
- Giant Sand
- Girl Talk
- God Forbid
- Matthew Good
- Guttermouth
- HammerFall
- Hatebreed
- The Haunted
- Hollywood Undead
- The Holly Springs Disaster
- Holy Fuck
- HorrorPops
- Ill Bill
- illScarlett
- The (International) Noise Conspiracy
- Islands
- Jakalope
- Johnny Marr
- Juliette and the Licks
- July Talk
- K-os
- Kate Voegele
- King's X
- KMFDM
- Kool Keith
- Korpiklaani
- Kreator
- Lacuna Coil
- Ladytron
- Lights
- LTJ Bukem
- Local H
- Mad Caddies
- Marianas Trench
- Mastodon
- Matt Mays
- Mayhem
- MC Conrad
- Metric
- The Midway State
- Mike Plume Band
- Minus the Bear
- Mindless Self Indulgence
- Misery Signals
- MGMT
- Mobile
- Moneen
- Moonspell
- Most Serene Republic
- Motion City Soundtrack
- Bob Mould
- MSTRKRFT
- Mumiy Troll
- Municipal Waste
- Murder by Death
- Nashville Pussy
- Necro
- Necrophagist
- Nightwish
- Nirvana
- No Use For a Name
- Norma Jean
- Obituary
- Omnium Gatherum
- Overkill
- The Parlor Mob
- Pelican
- Phantogram
- The Philosopher Kings
- Plain White T's
- Plants and Animals
- Poison the Well
- Pretty Girls Make Graves
- Priestess
- Propagandhi
- Protest the Hero
- Purity Ring
- The Red Jumpsuit Apparatus
- Rotting Christ
- Run The Jewels
- The Rural Alberta Advantage
- Said The Whale
- Saint Alvia
- Saosin
- Savages
- Saving Abel
- Secondhand Serenade
- Senses Fail
- She Wants Revenge
- Shadows Fall
- Shout Out Out Out Out
- Silverstein
- Silent Line
- SNFU
- Sleepercar
- Sleigh Bells
- Sloan
- Small Sins
- Social Code
- Soilwork
- Son Volt
- Sonata Arctica
- Soulfly
- Sparta
- The Spill Canvas
- The Smalls
- Stabilo
- Strvngers
- Stereos
- Strapping Young Lad
- Stratovarius
- Strung Out
- Suffocation
- Supersuckers
- Switchfoot
- Sworn Enemy
- the Tea Party
- Ted Leo and the Pharmacists
- Ten Second Epic
- Terror
- Therapy?
- Therion
- Thriving Ivory
- Thunderheist
- Tiga
- Tiger Army
- The Toasters
- Tortoise
- Tokyo Police Club
- Tsunami Bomb
- Tyler, The Creator
- Twin Shadow
- Unearth
- The Unseen
- David Usher
- Vader
- VNV Nation
- Cadence Weapon
- Josh Wink
- Wintersleep
- You Say Party! We Say Die!
- Zeke
- 3
- 3 Inches of Blood
- Thirty Seconds to Mars
- Questlove
