= Bruise (album) =

Studio album by Assemblage 23
- Released: June 12, 2012
- Recorded: 2011–2012
- Genre: Electro; Synthpop; Electronic body music
- Label: Metropolis Records; Accession Records
- Producer: Tom Shear

Assemblage 23 chronology
Compass (2009)	Bruise (2012)	Endure (2016)

Professional ratings
Review scores
Source	Rating
COMA Music Magazine	(Favorable)

Bruise is the seventh album by American electronic act, Assemblage 23. It was released on June 12, 2012 on Metropolis Records and Accession Records.

== Track listing ==
All songs written, performed and produced by Tom Shear

No.	Title	Length
1.	"Crosstalk"	4:38
2.	"The Last Mistake"	4:53
3.	"Over & Out"	4:09
4.	"The Noise Inside My Head"	4:14
5.	"Outsider"	5:32
6.	"Darkflow"	5:33
7.	"Automaton"	5:01
8.	"The Other Side Of The Wall"	4:20
9.	"Talk Me Down"	5:20
10.	"Otherness"	4:42

2-Disc Limited Edition
No.	Title	Length
1.	"Rain Falls Down"	4:36
2.	"The Last Mistake (Cesium_137 Remix)"	5:05
3.	"The Noise Inside My Head (Grendel Remix)"	4:51
4.	"Rain Falls Down (Daniel Myer Vancouver Tribute Remix)"	4:42
5.	"God Is A Strangely Absent Father"	5:00
6.	"The Noise Inside My Head (Sonik Foundry Remix)"	4:07
7.	"Rain Falls Down (iVardensphere Remix)"	4:37
8.	"The Noise Inside My Head (Boyz Inside My Bed Remix by Alter Der Ruine)"	4:45
9.	"The Last Mistake (Geoff Pinkney of Tenek Remix)"	4:40
10.	"Reckless"	5:01
