= Red Meat =

Red meat is meat from mammals, including beef, pork, and lamb.

Red Meat may also refer to:

- Red Meat (comic strip), a comic strip by Max Cannon
- Red Meat (band), a country band
- Red Meat (film), a 1997 film by Allison Burnett
- "Red Meat" (Supernatural), an episode of Supernatural

== See also ==
- Doneness, cooking gradations of meat which commonly refer to meat cooked to lower temperatures as "red"
- Red Red Meat, a 1990s alternative rock band
