= Final Selection =

German synthpop band

- Origin: Germany
- Genres: Synthpop
- Years active: 1993–present
- Labels: Currently none
- Members: Riccardo Schult; Mario Tews
- Website: Official site

Final Selection is a synthpop band from Germany founded in 1993 by Mario Tews (keyboards) and Riccardo Schult (vocals) featuring English lyrics. The band produces melancholic synthpop.

== History ==
The band's first demo tapes were released in 1993–1996.

Final Selection performed at the Wave Gotik Treffen festival in 1999, and at the EuroRock Festival in 2002 in Belgium.

The band has been remixed by Aslan Faction and NamNamBulu . Final Selection has remixed the band Wave in Head (which was released on the US records label A Different Drum) and the band Epsilon Minus.

Final Selection appeared on a number of compilations, amongst these the "Our Voices - A Tribute To The Cure" compilation that was released on the Irond label .

The band received favorable reviews by Side-line magazine.

== Discography ==
=== Albums and EPs ===
- AntiHero (LP, 2003, Black Flames Records)
- Heading for Graceland (EP, 2004, Black Flames Records)
- Meridian (LP, 2005, Black Flames Records)
- Clockworks (LP 2008, FlashpopMedia)
- Sirenˋs Call (LP 2023, Infacted Recordings)
