= Winky =

Winky may refer to:

== People ==
- Winky Hicks, American bluegrass musician and instrument maker
- Tice James (1914–1989), American Negro league baseball shortstop nicknamed "Winky"
- Winky Wiryawan (born 1978), actor from Indonesia
- Winky Wright (born 1971), American boxer

== Fictional characters ==
- Winky (Harry Potter), a character in the Harry Potter series
- Winky, Blinky, and Noddy, one of a trio of fictional comic book characters
- Winky (Donkey Kong), a character in Donkey Kong Country
- Wee Willie Winkie, a Scottish nursery rhyme

== Other uses ==
- Slang for penis, the primary sexual organ of male animals

== See also ==
- Wink
- Winkie (disambiguation)
- Winky D (born 1983)
- Winky Dink and You
