= Nekrolog 43 =

Studio album by Diary of Dreams
- Released: November 6, 2007
- Genre: Gothic rock Darkwave
- Label: Accession Records
- Producer: Adrian Hates

Diary of Dreams chronology
Menschfeind - EP (2005)	Nekrolog 43 (2007)	(if) (2009)

Nekrolog 43 is an album by the music group Diary of Dreams. The album was released on November 6, 2007.

== Track listing ==
No.	Title	Length
1.	"Nekrolog 43"	7:05
2.	"the Plague"	4:54
3.	"Son of a thief"	5:31
4.	"Tears of Joy"	5:20
5.	"UnWanted?"	4:18
6.	"Matching Lives"	7:00
7.	"Remedy Child"	4:56
8.	"Malice"	5:10
9.	"The darkest of all hours"	4:19
10.	"Congratulations"	6:41
11.	"alLone"	5:36
12.	"the Valley"	4:09
Total length:		71:39
