= Mourn (Assemblage 23 album) =

Studio album by Assemblage 23
- Released: September 11, 2020
- Genre: futurepop; synthpop; EBM
- Label: Metropolis Records
- Producer: Tom Shear

Assemblage 23 chronology
| Endure (2016) | Mourn (2020) |

Professional ratings
Review scores
| Source | Rating |
|---|---|
| Electrozombies | 4.1/5 stars |
| Elektro Fox | 6.2/10 stars |
| Soundscape Magazine | 8/10 stars |

Mourn is the ninth album by American electronic act Assemblage 23. It was released on September 11, 2020, on Metropolis Records.

Released during the COVID-19 pandemic, reviewers noted how it "touches on commonalities so ingrained in today’s’ first world problems" and the suffering of that year. Another reviewer pointed out that instead of sticking to Assemblage 23's normally very personal emotional content, Mourn combined this with the social concerns of the time. Sonically, reviewers found different genres represented on the album, from EBM and Industrial, to future pop, synth wave, and darkwave, to electropop. Multiple reviewers remarked on the symbolic connection between the album's subject matter of loss and mourning and its release date of September 11, which was the 19th anniversary of the September 11th attacks.

== Track listing ==
All original songs written, performed and produced by Tom Shear.

| No. | Title | Length |
|---|---|---|
| 1. | "Epiphany" | 6:44 |
| 2. | "Factory" | 5:04 |
| 3. | "Bloom" | 5:18 |
| 4. | "Anxiety" | 4:50 |
| 5. | "Confession" | 5:36 |
| 6. | "Dissonance" | 5:23 |
| 7. | "Welcome, Apocalypse" | 5:12 |
| 8. | "Could've" | 3:59 |
| 9. | "Tragedy" | 5:20 |
| 10. | "This House Is Empty" | 4:24 |
