= Nerve Filter =

Nerve Filter is an electronic music act from Franklin, Massachusetts (US); its sole member is Tom Shear. Nerve Filter started in 1995, and is considered a side project of Shear's Assemblage 23 although its first label appearance predated A23's.

== History ==
According to Nerve Filter's website, experiencing writer's block after writing Assemblage 23's Wires, Shear decided:

to do some tracks in a totally different style than he was accustomed to. The result was Nerve Filter. Combining elements of techno, and the then-popular rave sound, Nerve Filter was hard-edged and dark, but also exhibited a sense of humor in spots

According to Shear, the band's sound is difficult to categorize, with influences "including techno, dub, drum n' bass, IDM, detroit electro, acid, ambient, and many others."

== Discography ==
=== Albums ===
- Evasion of Primacy; 10 tracks (1996?; private release of less than 50)
- Linear, 23db Records (28 February 2006)
1. stealth
2. hey.daddy
3. option.one
4. sea.lab
5. slow.motion.shadow
6. machine.language
7. auto.mat
8. beneath.a.bed.of.wet.leaves
9. tweaker
10. sun.rise

=== Singles ===
- "MTV Sucks"; repurposes MTV samples
- "Back & Forth"; constructed almost entirely of Skinny Puppy samples

=== Compilation appearances ===
- DeathRave 2010 (1996; 21st Circuitry, SF)

- "Melting"; includes samples of Björk (leading The Sugarcubes)
- "Tech 153"; "hyper-rave" at 153bpm

- Dark Techno 1-9-9 (1998?; 21st Circuitry, SF)

- "Ritalin"; manic, almost drill and bass

=== Remixes ===
- "Remembrane" (remix of "Membrane"), Scar Tissue, Rebuild, 21st Circuitry (1998)
- "Be Broken (Unbreakable mix)", Converter, Proven in Action, First Aid Recordings
- "Storm Front (Brazilian Rust mix)", Prospero, Spreading the Infection, Subsession Records
