= Solutions for a Small Planet =

Studio album by Haujobb
- Released: 14 October 1996
- Recorded: Orbit-X, 1996
- Genre: Electro-industrial; IDM; techno
- Length: 71:18
- Label: Off Beat
- Producer: Haujobb

Haujobb chronology
Frames (1995)	Solutions for a Small Planet (1996)	Matrix (1997)

Professional ratings
Review scores
Source	Rating
Allmusic	4.5/5 stars

Solutions for a Small Planet is an album released by Haujobb on Off Beat records in 1996. It was released in the United States by the distributor Metropolis Records. It has been acclaimed for crossing boundaries of various electronic music genres.

== Track listing ==
All tracks are written by Daniel Myer and Dejan Samardzic, except for "Transfer" by Samardzic.

No.	Title	Length
1.	"Clockwise"	3:47
2.	"anti/matter"	4:28
3.	"Rising Sun"	4:15
4.	"Depths"	4:52
5.	"Sub Unit One"	4:00
6.	"Journey Ahead"	4:56
7.	"Distance"	6:08
8.	"Deviation"	4:40
9.	"Nature's Interface"	5:12
10.	"Sub Unit Two"	3:42
11.	"Cleaned Vision"	2:11
12.	"The Cage Complex"	6:25
13.	"Net Culture"	4:38
14.	"Transfer"	5:51
15.	"Sub Unit Three"	6:18
Total length:		71:18

Keeping with the album's cyber theme, the track "Nature's Interface" features a sample, "Whatever is out here we're gonna be the first humans to see", from the second season Star Trek: The Next Generation episode "Q-Who?", which featured the cybernetic Borg race as adversaries.

The album title is taken from an advertising slogan used by IBM in the mid-1990s.

== Personnel ==
haujobb

- Daniel Myer – vocals, programming, mixing, production
- Dejan Samardzic – programming, mixing, production

Additional personnel

- Andreas Fricke – saxophone (track 12)
- Guido Lefric – mixing
- Dagmar Tubes – artwork
