= Endure (Assemblage 23 album) =

Studio album by Assemblage 23
- Released: August 28, 2016
- Recorded: 2015–2016
- Genre: Futurepop; Synthpop; Electronic body music
- Label: Metropolis Records
- Producer: Tom Shear

Assemblage 23 chronology
Bruise (2012)	Endure (2016)	Mourn (2020)

Professional ratings
Review scores
Source	Rating
Electrozombies	4.1/5 stars
Reflection of Darkness	5/5 stars

Endure is the eighth album by American electronic act Assemblage 23. It was released on August 28, 2016, on Metropolis Records.

== Track listing ==
All original songs written, performed and produced by Tom Shear.

No.	Title	Length
1.	"Endure"	3:11
2.	"Afterglow"	4:40
3.	"Bravery"	5:12
4.	"Salt The Earth"	4:37
5.	"Static"	5:04
6.	"Call The Dawn"	5:35
7.	"Butterfly Effect"	5:19
8.	"Barren"	5:01
9.	"Grid"	4:43
10.	"December"	5:32

2-Disc Deluxe Edition
No.	Title	Length
11.	"Afterglow (The Rain Within Remix)"	4:22
12.	"Bravery (Interface Remix)"	6:23
13.	"December (Neuroticfish Remix)"	5:13
14.	"Ignorance"	4:34
15.	"Salt The Earth (Angeltheory Remix)"	4:32
16.	"December (Stereospread Remix)"	6:24
17.	"Bravery (Solitary Experiments Remix)"	5:28
18.	"Goliath"	5:07
19.	"Ignorance (Mr. Kitty Remix)"	4:22
