= Cleaner (band) =

German electronic music group

- Also known as: Cleen, Clear Vision
- Origin: Germany
- Genres: Electronic
- Years active: 1997–present
- Labels: Metropolis, Zoth Ommog, Accession
- Spinoff of: Haujobb
- Members: Daniel Myer
- Past members: Thorsten Meier
- Website: www.planet-myer.de

Cleaner is the name of a German project specializing in electronic music. Formerly known as Cleen, Myer released several albums on the American industrial music record label, Metropolis Records, as well as the labels Zoth Ommog and Accession Records.

== History ==
Cleen began as a side project of Haujobb's Daniel Myer, who teamed up with vocalist Thorsten Meier for the first few releases, beginning with 1997's Designed Memories. After the release of their second album, Thorsten Meier left to pursue other interests, and Daniel Myer assumed all musical and vocal duties. For the third release, Solaris, Myer changed the name of Cleen to Cleaner. Cleen, Cleaner, and Clear Vision have often been described as being more synthpop-oriented than Haujobb.

As of 2005, all of the Cleen and Cleaner releases are out of print.

== Discography ==
=== Cleen ===
- Designed Memories, 1998, CDEP
- Second Path, 1999, CD
- The Voice, 2000, MCD – #57 DAC Top 100 Singles of 2000

=== Cleaner ===
- Solaris, 2000, CD – #13 CMJ RPM Charts

=== Clear Vision ===
- The Call, 2002, CDS
- Deception, 2002, CD

== See also ==
- Haujobb
