= Culture Kultür =

Spanish electronic music project

- Origin: Málaga, Spain
- Genres: EBM; Synthpop; Futurepop
- Years active: 1992-Present
- Labels: Out of Line; Caustic
- Members: José Luis Clotet; Salva Maine; Distortiongirl (live)
- Past members: Francisco Gil (aka Wolfran)
- Website: www.culturekultur.com

Culture Kultür is a Spanish electronic music project, working primarily in the EBM and synthpop genres.

== History ==
The project formed in 1992 as a project of José Luis Clotet (aka Josua) and Dj Kultür (Fran) in Málaga, Southern Spain. Singer Salva Maine joined in 1999. The band evolved from a 80s alike EBM with distorted voices to a more electro sound with energetic beats, melodic synths and meaningful lyrics boosted by powerful vocals.

After their signing with Out of Line in 1999 they have supported the Mexican band Hocico in the Tierra Electrica '99 Tour, played in major festivals as WGT, M'era Luna, Infest & Eurorock, performing gigs in USA, Mexico and Canada, and included dozens of songs in different compilations.

Their EP "DNA Slaves" reached the 10th position in DAC charts (German alternative charts), and their second album, Revenge, contains hits that have been spun all over the world, becoming a club classic.

The band released the album Reborn in June 2005; it reached position 3 at the DAC charts, attaining number 29 out of the top 50 albums for 2005.

They released the album Spirit in 2010, after which time the band had a nine year period of slowed progress owing to "personal and health" issues. On 21 January 2019 Culture Kultür released their fifth studio album Humanity.

== Discography ==
=== Albums ===
- Bump! CD (Microscopic, 1998)
- Reflex CD (Out Of Line, 1999)
- Revenge CD (Out Of Line, 2001)
- Reborn CD (Out Of Line, 2005)
- Spirit CD (Caustic Records, 2010)
- Humanity CD (Caustic Records, 2019)

=== EPs ===
- Bass...Can You Hear Me? (1992)
- F.T.W. EP (1993)
- Spike (Microscopic, 1996)
- Rev.-Time EP (Microscopic, 1996)
- Default (Microscopic, 1997)
- Aftermath (Microscopic, 1998)
- Manifesto EP (Out Of Line, 1999)
- DNA Slaves EP (Out Of Line, 1999)
- Combat EP (Out Of Line, 2002)
