= Contempt (album) =

Studio album by Assemblage 23
- Released: 1999
- Genre: Industrial music, electro music, electronic body music
- Length: 71:26
- Language: English
- Label: Gashed!

Assemblage 23 chronology
Contempt (1999)	Failure (2001)

Contempt is the first album by Assemblage 23. In 1998, the Canadian label Gashed Records signed Assemblage 23 and released Contempt in 1999. Shortly afterwards it was re-released by Metropolis Records International. The album peaked at #8 on the CMJ RPM Charts in the U.S.

1. Anthem – 5:53
2. Surface – 5:04
3. Coward – 5:49
4. Bi-Polar – 5:57
5. Pages – 4:45
6. Purgatory – 5:48
7. Sun – 4:26
8. Skyquake – 6:29
9. Never Forgive – 4:28
10. 7 Days – 3:12
11. Coward [Melting Mix by Pain Station] – 7:12
12. Skyquake [Voice of God Mix by Manhole Vortex, Protocol X] – 6:17
13. The Drowning Season [DSKØ2k Mix by Ed Vargo of THD] – 6:06
