= Wave in Head =

Wave in Head is a one-man German synthpop music project, which was founded in 1993 in Magdeburg, Germany. His name is Michael Pohl.

The first musical activities have been nothing more than a hobby, when he started, to make some noises with his first sampler, the Ensoniq ASR-10. The style walks between skittering bass lines, well balanced bleeps, a catchy sing-along chorus and fancy, synth styled vocals. An interesting feature is that some lyrics are written in German as in the singles "Zeit zu leben", "Als Ob", "Ich denke nicht" and "Ist sie schön".

== History ==
In 1999, the project has reached a state of development that allowed production of a first CD, the rarely EP. It was distributed through the internet and had got very positive and enthusiastic reviews by several E-zines. The subsequent CD Criminal Ballad was not published, because it was made for promotion purposes only, and the debut album was in production yet. In winter 2000 Wave in Head performed live for the first time in Berlin and several record labels offered their cooperation.

Since the beginning of 2001, Wave in Head is signed to A Different Drum and released the debut album, Time to speak there, as well as the singles "progress" and "I began to hope" and stayed on the best selling chart for over 10 weeks.

Wave In Head also donated a song to the New Order tribute album "True Faith", covering "Blue Monday".

In 2005 the band released For a Special Moment plus the MCD "I hate to be in love"

After a longer break Wave in Head released a 4th album - The Voice in Me plus a digital single with the same name in 2010.

2012 was the year of the release of another album. Remixed was a mix of unreleased, new and rare, remixed tracks. Due to the falling meaning of real CDs it was available as limited edition CD (500 copies) and digitally as well as the successor Im Augenblick another album with all new songs.

Until 2013 Wave In Head has released all of his albums, (except for the self-produced EP Rarely), through the label, A Different Drum based in Salt Lake City. Meanwhile, all albums and singles are available thru CDBaby.com, I-Tunes, Amazon, Spotify and 2500 other online shops all over the world.

2022 started with news about another full-length album - Happiest Day. Release date: 02/22/2022. Despite the worldwide trend towards music streaming the German label IntraPOP produced a limited CD edition which was distributed by Pop-o-Naut followed by the remix album „Brilliance“ in 2023.

== Discography ==
1999 - Rarely - EP (self-distribution)

2000 - Criminal Ballad - promo album (self-distribution)

2001 - Time to Speak - debut album (A different Drum)

2001 - Progress - MCD (A Different Drum)

2001 - I Just Began to Hope - MCD (A Different Drum)

2002 - You - album (A Different Drum)

2002 - With You - MCD (A Different Drum)

2005 - For a Special Moment - album (A Different Drum)

2005 - I Hate to Be In Love - MCD (A Different Drum)

2010 - The Voice in Me - album (A Different Drum)

2010 - The Voice in Me - MCD (A Different Drum)

2012 - Remixed - album (A Different Drum)

2013 - Im Augenblick - album (A Different Drum)

2022 - Happiest Day - album (Intrapop)

2023 - Brilliance - remix album (Intrapop)
