= Let the Wind Erase Me =

Single by Assemblage 23
- Released: 2004
- Genre: Electro music Synthpop; Electronic body music
- Length: 61:26
- Label: Metropolis; Accession Records
- Songwriter(s): Tom Shear

Let the Wind Erase Me is the first single of the Storm album by Assemblage 23.

In October 2004, it reached #11 on the Billboard Dance Singles Sales chart.

== Track listing ==
1. "Let the Wind Erase Me [album version]"
2. "Darker"
3. "Let the Wind Erase Me [club version]"
4. "Tragic Figure"
5. "Let the Wind Erase Me [hard version]"
