= Winkie =

Winkie may refer to:

== Arts and entertainment ==
- Winkie Country, a place in the Wizard of Oz novels by L. Frank Baum, and its residents (Winkies)
- the title character of Wee Willie Winkie, an 1841 Scottish nursery rhyme
- Winkie (novel), a 2006 novel by Clifford Chase about a teddy bear accused of terrorism
- "Winkie", a 2006 short story by Margo Lanagan
- The Winkies, a British rock group

== People ==
- Winkie Direko (1929–2012), South African politician
- Nickname of Winkie Dodds (born 1958), Northern Irish loyalist activist
- Nickname of Winifred Griffin (1932–2018), New Zealand swimmer
- Nickname of Winkie Wilkins (born 1941), American politician

== Other uses ==
- Winkie, South Australia, a locality
- Winkie (pigeon), a Dickin Medal-winning pigeon
- "Winkies", a nickname of Winchester College football

== See also ==
- Winky (disambiguation)
