= Liebknecht =

Liebknecht is a German surname. Notable people with the surname include:

- Johann Georg Liebknecht (1679–1749), German theologian and scientist
- Karl Liebknecht (1871–1919), German socialist
- Sophie Liebknecht (1884–1964), Russian-born German socialist, second wife of Karl Liebknecht
- Theodor Liebknecht (1870–1948), German socialist politician and activist
- Werner Liebknecht (1905–?), German engineer
- Wilhelm Liebknecht (1826–1900), German Social Democrat, father of Karl Liebknecht
