= Max Vincent =

Serbian musician (1967–2004)

Vincent Max

Background information
- Born: Miodrag "Miša" Mihajlović; 1967; Belgrade, Yugoslavia
- Died: 2004 (aged 37)
- Genres: Yugoslav new wave; synth-pop
- Instruments: synthesizer, vocals
- Years active: 1985–2004

Miodrag "Miša" Mihajlović (1967 — 2004), known under the pseudonym Max Vincent, was a Serbian new wave and synth-pop musician.

== Biography ==
Vincent came from an artistic family — his mother was a violinist and vocal soloist of PGP-RTB, while his father was a bass guitarist and manager of jazz ensemble Plavi Ansambl. Vincent founded Max & Intro, his most well-known project, with high school classmate Zoran Ćalić, known as Intro Johnny. Their 1985 single "Ostavi sve" became a major hit upon its release. In his later years, Vincent moved to Italy where he continued working as a composer and at the same time working in Serbia. He was married to Serbian journalist Tatjana “Tanja”Vidojević. He died of a sudden heart attack on the street while coming home with a friend in 2004.

== Discography ==
As member of duo Max & Intro (together with Zoran Ćalić, known as Intro Johnny):

- We Design The Future (1985) — singles "Ostavi sve", "Beogradska devojka"
- "Loš je dan" (1986), single
- "Suze i smeh" (1989), single with Igor Popović from the group Jakarta
- "Return To The Future 1984-1994" Discom DCM-016 (2025) LP compilation with 12 songs

As member of Sančo i Max (together with Zoran Veljić Sančo):

- Kadilak (1993) — singles "Kadilak", "Kada sam te voleo", "Koliko ti je godina"
- Mapa je nađena (1998) — single "Budvanski festival"

Solo work:

- The Future Has Designed Us (2015, released posthumously) — compilation album of previously unreleased songs (1984-2002)
- Beograd (2018, released posthumously) — compilation album of previously unreleased songs (1986-1999)
