= Tom Shear =

American singer

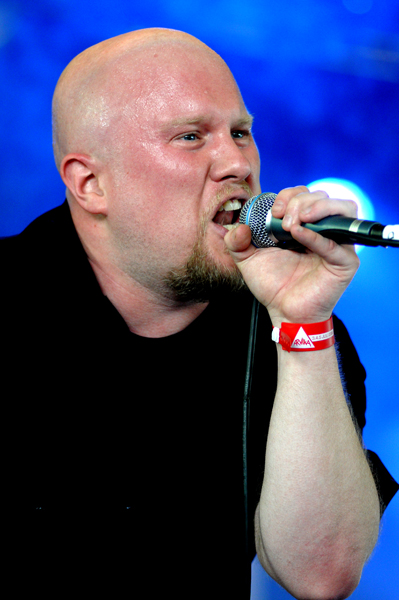
- Shear performing live with Assemblage 23, 2008

Background information
- Born: Tom Shear; November 12, 1971 (age 54)
- Origin: State College, Pennsylvania, US
- Genres: Industrial, electro, synthpop, EBM
- Occupation: Musician
- Instruments: Vocals, synthesizer
- Label: Metropolis Records

Tom Shear is an American musician and music producer, and is the sole member of the electronic act Assemblage 23.

He was born on November 12, 1971, in State College, Pennsylvania, where he lived until he was about age six. After that, he lived in New Jersey for two years and then in New Hampshire for around twelve years.

== Background ==
Shear's musical skills are self-taught. After teaching himself to play the piano, he took piano lessons for a couple of months, but he stopped when he found that they involved more "unlearning" of techniques he had taught himself than learning new techniques he could use. He graduated from Syracuse University in 1994 with a degree in TV and film production.

While still in high school in the late 1980s, he began creating instrumental synthpop music at home under the name Man on a Stage, as well as playing bass live for a punk-influenced band named The Advocates.

Shear credits the band Depeche Mode as having influenced him more than any other group towards the electronic music styles. Another significant influence came when he attended a Depeche Mode concert in 1988; Shear was astounded by the industrial dance music played by the opening DJ, and began incorporating industrial influences into his music. Man on a Stage was at this point retitled Assemblage 23.

== Personal life ==
Tom lives with his wife Mari Kattman who also sings in their project Helix.

== Assemblage 23 ==
Shear worked on Assemblage 23 throughout his college years, occasionally sending out demos to little effect. During the same time he collaborated with friends Matt Guenette and Mike Ukstins on a synthpop project named Procession, gaining experience with live performance.

In 1992, Shear self-released a collection called "Wires", which generated some buzz among minor radio stations and underground magazines, but still little interest from record labels. In the mid-1990s, he produced techno tracks for a side project called Nerve Filter which generated some interest at record label 21st Circuitry. The first "official" release of an Assemblage 23 song occurred when Arts Industria released "Graverobber" on their Construction No. 009 compilation. Shear kept writing Assemblage 23 songs and sending out demos despite his frustration over the lack of interest among record labels, later crediting the support and encouragement from his early fans for keeping him going.

In 1998, his perseverance paid off when the Canadian label Gashed! signed Assemblage 23 and released the group's first album, Contempt, in 1999. That same year, Shear's father committed suicide, and the resulting pain and loss is evident in the second album, Failure, released in 2001. Both albums achieved significant critical acclaim as well as popularity at dance clubs.

Shear left Gashed Records to sign with Metropolis Records, which re-released Contempt and Failure, and released the third album, Defiance, in 2002, and the fourth, Storm, in 2004. A track from Storm, "Let the Wind Erase Me", appeared on the Billboard Hot Dance singles chart.

Shear is also producer for the band backandtotheleft, and released their album Obsolete on his own label, 23db, in 2004 (later to be rereleased on Metropolis). He has also been known to act as guest vocalist for other musicians. In 2004, Shear also lent his talents to the band The Parallel Project.

Shear describes his sound as "melodic, danceable electronic music".
