= SITD =

German EBM and industrial band

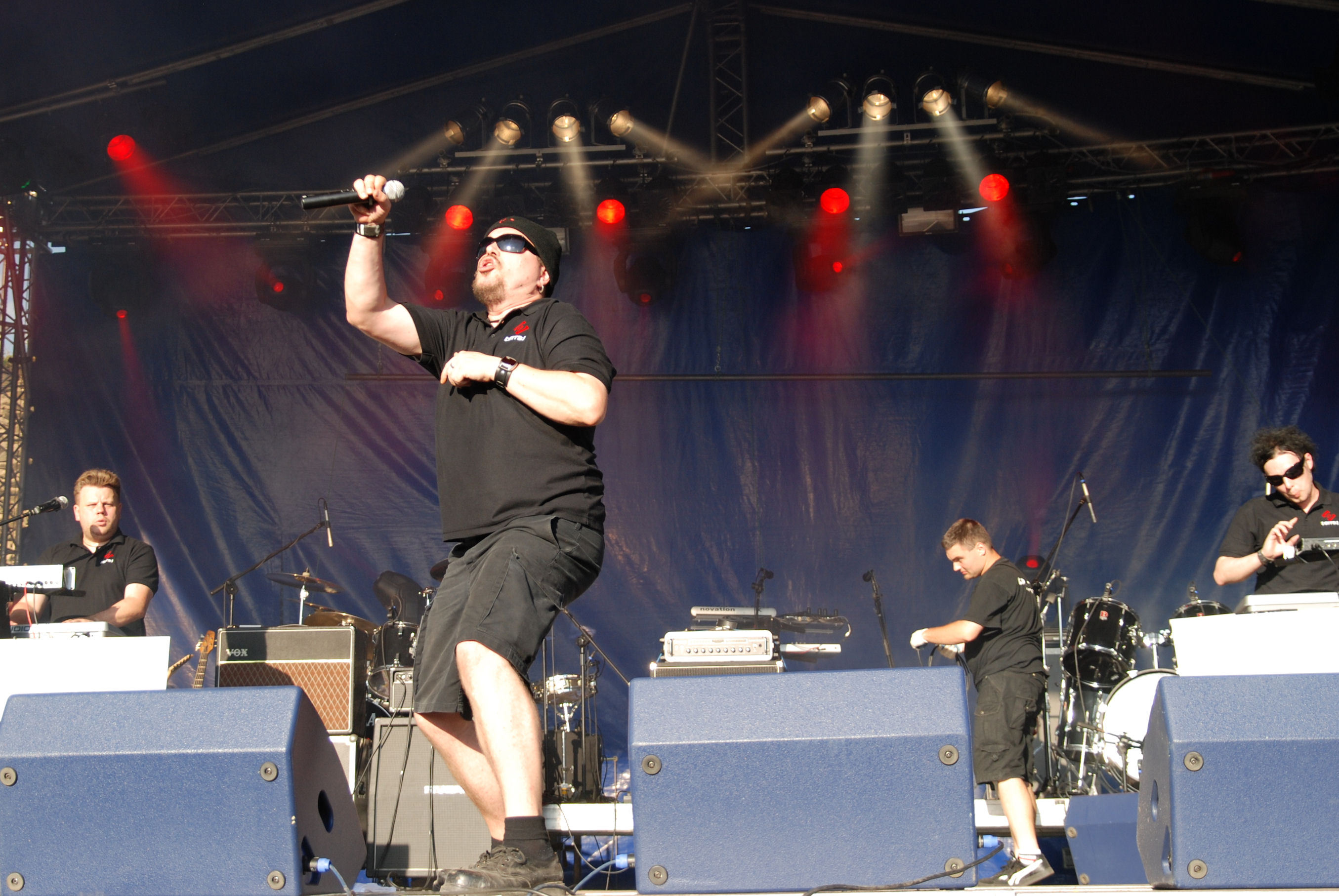
- SITD during their performance at Castle Party 2008

Background information
- Origin: Ruhr Area, Germany
- Genres: Industrial, EBM
- Years active: 1996–present
- Labels: Accession Records; Metropolis Records
- Members: Carsten Jacek; Francesco D'Angelo
- Past members: Thorsten Lau; André Sorge; Thomas Lesczenski
- Website: www.sitd.de

SITD, stylised [:SITD:], is a German EBM and industrial band consisting of vocalist Carsten Jacek and keyboardist Francesco "Frank" D'Angelo, the name an acronym for Shadows in the Dark.

== History ==
SITD was founded in 1996 by Carsten Jacek and Thorsten Lau in the Ruhr Area of Germany. In the next three years they self-produced and released their first two albums, mourning country (1996) and Atomic (1999). In 1999, Lau left the band to be replaced by Thomas Lesczenski. In 2001, André Sorge joined the band and they toured with VNV Nation and XPQ-21 on the Futureperfect tour. In 2001, SITD also released their largest hit single to-date, Snuff Machinery, which made liberal use of sampled dialogue from the German dub of the film 8mm, a 1999 US thriller dealing with snuff films. Sorge left the band by the end of the year.

In 2002, SITD released their first EP album, Snuff EP under the record label Accession Records and performed at the Zillo Festival.

In 2003, Francesco D'Angelo joined SITD and they released the EP Laughingstock and then the full-length album Stronghold. Stronghold reached the 2nd Position in the Top Album National category for 2003 on the Deutsche Alternative Chart (DAC) while Laughingstock peaked at #2 on the DAC singles chart, ranking #22 on the 2003 DAC Top Singles chart. They also performs at two major festivals: M'era Luna and Infest.

In 2004, they performed at the Zillo Festival (with Skinny Puppy), and the Elektronisches Hilfswerk Charity Tour with VNV Nation, Combichrist and NamNamBulu.

In 2005, they released the Coded Message:12 album as well as the EPs Richtfest and Odyssey:13. The band went on their Coded Message tour, and performed once again at the Zillo and M'era Luna festivals, as well as support act on VNV Nation's Formation Tour. By the end of the year they were in 3rd Position in the Top Single Act National category for 2005 on the Deutsche Alternative Chart (DAC).

In 2007, they featured as one of two acts (alongside Painbastard) on the double EP Klangfusion Vol.1. This was a prelude to the band's 3rd full-length album Bestie:Mensch. The limited edition of this album featured a 2nd CD compiling a number of remixes SITD had assembled for other bands over the years. In 2008 the band remixed two songs from industrial metal group Eisbrecher's Sünde album This is Deutsch and Kann denn Liebe Sünde Sein.

In 2010, they toured with VNV Nation on their Faith, Power, and Glory tour.

== Discography ==
=== Studio albums ===
- 2003: Stronghold
- 2005: Coded Message: 12
- 2007: Bestie:Mensch
- 2009: Rot
- 2011: Icon:Koru
- 2014: Dunkelziffer
- 2017: Trauma:Ritual
- 2019: Stunde X

=== EPs ===
- 2002: Snuff E.P.
- 2005: Odyssey:13
- 2016: Brother Death
- 2019: Sturmlicht
- 2019: Requiem X

=== Singles ===
- 2003: Laughingstock
- 2005: Richtfest
- 2007: Klangfusion Vol. 1 - Kreuzgang/Nyctophobia (Double single, Split with Painbastard)
- 2024: Brieselang

=== Demos ===
- 1996: Trauerland
- 1999: Atomic
