= Clear Vision =

- Developer: Eldring Games AB
- Publisher: Eldring Games AB
- Platforms: iOS, Android, Adobe Flash
- Release: September 4, 2007
- Genre: Tactical shooter
- Modes: Single-player, multiplayer

Clear Vision is a 2007 tactical shooter video game developed by the Swedish developer Eldring Games and was for a period the most downloaded game in the Android Appstore.

== Plot and gameplay ==
The game's plot revolves around a sniper-for-hire named Tyler Smith, who journeys from ordinary guy to professional hitman. A violent premise is part of this game, which also uses a melodramatic plot, and these are ironically twinned. Stick figures in Clear Vision. The narrative tone in the games involves dark humor and satire.

Tyler started out as a janitor in a supermarket, but after constant abuse from his employer, he knocked him down with one punch and sought a new job immediately. He applied as a receptionist, lightbulb repairman, gardener, pool boy, school caretaker, floor sweeper, and a window cleaner, but he was out of luck.

Failing to find a job, and with not even a hundred dollars to his name, Tyler grabbed his hunting rifle and did some target practice, and later advertised (presumably on the deep web) as a hitman for hire.

He got his first letter posted through his door with a picture of a 37-year-old man named "Marc", along with a letter, asking for Tyler to waste him, in exchange for $800. Tyler found Marc on the streets and shot him in the head from behind bushes.

A short time later, Tyler received another letter, from a middle-aged man, explaining that his teenage daughter's headmaster was blackmailing her, and threatening to lower her grades as to ruin her chance of getting into college. The letter explained that the headmaster often dined at Burger Lord, so Tyler went to the fast food joint.

Tyler found him, and killed him with his rifle from behind bushes some distance away, earning $1,550. A short time later, Tyler received another letter, from a man explaining that a pizza guy was banging his wife. Attached to the letter was the pizza place's number, with instructions to order a pizza to 16 Hanonstreet, Bumville. Tyler ordered the pizza, went near the address, and popped the pizza guy for $1,450.

The next day, when Tyler arrived back at his apartment complex, his landlord, Doug, asked if he was okay, before reminding him about needing the previous month's rent. A few weeks later, after completing a few more assignments, Tyler had plenty money, buying himself new shades, a sharp suit, and a sports car. That day, when he arrived back home, he paid off his debts to Doug and went upstairs.

Some days later, after doing more assignments, Tyler awoke one night to find a man wearing a fedora sat across from his bed, wielding a handgun. Tyler went for his own handgun, but the intruder pulled it out, before calling for "Ron". Then, a large man with a baseball bat entered the bedroom. Fedora explained that Tyler was getting in the way of their business.

However, before he was able to shoot Tyler, Doug came from behind and whacked Ron with a rake. Fedora shot Doug a couple of times and tried to shoot Tyler, but he'd jumped out of his window and escaped. That evening, Tyler was miserably boozing in a dive, when a beautiful young blonde woman approached him, offering to cheer him up.

When Tyler looked up, he stuttered at how little clothing she was wearing (a red tube-top and mini-skirt), making her giggle. Tyler asked why she was in such a bar, and the woman said it was the only place to find decent men. Tyler proclaimed not to be decent, but the woman took his hand and said she'd be the judge. The next morning, Tyler awoke in her fancy apartment in amazement.

After a year of being and living with Diana, Tyler was now working from his private account on her computer, rather than through post. After doing a few more "tasks", Tyler visited Doug, who was still in hospital. After a few days, Tyler got back home to find Diana gone, and a note from Fedora. After a short while, stewing over his girlfriend's kidnapping, Tyler packed his guns and went to his friend's house.

Tyler let Steve know that he'd lost everything, so he let him stay on his couch. A couple of months after the kidnap, Tyler got a call from Steve to meet him in an alleyway. Once there, Steve introduced Tyler to an old hobo who apparently saw some guys with Diana. After paying the guy, Tyler found out that Fedora and Ron were taking "a young beautiful woman" to the docks, and that she seemed tense. One of the men, who was a large guy, often drank and played pool at Nemo's Bar and Pool on the weekends.

Days later, now during the weekend, Tyler and Steve went to the bar and found Ron playing pool, so they quietly sat and waited from afar. Once Ron left the bar, Tyler sneaked behind him in the alleyway and knocked him out with a bat. Ron awoke to find himself strapped to a machine that ran a large buzzsaw. Tyler interrogated Ron as he slowly moved him towards the saw, before he gave in. Ron said that Diana was alive when he last saw her, but didn't give a location, so Tyler had him sliced in half, slowly starting from the groin.

Days later, Tyler was watching TV on the couch as Steve ate cereal, when a letter was posted through the door. Tyler read it, since it was addressed to him, and it said that he should go to the harbour if he wants to see Diana alive. Tyler quickly loaded Steve's M4 carbine and left. Upon arriving, he was shot at by some thugs, so he quickly dispatched them and found the back room, where Fedora was hiding. Tyler heard muffled shouting coming from a chest, executed Fedora, and opened the chest, revealing Diana.

Tyler helps Diana out of the chest, and they share a very long kiss.

Years later, Tyler is seen living in a new house as he wakes up in the morning. As he opens the curtains, Diana calls him downstairs for breakfast with her and their young daughter, Jennifer. Whilst caring for his family, Tyler still leads a double life and works as an assassin in secret. However, after a botched gig, Tyler is forced to speed away from the police, as they had been on his tail for years.

Some time later, he takes his family on a boat trip. After arriving back at the docks after the trip, Tyler sees Diana and Jennifer off the boat, saying he'll catch up; he is actually setting a timed explosive on the boat. Tyler jumps off the boat in diving gear whilst Diana and Jennifer aren't watching, just before the bomb detonates, blowing up the boat and seemingly killing Tyler. As Diana and Jennifer scream with grief, Tyler swims away, now legally dead.

== Release history ==
The first Clear Vision game was published by FDG Entertainment 2008 in Adobe Flash and has been played over 100 million times.

Eldring Games has released four more mobile versions of Clear Vision on iOS and Android which has been installed over 35 million times worldwide.
