= Colony 5 =

Swedish futurepop/synthpop/EBM band

- Origin: Sweden
- Genres: Futurepop, Synthpop, EBM
- Years active: 1999–present
- Labels: Infacted Recordings (Germany), Memento Materia (Sweden), Underground, Inc. (US)
- Members: P–O Svensson, Magnus Kalnins
- Past members: Magnus Löfdahl, Johan Nilsson

Colony 5 is a Swedish futurepop/synthpop/EBM band founded in March 1999. P–O Svensson started the band as a hobby with Magnus Löfdahl. The music style has changed with group membership and their sound became more consistent. They have toured through Europe – Denmark, Russia, Germany, Belgium, Holland, Switzerland, Poland, Norway, Estonia as well as the United States, and Mexico.

On 14 December 2007 Colony 5 released the first single from their then-upcoming full-length album, Buried Again. The "Knives" MCD showed off a harder sound as a first taste of what the album would sound like. Buried Again was released in February 2008 on Memento Materia for Scandinavia, Infacted for Germany and ArtOfFact in the USA.

== Members ==
- P-O Svensson (1999–present)
- Magnus Löfdahl (1999–2001)
- Johan Nilsson (2001–2003)
- Magnus Kalnins (2002–present)

== Discography ==
=== EPs and singles ===
- "Colony 5" (2002)
- "Follow Your Heart" (2002)
- "Black" (2003)
- "Fate" (2004)
- "Plastic World" (2005)
- "Knives" (2007)

=== Albums ===
- Lifeline (2002)
- Structures (2003)
- Colonisation (2004)
- Fixed (2005)
- Buried Again (2008)
