= The Retrosic =

German electro-industrial project

- Origin: Germany
- Genres: Aggrotech, electro-industrial
- Years active: 2001–present
- Label: Metropolis Records
- Members: Cyrus; Zaide

The Retrosic is a German electro-industrial project.

== History ==
The Retrosic project was born in April 2001 with the release of the debut Prophecy. The Retrosic's second release, Messa da Requiem, reached the top of the Deutsche Alternative Charts in 2002, and was named "Album of the Year" by the Dutch Alternative Charts.

The Retrosic's third album God of Hell saw the line-up expand to a full band, seeing the incorporation of elements as diverse as soprano vocals, Indian flutes, trombones and oriental rhythms into the project's sound. Two years later, Nightcrawler was released, introducing breakbeat rhythms and guitar sounds into the group's sonic palette.

These releases earned a number of accolades in the scene press, but despite this, the project had not yet performed live at this stage. They finally made their live debut at the 2007 Wave-Gotik-Treffen festival. This performance was recorded for future release as a live DVD.

== Discography ==
- Prophecy (2001)
- Messa da Requiem (2002)
- God of Hell (2004)
- Nightcrawler (2006)
