= Ien Oblique =

American electronic band

ien oblique ('ēn ōˈblēk) is an American electronic band that formed in the United States in 2007, and is composed of singer/songwriter Jared Lambert, Juan Espinosa and Bryant Griffin. Their debut album, Drowning World, was released on November 30, 2012, on Infacted Recordings. The band—mixing elements of Futurepop, synthpop and EBM—has also been featured on a number of alternative-electronic European compilations, including Schwarze Nacht Vol. 6, Extreme Traumfänger Vol 12, Zillo 05-2011, Infacted 4 and Infacted 5.
