= Syrian (band) =

Italian musical ensemble

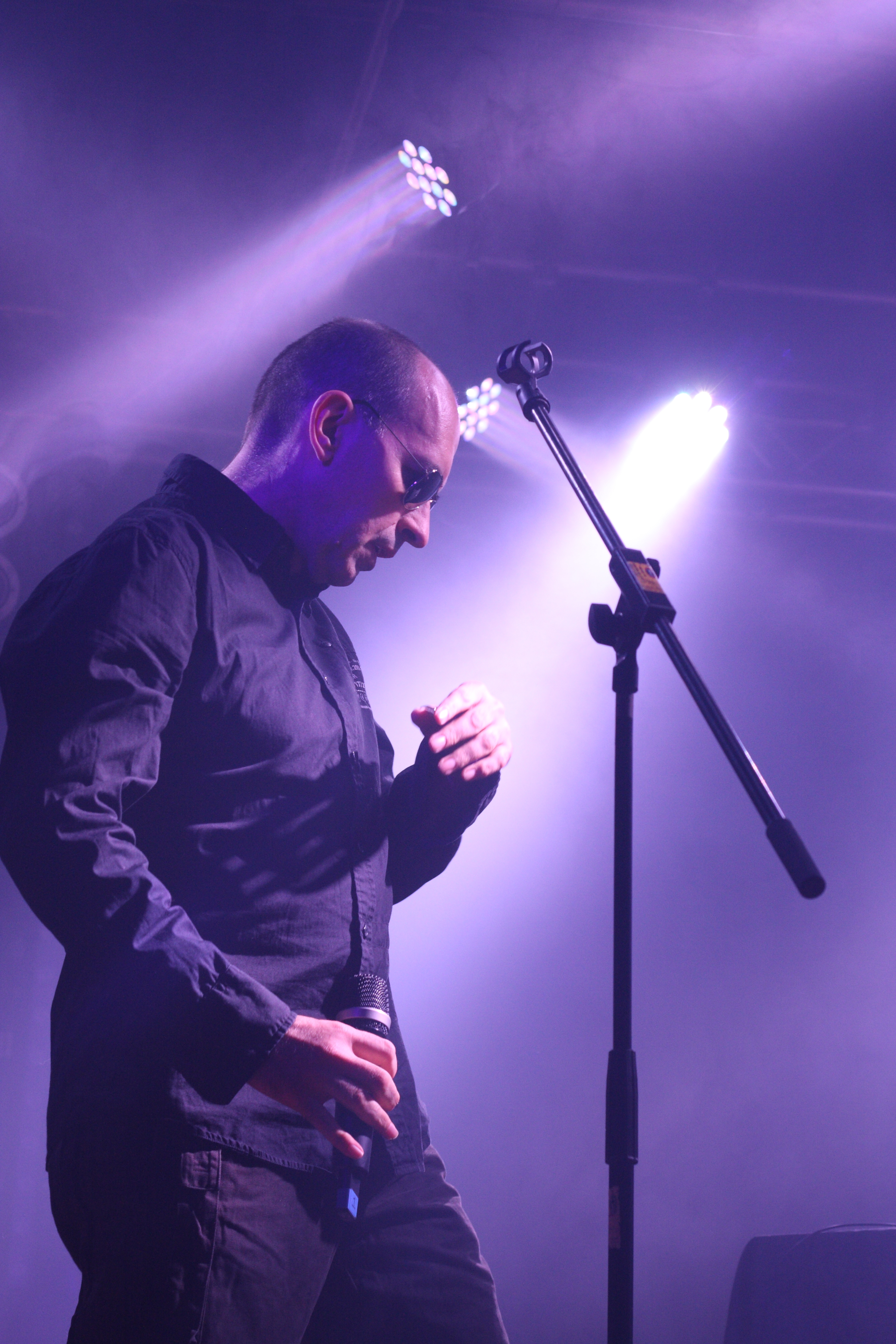
- at Infest 2015

Background information
- Origin: Italy
- Genres: Futurepop, Synthpop, Trance
- Years active: 2001–present
- Labels: A Different Drum, Infacted
- Members: Andylab (Andrea Peluso); Voyager (Lorenzo Bettelli)
- Website: spacetalk.net

Syrian is an Italian Futurepop, synthpop band, formed by Andylab (Vocals, Synthesizers, Vocoder) and Voyager (Synthesizers, Production, Vocoder). The band was once signed to A Different Drum, the largest Synthpop record label in the world in the early to mid 2000s.

Syrian has released 5 albums, 4 singles, 1 EP and 2 compilation albums since 2003.

In 2005, Syrian performed live in the US.

As of 2016 the band continues to perform live shows in Europe, while maintaining an active presence on the internet with their fans.

In late 2016 Syrian posted a short video on YouTube with track snippets, which indicated a new album was in the works for 2017. However, the release was delayed and was eventually released on September 3, 2018.

== Discography ==
- 2003: No Atmosphere (Single)
- 2003: De-Synchronized (Album)
- 2004: Space Overdrive (Single)
- 2004: Cosmic Gate (Single)
- 2005: Enforcer EP (EP)
- 2005: Kosmonauta (Album)
- 2007: Alien Nation (Album)
- 2012: Alternate and Remixed .01 (Compilation)
- 2013: Death of a Sun (Album)
- 2014: Supernova (Club Rework) (Single)
- 2016: Alternate and Remixed .02 (Compilation)
- 2018: Sirius Interstellar (Album)
