= Strvngers =

Canadian post-punk duo

- Origin: Edmonton, Alberta, Canada
- Genres: Post-punk, gothic rock, darkwave, new wave, alternative rock, synthpop, electropop, industrial, electronic, electronic body music
- Years active: 2015–present
- Label: Negative Gain Productions
- Members: Maria Joaquin
- Past members: Kyle Craig

Strvngers are a Canadian post-punk duo.

== History ==
Strvngers is a darkwave/post-industrial duo from Alberta, formed in early 2015. Their debut release, Sonic Erotica, was independently released on January 23, 2016. The album caught the attention of local fans and the U.S. label Negative Gain Productions. The duo subsequently joined Negative Gain Productions for their self-titled album Strvngers (2016).

The album caught the attention of the Calgary post-punk music festival Terminus, earning them an opening spot for Cold Cave on Terminus:Gravity and opening for 3TEETH on Terminus:Impact.

On April 20, 2018, the duo released their third album Amor/Noir (2018), which received praise from publications such as ReGen Magazine and The Spill Magazine. The album's success led to a performance at SXSW (2018).

Their fourth album titled Death Is The Only Way Out was released on November 8, 2019, gaining coverage in Revolver Magazine and a slot at Infest, where they opened for Peter Hook & the Light.

In late 2020, they released Zayka (2020). However, in early 2022, Strvngers announced the departure of Kyle Craig and have since been on hiatus.

== Discography ==
=== Albums ===
- Sonic Erotica (2016)
- Strvngers (2016)
- Amor/Noir (2018)
- Death Is The Only Way Out (2019)

=== EPs ===
- Zayka (2020)

=== Singles ===
- Nostalgia (2016)
- Girls Just Wanna Have Fun (2016)
- Death Is The Only Way Out (2019)
- Frailty (SLOW DEATH version) (2020)
- Vita Brevis (2020)
- Disintegration (2020)

=== Compilation albums ===
- Exhumed Vol. 1 (2017)
- Exhumed Vol. II (2018)
