= Beborn Beton =

German synthpop band

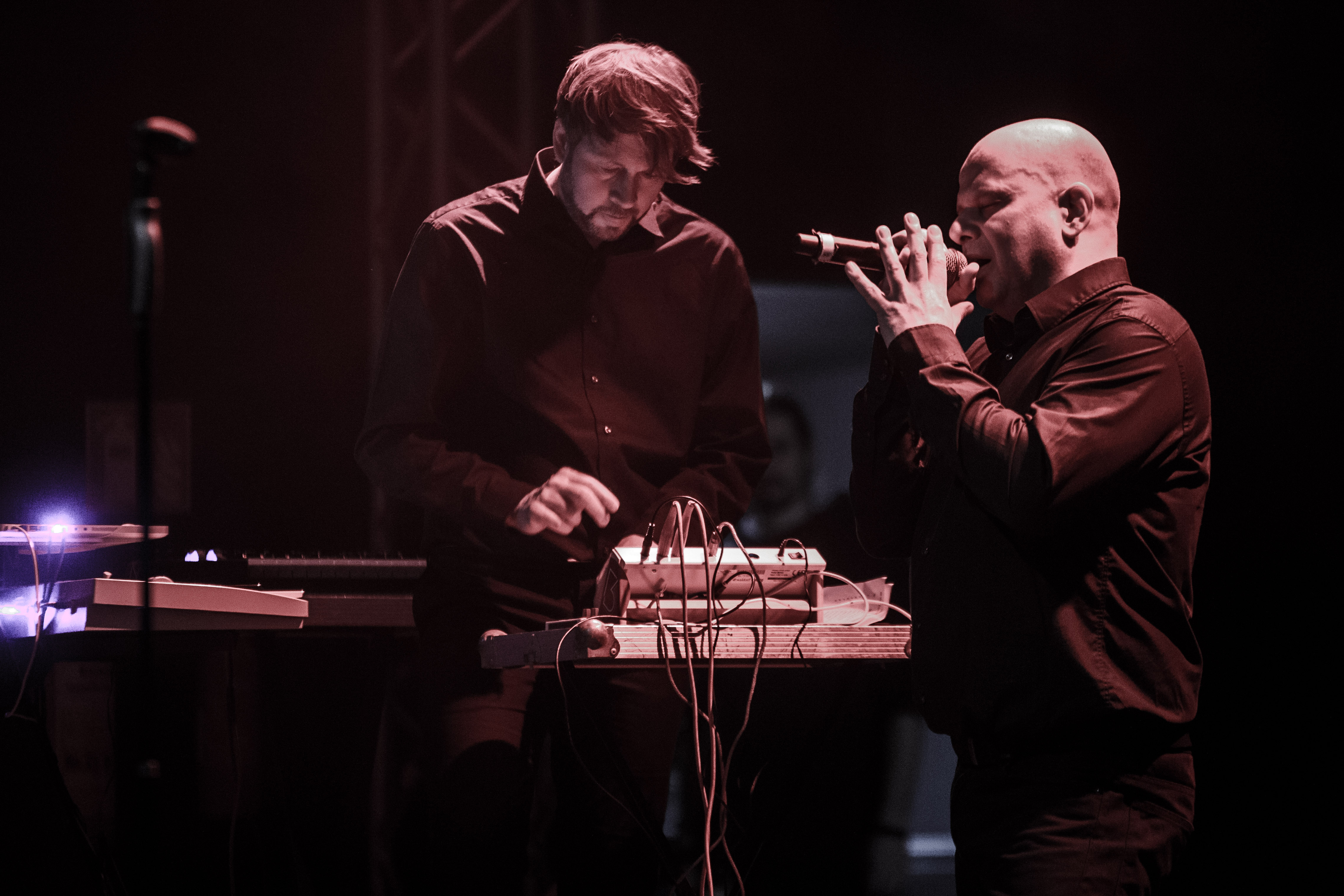
- Beborn Beton performing in 2016

Background information
- Origin: Essen, Germany
- Genres: Synthpop, EBM
- Years active: 1989–present
- Labels: Subtronic; Dark Star; Strange Ways; Wtii, LLC
- Members: Stefan "Till" Tillmann; Michael B. Wagner; Stefan Netschio
- Website: bebornbeton.de

Beborn Beton is a German synthpop band founded in 1989, with their first album release in 1993. Their debut named Tybalt is a compilation of the best tracks written in the first three years of their band history and was very well received in the electronic music scene. In 1995 the follow-up album Concrete Ground was released. After a change of record label in 1996 their break-through album Nightfall was published featuring the club-filler "Im Innern Einer Frau".

The album Rückkehr zum Eisplaneten was released in 2000. It features remixes of Beborn Beton songs by artists such as Covenant, Camouflage, Neuroticfish and Daniel Myer of Haujobb, as well as remixes by Beborn Beton.

The word Beborn has no particular meaning, while Beton is the German word for concrete, which according to the band refers to the urban environment they grew up in.

== Members ==
- Stefan "Till" Tillmann, composing, synthesizers, drums
- Michael B Wagner, composing, synthesizers
- Stefan Netschio, lyrics, vocals

== Discography ==
1. Tybalt 1993 (Label: Subtronic)
2. Twisted 1993 (Label: Subtronic)
3. Concrete Ground 1994 (Label: Subtronic)
4. Nightfall 1996 (Label: Strange Ways)
5. Tybalt 1997 - Re-Release (Label: Dark Star)
6. Truth 1997 (Label: Strange Ways)
7. Another World 1997 (Label: Strange Ways)
8. Concrete Ground 1998 - Re-Release (Label: Strange Ways)
9. Poison 1999 (Label: Strange Ways)
10. Fake 1999 (Label: Strange Ways)
11. Fake Bonus 1999 (Label: Strange Ways)
12. Rückkehr zum Eisplaneten 2000 (Label: Strange Ways)
13. Tales from another world 2002 (Label: Wtii, LLC)
14. A Worthy Compensation 2015 (Label: Dependent)
15. She Cried EP 2016 (Label: Dependent)
16. Darkness Falls Again 2023 (Label: Dependent)

== Remixes for other artists done by Beborn Beton ==
  - Apoptygma Berzerk – Kathy’s Song
  - Infam – Limbo
  - Claire Voyant – Majesty
  - Funker Vogt – Under Deck
  - Cleen – The Voice
  - De/Vision – Your Hands on My Skin
  - Clan of Xymox – Something Wrong
  - Camouflage – I Can’t Feel You
  - In Strict Confidence – Seven Lives
  - Wolfsheim – Approaching Lightspeed
  - Virtual Server – The Earth (featuring Reagan Jones of Iris)
  - Technoir – Manifesto
  - Technoir – All in My Head
  - Purwien – Alle Fehler (featuring Joachim Witt)
  - Helalyn Flowers – DGTal Blood
  - Purwien – So kalt
  - James D. Stark – Ready
  - Lyronian – Life is a Show
  - Ad Inferna – Vertige
  - Minerve – My Universe
  - Parralox – Moonwalking
  - Zynic – Dreams in Black and White
  - The Mystic Underground – Pride Of St. Mark’s
  - Weareoff – Chymera
  - The New Division – Honest
  - Diskodiktator – Inte så svårt
  - Blitzmaschine – Uncontrollable
  - SITD – Dunkelziffer
  - Love? – I Walk Alone
  - The Gothsicles – Give Me One More Chance to Get the High Score, Then We Can Go
  - The Gothsicles – Sword Cane
  - Rroyce – Who needs?
  - Halo Effect – Alone
  - Adam is a girl – Salt
  - Zynic – Side Effects
  - Torul – Explain
  - Torul – The Sooner The Better
  - Solitary Experiments – Crash & Burn
  - Blaklight – Nightmares
  - Rohn-Lederman – It Hurts!
  - Presence Of Mind – Lonely Like Me
  - The Mystic Underground – The Lonely Ones
  - KY – Grey Room
  - unitcode:machine – Cold
  - Unify Separate – Dying On The Vine
  - Chiasm – Chasing Butterflies
