= Red Meat (band) =

Red Meat is a country band that has released the albums Meet Red Meat (1997), Thirteen (1999), Alameda County Line (2001) and We Never Close (2007). Red Meat formed in 1993 from the remains of the country/surf/polka band The Movie Stars, and the Genuine Diamelles, whose sound was described by their members as a "psychedelic glee club". The last three albums were produced by Dave Alvin, and engineered by Mark Linett. An additional live album, Live at the World's Smallest Honky Tonk, was released in October 2010.

The song "Broken Up and Blue" from Thirteen is featured on the soundtrack of the 2001 movie Monster's Ball. The pit orchestra at the Academy Awards played the song when Halle Berry accepted her award for best actress.

Red Meat has won "Wammies" for best country band, along with a "Best of the Bay" award from the San Francisco Bay Guardian and "Best of the East Bay" award from the East Bay Express.
