= Haujobb =

German electronic musical project

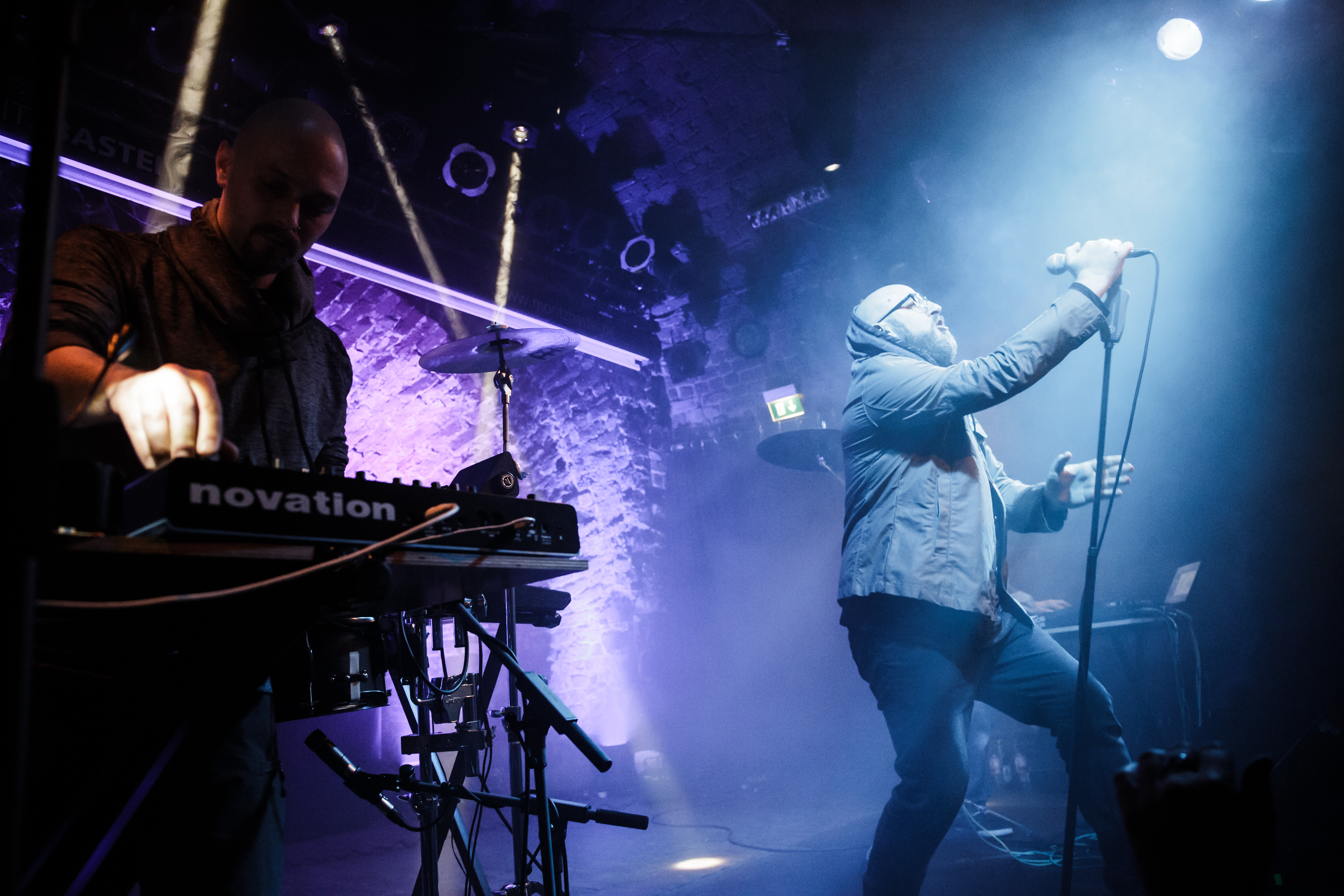
- Haujobb live at Planet Myer Day 12, January 10th, 2014

Background information
- Also known as: haujobb. (1992–1996)
- Origin: Bielefeld, Germany
- Genres: Industrial; techno; breakbeat; IDM; progressive house; drum and bass; ambient; electro-industrial
- Years active: 1992–present
- Labels: Tympanik Audio; Metropolis; Accession; Pendragon; Off-Beat
- Spinoffs: Dots+Dashes; Architect; Clear Vision; Newt; HMB; Destroid
- Members: Daniel Myer; Dejan Samardzic
- Past members: Björn Junemann

Haujobb is a German electronic musical project whose output has ranged drastically within the electronic music spectrum, from electro-industrial to ambient and techno. They have become a staple crossover act, bringing several forms of electro into the mainstream industrial music world.

== History ==
Haujobb was formed in 1992 by Daniel Myer, Dejan Samardzic, and Björn Junemann. Hailing from Germany, the trio were inspired by the music of Skinny Puppy, as Myer recalls: "When Too Dark Park was released... this was the initiative for us to make this kind of music." The name comes from the German translation of "skin job" from the film Blade Runner. (Note: "It's supposed to be "Hautjobb", from the movie "Bladerunner". In the movie it's "Skinjob", but when we watched the movie in German I couldn't hear the "T" sound, so I just heard "Haujobb" and it made kind of sense. In German "Haujobb" means something like... beating up someone. In the movie it’s a term for showing no respect to the androids... they call them "Skinjobs", like calling "nigger" a black guy. It sounded to me something negative for something that doesn't exist yet, and it was cool!") They were soon signed to Off Beat, and began distributing their music in North America via Pendragon Records.

Following the release of Freeze Frame Reality in 1995 saw the departure of bandmate Björn, the lineup has consisted of Daniel and Dejan ever since. After Metropolis Records acquired Pendragon, the two musicians have been able to spread their music to a larger fanbase in North America, and have remained continuously popular in the European industrial music scene.

Over the course of their subsequent releases in the 1990s, they wove increasing amounts of drum 'n' bass and IDM influence into their sound. 1996's Solutions for a Small Planet marked the first stylistic deviation, including production credits by Guido Fricke of dark ambient duo La Floa Maldita and saxophone credits from Fricke's brother Andreas. 1999's NinetyNine deviated further into a sparse, downtempo collection of ambient electronic compositions. They have since reintroduced some of the more rhythmic elements back into their sound on their more recent albums, but have continued to experiment, drawing concepts from a wide variety of musical styles.

In 2011, Haujobb released a new album with the title New World March which according to the band uses more hardware, guitars, drums, and sound recordings compared to software based Vertical Theory of 2003.

In 2013 Haujobb created their own production label, Basic Unit Productions, and began releasing other artists such as Div|ider, Blush Response, and Black Nail Cabaret. Basic Unit Productions also released two compilations under the title Frost. In September 2015, Haujobb released the minimal-wave influenced, Blendwerk on Basic Unit Productions in Germany and on Negative Gain Productions in the United States. In early Haujobb liner notes and credits, Daniel was listed as D. Meier, however in more recent liner notes he is listed as Daniel Myer.

In 2024, Haujobb released a pair of singles in advance of their planned tenth album, The Machine in the Ghost. The first of the two singles, "In the Headlights", reached number two on the German Alternative Charts (DAC). The second single, "Opposition", featured a vocal collaboration with Emese Árvai-Illés of Black Nail Cabaret.

== Projects ==
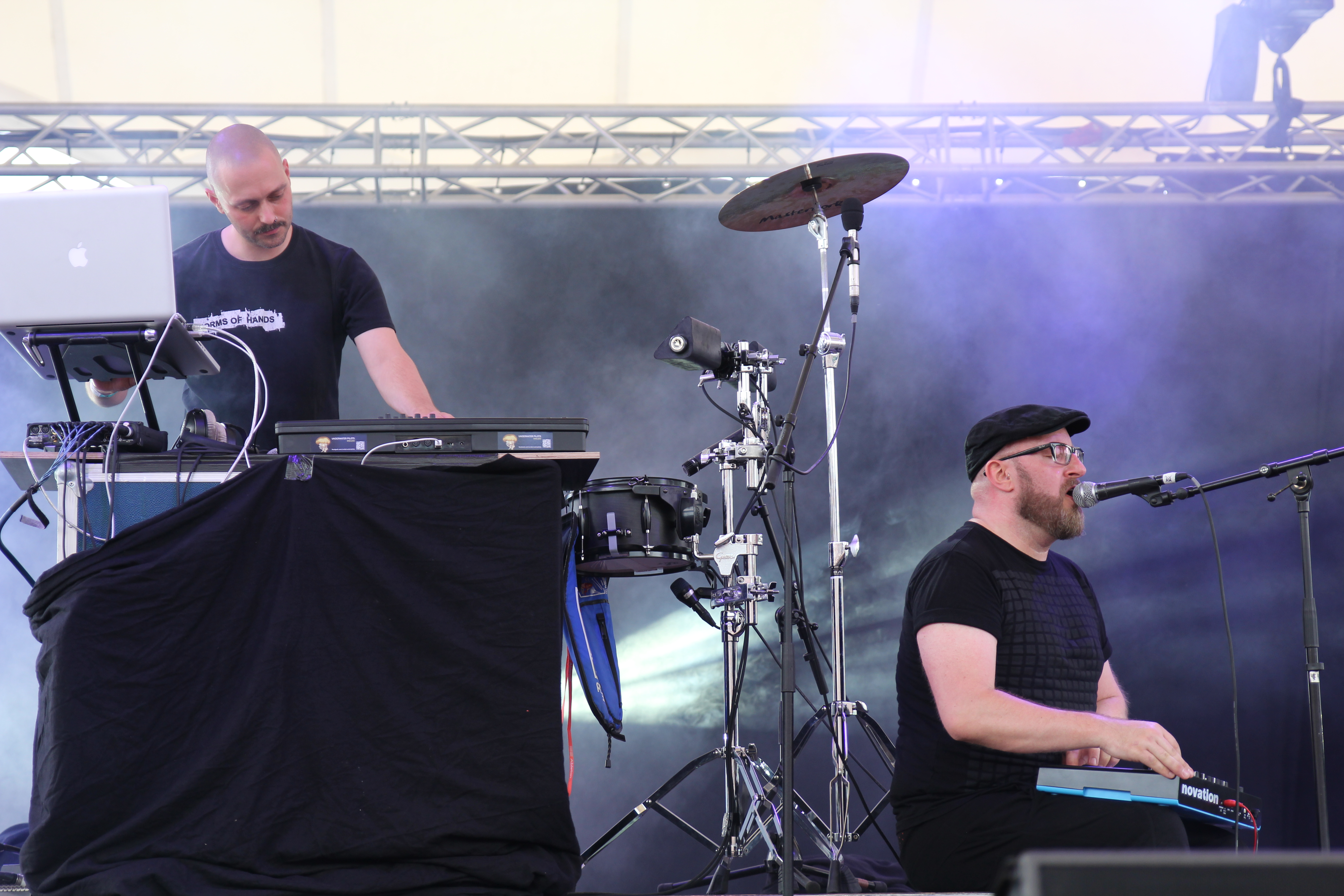
Haujobb at Blackfield Festival 2014, Germany

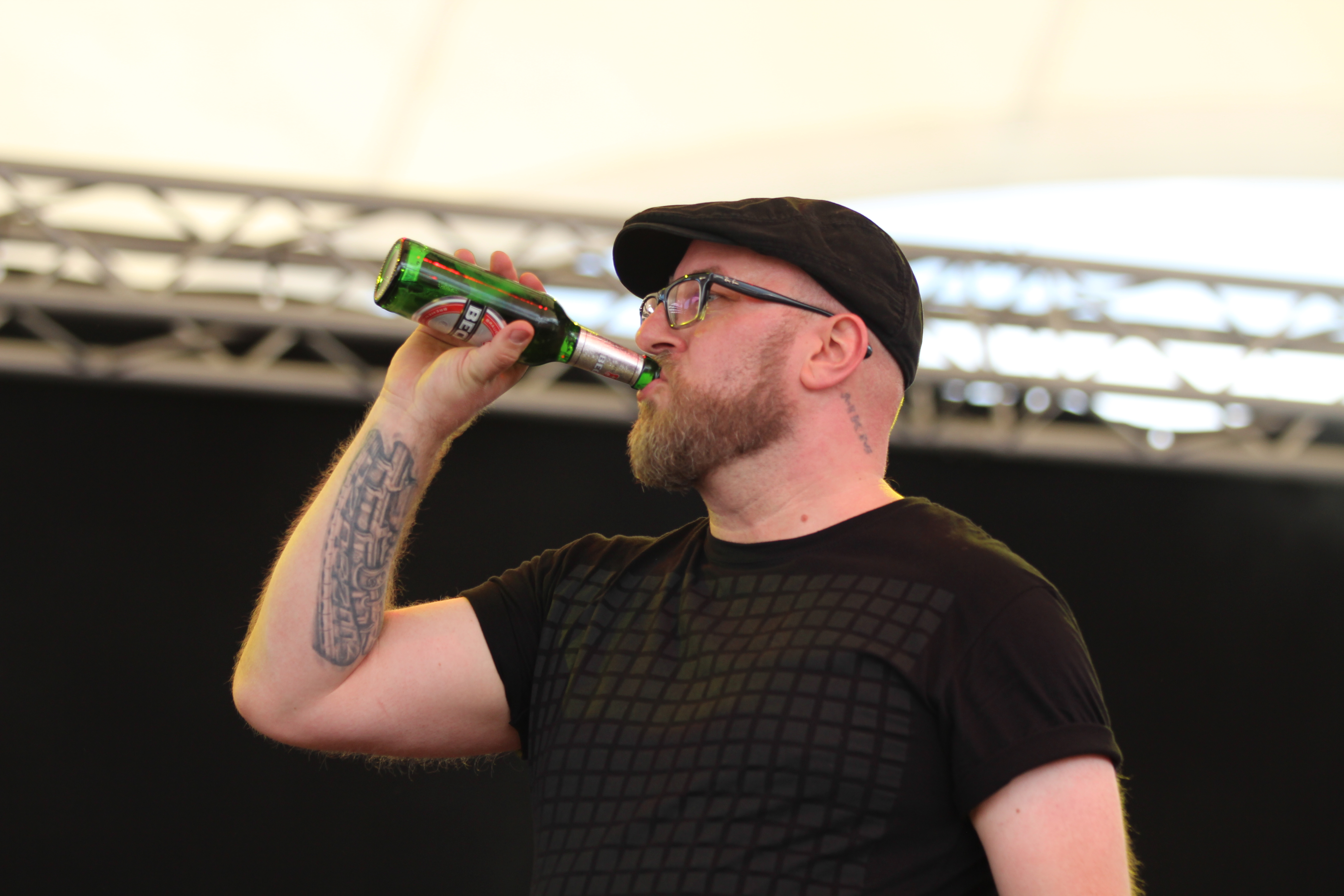
Daniel Myer

Today, both Daniel Myer and Dejan Samardzic continue to record music under the name Haujobb – the duo also briefly recorded as Dots+Dashes. Myer has several other projects of his own, including Architect, Clear Vision (initially a collaboration with Thorsten Meier) as well as a number of other short-lived electronic projects. Myer, along with Claire Voyant's Victoria Lloyd, form HMB. While Newt is a collaboration with Andreas Meyer of Forma Tadre. More recent side-project collaborations of Myer include DSTR (f/k/a Destroid), also featuring Rinaldo Ribi Bite and Sebastian Ullmann, and Radioaktivists with Frank M. Spinath, Krischan Jan-Eric Wesenberg and Sascha Lange. Daniel Myer also created the soundtrack for the Xbox game Tao Feng: Fist of the Lotus.

== Band members ==
=== Current members ===
- Daniel Myer – programming, production, vocals (1992–present)
- Dejan Samardzic – programming, production (1992–present)

=== Former members ===
- Björn Jünemann – programming, sampler (1992–1995)

=== Session/touring musicians ===
- Manuel G. Richter – synthesizer, noise, drums (2010–present) (a.k.a. Xabec) (also appeared on "New World March" (2011), "Input Error" (2015), "Blendwerk" (2015), "Alive" (2018))

=== Former session/touring musicians ===
- Sven Jünemann – guitar (1994–1995) (on "Eye Over You" (1994) and "Freeze Frame Reality" (1995))
- Gabriel Shaw – synthesizer, noise, drums (2012) (a.k.a. Ionnokx)

== Discography ==
=== As Haujobb ===
Studio albums

- Homes & Gardens (1993)
- Freeze Frame Reality (1995)
- Solutions for a Small Planet (1996)
- Ninetynine (1999) #16 CMJ RPM Chart
- Polarity (2001) #4 CMJ RPM Chart; #27 CMJ RPM for year 2001
- Vertical Theory (2003)
- New World March (2011)
- Blendwerk (2015)
- The Machine in the Ghost (2024)

Extended plays, singles

- "Eye Over You" (1994, single)
- Frames (1995, EP)
- "Cleaned Visions" (1996, single)
- The Remix Wars: Strike 1 (1996, split with Wumpscut)
- "Less" (1998, single)
- Penetration (2002, EP)
- Smack My Bitch Up (2007, EP)
- "Dead Market" (2011, maxi-single)
- Let's Drop Bombs (2012, EP)
- "Letting the Demons Sleep" (2013, single)
- "We Must Wait" (2014, single)

Others

- Drift Wheeler (1993, demo)
- Electronic Live Performance (1996, live album)
- From Homes to Planets (Mission Summery 93-97) (1997, compilation)
- Matrix (1997, remix compilation)
- Ninetynine Remixes (1999, remix compilation)
- Vertical Mixes (2005, remixes compilation) – #4 German Alternative Charts (DAC)
- New World March - The Remixes (2011, remixed compilation)
- Alive (2018, live album)

=== As Cleaner/Cleen/Clear Vision ===
- See separate article

=== As Destroid ===
- Future Prophecies (2004)
- Loudspeaker (2007)

=== As DSTR ===
- Silent World EP (2010)

=== As Architect ===
- Galactic Supermarket (1998) – #39 CMJ RPM Chart
- Galactic Edge 12" (1998)
- I Went Out Shopping To Get Some Noise (2003)
- Noise Is Out Of Stock 12" (2005)
- The Analysis Of Noise Trading (2005)
- Lower Lip Interface (2007)
- Consume Adapt Create (2010)
- Upload Select Remix (2011)
- Upload Select Remix 2 (Digital only release) (2011)
- Mine (2013)
- Mine Remixes 2 (2014) (featuring remixes Dreissk and Textbeak)

=== As h_m_b ===
- Great Industrial Love Affairs (2001)

=== As Newt ===
- -273°C (1997)
- Phaseshifting EP (1998)
- 37°C (1999)

=== As Dots+Dashes ===
- Aircutter EP (1997)
- Dots & Dashes (1998)
- Selected Drum Works Vol 1 EP (1998)

=== As Aktivist ===
- Ein Abend Mit Mir... 12" (1998)

=== As S'Apex ===
- Out There Back On 12" (1998)
- Audiodesign (1999)
- Henryk Remixes (2000)

=== As Hexer ===
- R:A Vs. Hexer: Compress (1998)
- Hexer Vs. Omega Men (1998)
- Hexer vs. Crunch (1999)
- Paradoxon I & II (1999)

=== As Myer ===
- Contra Technique (1998)
- Style 12" (1997)
- Pressure Drop (1998)
- Leavin' Space (1998)

=== As Standeg ===
- Ultrahightechviolet (2008)
- Rushing Pictures EP (2008)

== See also ==
- List of industrial music bands
