= Assemblage 23 =

American electronic music act

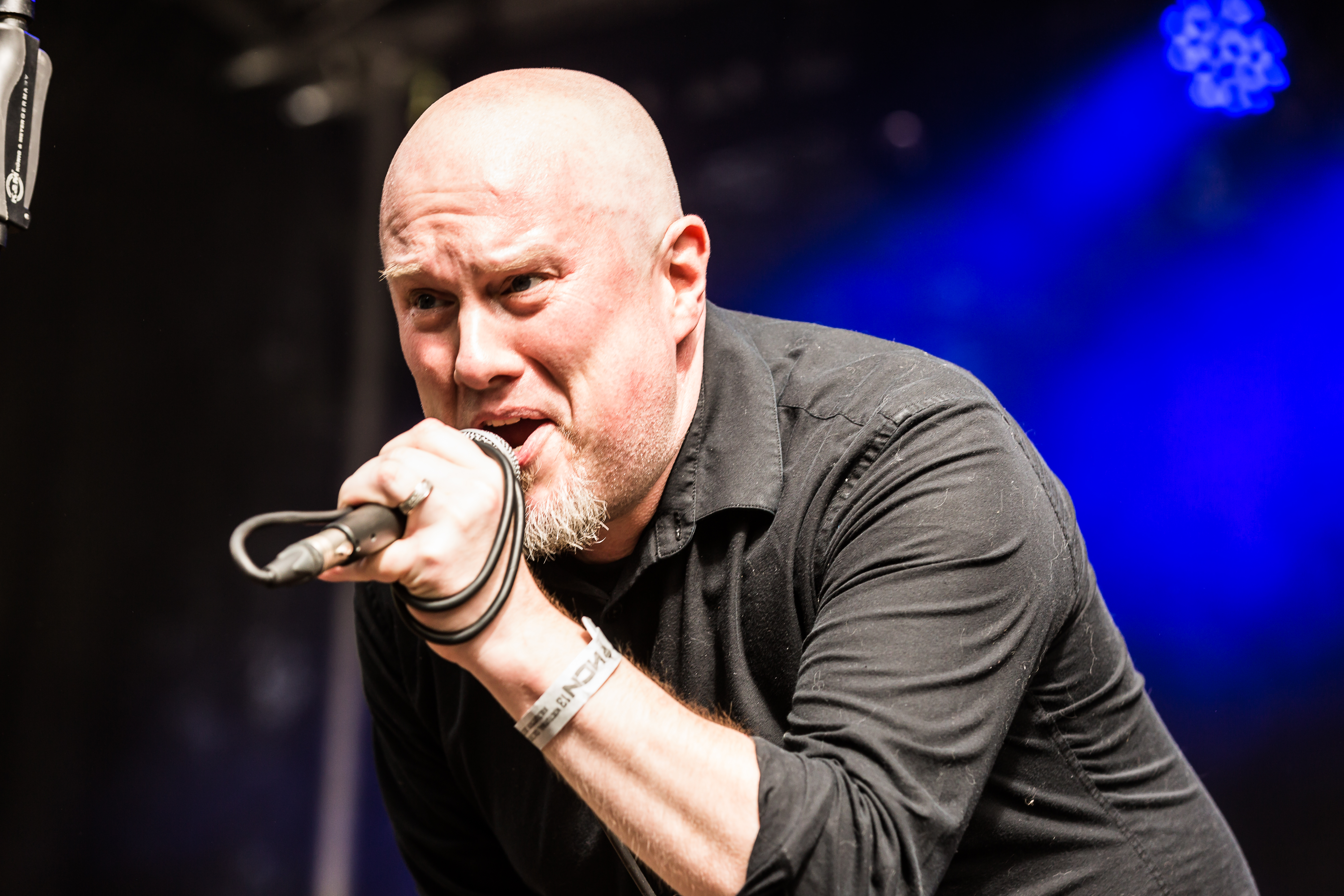
- Assemblage 23 at Nocturnal Culture Night in Germany 2018

Background information
- Origin: Exton, Pennsylvania, United States
- Genres: Futurepop; Electro-industrial; Synth-pop; Electronic body music
- Years active: 1988–present
- Labels: Gashed!; Metropolis; Accession
- Spinoffs: Nerve Filter; Surveillance; Helix; Ed Flesh; Thy Fearful Symmetry
- Members: Tom Shear; Paul Seegers; Mike Jenney
- Website: www.assemblage23.com

Assemblage 23 is an electronic act from the United States, currently based in Franklin, Massachusetts. It was founded in 1988 by Tom Shear who writes the music and lyrics and does the recording himself. Live performances are supported by Paul Seegers on keyboards and Mike Jenney on drums.

== History ==
=== 1980s–1990s (pre–Assemblage 23) ===
Prior to starting Assemblage 23, Shear experimented with music under the name Man on a Stage, beginning in the early 1980s. Most of Shear's music at this point was instrumental, as he lacked the confidence to sing; the quality of the music itself was highly questionable by his own admission. Shear eventually began to add vocals to his music; at the same time, Shear was also playing bass in a live band called the Advocates.

Assemblage 23 was officially born in 1988, after Shear experienced the industrial dance music played by an opening DJ for Depeche Mode. The style of this genre deeply impressed Shear; he believed he had finally found the sort of sound he wanted for his music. Even so, the project was more of a hobby for Shear at this point; it took until 1998 for Assemblage 23 to gather enough positive acclaim to attract the attention of record labels. Depeche Mode themselves were also a formative influence, as were Devo, the Human League, Fad Gadget, and OMD.

=== Late 1990s – early 2000 ===
Shear signed a deal in 1999 with the Canadian label Gashed! for a full-length album (Contempt, released in November 1999). Contempt ranked #42 on the DAC Top Albums of 2000 chart in Germany. A second album, Failure, followed in March 2001 and was released by Gashed in North America and Accession Records in Europe. A single from Failure, "Disappoint", was released on Accession in October 2001. The song dealt with Shear's sense of loss after his father's suicide on October 28, 1999, and features a sample from the film In the Line of Fire.

After falling out with Gashed Records following Failure, Shear signed with US label Metropolis Records (US) later in 2001; Metropolis re-released Contempt and Failure in November. A remix release, Addendum, was also released in November only on Accession. By this point, Assemblage 23 had become fairly popular within the EBM genre and closely catalogued alongside the "futurepop" genre, which Shear himself characterized — possibly tongue-in-cheek — as "mostly people who can't sing, over 90s-era trance patches."

The third album, Defiance, was released in October 2002 on Metropolis and Accession, preceded by the single "Document", in September of that year.

Assemblage 23 released a fourth album, Storm, in October 2004 with singles "Let the Wind Erase Me" in August and "Ground" in November. "Ground" spent eight weeks on the DAC Singles chart peaking at #2.

=== Mid 2000 – present ===
In March 2007, Assemblage 23 released a new single, "Binary", which debuted at No. 21 on the Billboard US singles chart, preceding the album Meta, released in April 2007.

Also in 2007 saw the release of Early Rare & Unreleased which is a collection of 14 Assemblage 23 tracks taken from the years 1988–1998. In 2009, "Early Rare & Unreleased Volume Two" was released.

Assemblage 23 performed at Montreal's Kinetik Festival in May 2009. In September 2009, Assemblage 23 released the single "Spark," followed by its sixth studio album Compass.

On June 12, 2012, Assemblage 23 released the album Bruise.

The album Endure was released on August 28, 2016, and, in October 2016, Assemblage 23 began a nationwide tour in support of the album.

Mourn, was released on September 11, 2020, and was influenced simultaneously by Shear's bout with depression after the release of Endure and the onset of the COVID-19 pandemic. Also owing to the pandemic, the release of Mourn was unique in that it was not immediately followed by a tour unlike each of the band's previous seven albums.

== Band members ==
- Tom Shear - vocals, programming
- Paul Seegers - keyboards
- Mike Jenney - drums

== Discography ==
=== Demo cassette ===
- Demo, Fall 1998 – (CS demo) 1998 – no label

=== Studio albums ===
- Contempt – (CD album) 1999 – Gashed! • (CD album) 2000 – Accession Records • (CD album) 2001 – Metropolis
- Failure – (CD album) 2001 – Gashed!, Metropolis, Accession Records
- Defiance – (CD album) 2002 – Metropolis, Accession Records • (CD album) 2005 – Irond
- Storm – (CD album) 2004 – Metropolis, Accession Records • (CD) 2005 – Irond
- Meta – (CD album) 2007 – Metropolis, Accession Records, Irond
- Compass – (CD album) Oct. 2009 – Metropolis, Accession Records, Irond
- Bruise – (CD album) June 2012 – Metropolis, Accession Records, Irond
- Endure – (CD album) 2016 – Metropolis
- Mourn - (CD album) 2020 - Metropolis
- Null - (CD, LP) 2025 - Metropolis

=== Remix albums, EPs ===
- Addendum – (CD) 2001 – Accession Records

=== Early, Rare, and Unreleased collections ===
- Early, Rare & Unreleased 1988–1998 – (CD, Ltd. Edition) 2007 – 23db
- Early, Rare & Unreleased: Volume Two – (CD, Ltd. Edition) 2009 – 23db

=== Singles ===
- "Disappoint" – (CD, Maxi) 2001 – Accession Records
- "Document" – (CD Maxi) 2002 – Accession Records
- "Let the Wind Erase Me" – (CD Maxi) 2004 – Metropolis, Accession Records
- "Ground"– (CD Maxi) 2004 – Metropolis, Accession Records
- "Binary" – (CD Maxi) 2007 – Metropolis, Accession Records
- "Spark" – (CD Maxi) Sept. 2009 – Metropolis, Accession Records

== See also ==
- Nerve Filter, a side project by Shear.
- Surveillance, a side project by Shear.
- Helix, a side project by Shear and Mari Kattman.
- Ed Flesh, a side project of Mike Jenney.
- Thy Fearful Symmetry, a side project of Paul Seegers.
