= Accession Records =

German independent record label

Accession Records is a German independent record label created by Adrian Hates the frontman of the band Diary Of Dreams in 1995 year. Have a division sub-label, Succession Records, who recorded some bands until 2010.

Early in its existence, only DoD albums were released on the label, but in 1999 contracts were signed with other bands. At the same time, connections were made with overseas partner labels, Canadian Scratched! and American Metropolis Records.

The names of the bands under contract are mainly known in the Gothic, darkwave, neo-folk, (new) wave, EBM and industrial.

Between 2001 and 2006 three sampler albums with hit singles or unreleased tracks of the label bands were released under the name "Various Artists Volume 1-3":

- Various Artists Volume 1 featuring Assemblage 23 – ‘Anthem (Stronghold)’, Diary of Dreams – ‘Bladerunner 2001 instrumental’, and Psyche – ‘Unbreakable’.
- Various Artists Volume 2 featuring SITD – ‘Locked in syndrome (Aphelion)’
- Various Artists Volume 3 featuring Faderhead – ‘Bassgod’

== Artists ==
During its existence, such bands as:

- Angels of Venice
- Assemblage 23
- Claire Voyant
- Cleaner (band) (Cleen, Clear Vision)
- Diary of Dreams
- Diorama (band)
- Distorted Reality
- Lights of Euphoria
- Nerve.Filter
- Panzer AG
- SITD
- Faderhead
- Build 23
- Haujobb
- Sinine
- Human Decay
- Painkillers
- Clear Vision
- Cyber axis
- .com/kill
- Coma Alliance
- Spektralized
- Painbastard
- Audioscope
- Belief
- Cut.Rate.Box
- Plastic
- Silence
- Psyche
- Slave Republic
