= Debris (disambiguation) =

Debris is rubble, wreckage, ruins, litter and discarded garbage/refuse/trash, scattered remains of something destroyed, etc.

Debris may also refer to:

- Road debris
- Glacial debris
  - Ice rafted debris
- Marine debris
- Space debris
- Woody debris (disambiguation)
- Demolition waste
- Foreign object debris
- Behind-armor debris

== Music ==
- Debris (Ayria album), 2003
- Debris (Sandwich album), 2015
- "Debris", a song by The Faces from A Nod Is As Good As a Wink... to a Blind Horse
- "Debris", a song by Linkin Park from LP Underground 12.0
- Debris Inc., doom metal/punk rock band from Chicago
- DJ Debris, a member of the Australian hip hop group Hilltop Hoods

== Other uses ==
- Roger De Bris, a character in Mel Brooks' 1968 movie, The Producers
- Debris (play), a 2001 play by Dennis Kelly
- Debris (TV series), a 2021 American television series on NBC
