= Hearts for Bullets =

Studio album by Ayria
- Released: September 12, 2008
- Genre: Electronic
- Length: 114:07
- Label: Alfa Matrix
- Producer: Sebastian Komor

Ayria chronology
The Gun Song (2008)	Hearts for Bullets (2008)	Plastic Makes Perfect (2013)

Limited Edition Cover

Hearts for Bullets is the third album by Jennifer Parkin's project Ayria, released in 2008 on the Alfa Matrix label. As with the previous albums, it was also released as a deluxe edition with a bonus disc, although this time, instead of remixes, it featured covers and material by other bands featuring Jennifer Parkin. The bonus disc was also released individually under the title Planet Parkin. The album art was designed by destroyx of Angelspit.

The album was produced by Sebastian Komor of Icon of Coil and Zombie Girl.

== Track listing ==
1. "Bad List" – 3:55
2. "Insect Calm" – 4:36
3. "The Gun Song" – 3:28
4. "Invisible" – 4:06
5. "Analog Trash" – 3:33
6. "1,000 Transmissions" – 5:38
7. "Suck It Up" – 4:11
8. "Blue Alice" – 4:07
9. "Hearts for Bullets" – 4:25
10. "Six Seconds" – 4:34
11. "My Poison" – 4:47
12. "Girl on the Floor" – 6:14

== Planet Parkin ==
1. "Winter Love Song" – 4:39
2. "Recoiled" (feat. EchoRausch) – 5:05
3. "Change" (Deftones cover) – 4:49
4. "Bad List" (Scratch Off Mix By V01d) – 5:59
5. "Invincible" (Pat Benatar cover) – 4:27
6. "Just Another Long Shot" (Glis Mix) – 5:42
7. "Rain" – 4:59
8. "Power Down" – 4:13
9. "Letting Go" (Classic Edit) – 5:42
10. "Liberty" – 4:34
11. "Hurting You Is Good for Me" – 4:41
12. "All I Want" – 4:55
- Songs #1–5 by Ayria
- Songs #6–8 by Epsilon Minus
- Song #9 by Glis
- Song #10 by Isis Signum
- Song #11 by Aïboforcen
- Song #12 by Implant
