= Epsilon Minus (album) =

Studio album by Epsilon Minus
- Released: 2002
- Genres: Electro-industrial, futurepop, trance
- Length: 68:43; 103:27 (Limited Edition)
- Label: Alfa Matrix

Epsilon Minus chronology
Epsilon Minus (2002)	Mark II (2003)

Limited Edition Cover

Epsilon Minus is the debut album by Epsilon Minus, released in 2002 on the Alfa Matrix label. It was also released as a deluxe edition with a bonus disc. The track "Power Down" was later released as a bonus track on the limited-edition version Hearts for Bullets, an album by Jennifer Parkin's solo project Ayria.

== Track listing ==
1. "Introduction (EM Anthem)" – 1:42
2. "Freedom" - 7:14
3. "Antigravity" - 4:07
4. "Transition (The Clock Is Ticking)" - 0:30
5. "Wasted Years" - 4:20
6. "Through" - 3:55
7. "Faceless Whispers" - 4:22
8. "Lost" - 4:48
9. "Protection" - 4:28
10. "Chiba City Blues" - 4:38
11. "Power Down" - 4:15
12. "Faceless Whispers (Hallucinate)" - 4:07
13. "Freedom (Restriction)" - 5:27
14. "Nothing Is Indestructible" - 6:42
15. "Untitled" - 6:48
16. "Untitled" - 0:47
17. "Untitled" - 0:33

== Bonus Disc ==
1. "Antigravity" (Implant Mix) - 5:15
2. "Through" (Glis Mix) - 5:24
3. "Faceless Whispers" (GASR Mix) - 4:43
4. "A Dark Background" - 3:51
5. "Freedom" (Stromkern Mix) - 6:43
6. "Nothing Is Indestructible" (Neikka RPM Mix) - 4:49
7. "Antigravity" (cXe) - 3:59
