= List of mammals of Luxembourg =

This list shows the IUCN Red List status of the 46 mammal species occurring in Luxembourg. Three of them are near threatened and most are least concern.

Icons which state each species' global IUCN status:
CR	Critically Endangered	In imminent risk of extinction in the wild
NT	Near Threatened	Doesn't meet any criteria that would categorise it as risking extinction but likely to in the future
LC	Least Concern	No current identifiable risks to this species

== Order: Rodentia (rodents) ==
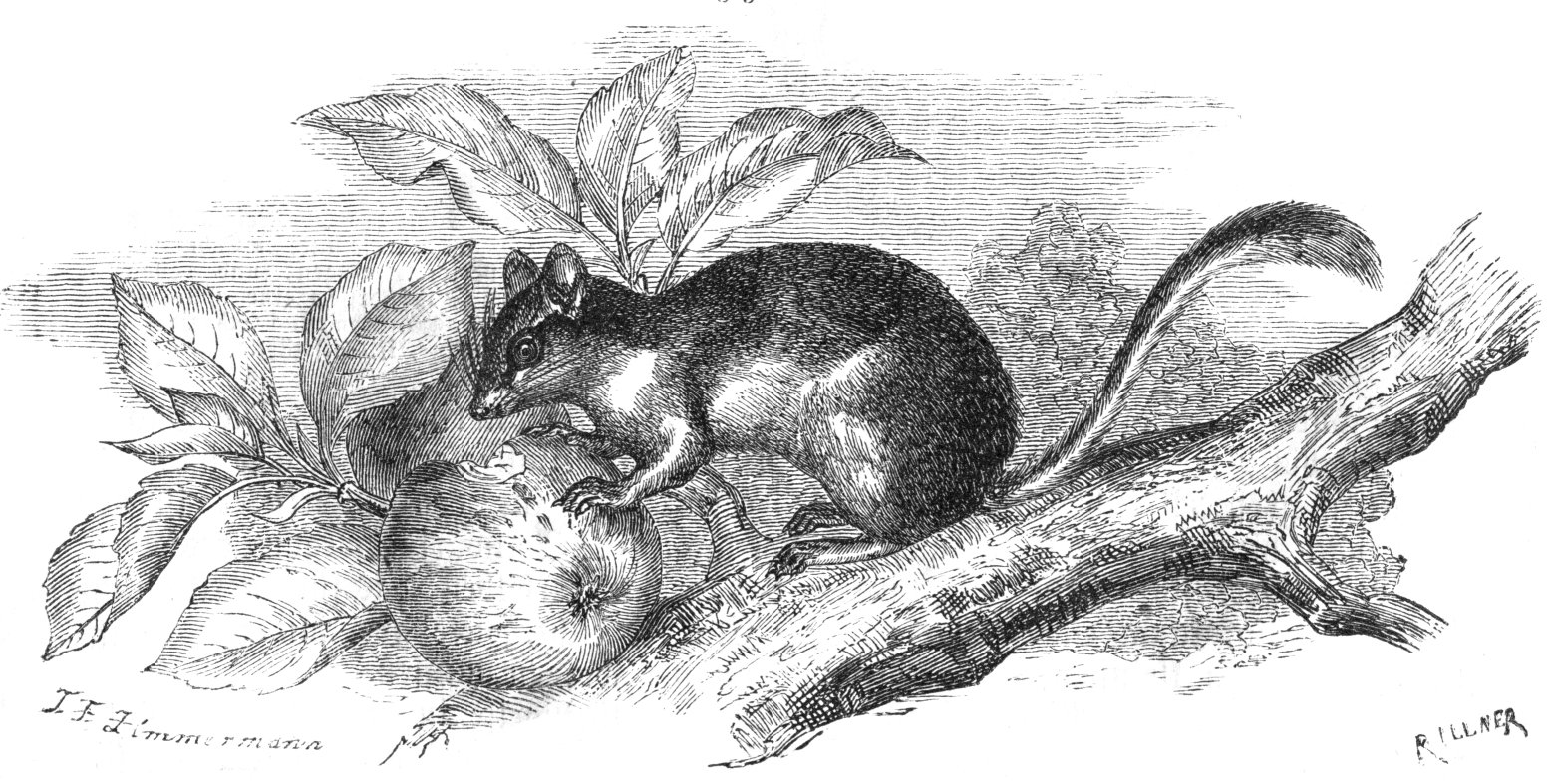
Garden dormouse

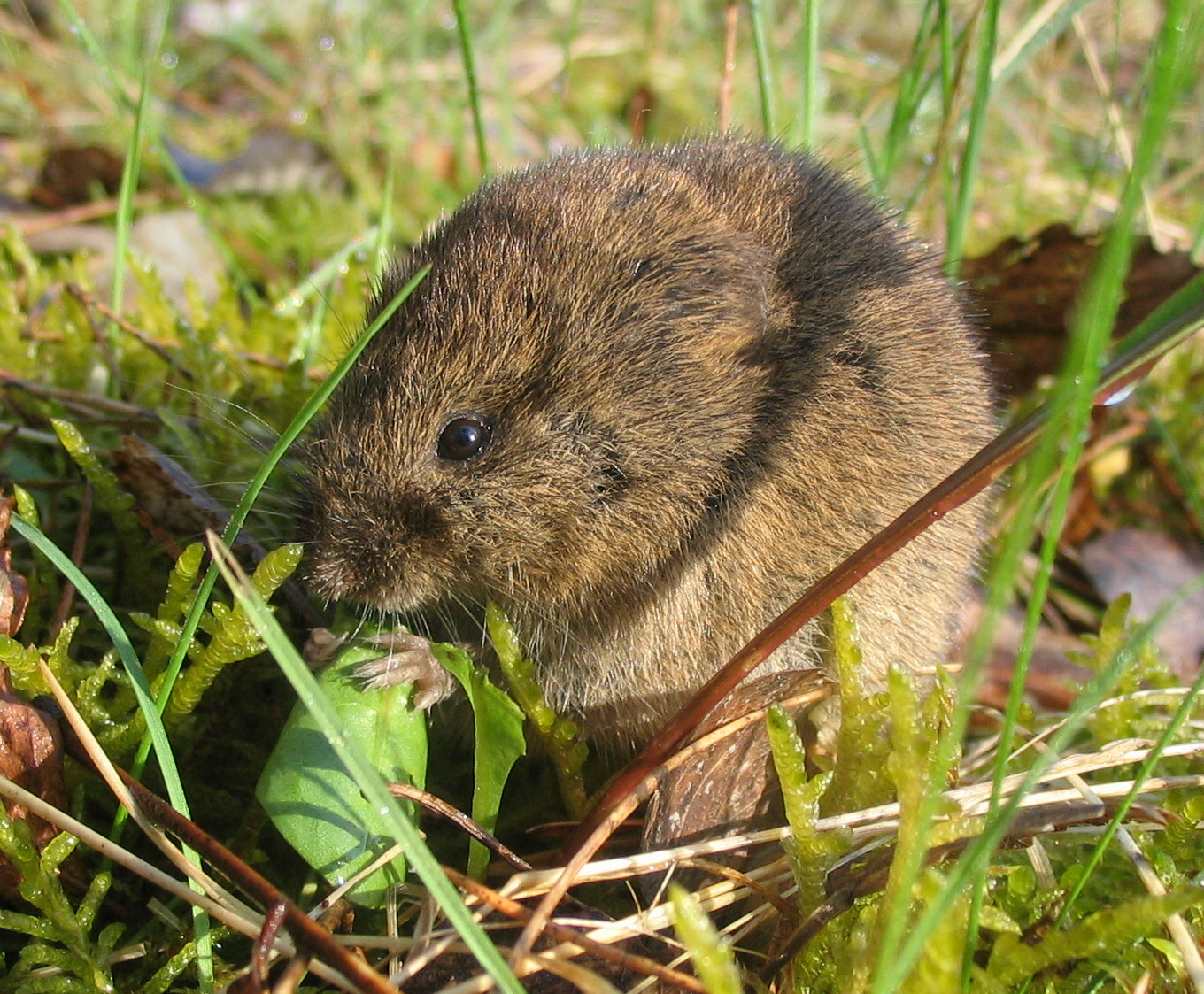
Common vole

Rodents make up the largest order of mammals, with over 40% of mammalian species. They have two incisors in the upper and lower jaw which grow continually and must be kept short by gnawing.

- Suborder: Sciuromorpha
  - Family: Sciuridae (squirrels)
    - Subfamily: Sciurinae
      - Tribe: Sciurini
        - Genus: Sciurus
          - Red squirrel, S. vulgaris LC
  - Family: Gliridae (dormice)
    - Subfamily: Leithiinae
      - Genus: Eliomys
        - Garden dormouse, E. quercinus NT
      - Genus: Muscardinus
        - Hazel dormouse, M. avellanarius LC
    - Subfamily: Glirinae
      - Genus: Glis
        - European edible dormouse, G. glis LC
- Suborder: Castorimorpha
  - Family: Castoridae (beavers)
    - Genus: Castor
      - American beaver, C. canadensis LC introduced
      - Eurasian beaver, C. fiber LC
- Suborder: Myomorpha
  - Family: Cricetidae
    - Subfamily: Cricetinae
      - Genus: Cricetus
        - European hamster, C. cricetus CR
    - Subfamily: Arvicolinae
      - Genus: Arvicola
        - European water vole, A. amphibius LC
      - Genus: Clethrionomys
        - Bank vole, C. glareolus LC
      - Genus: Microtus
        - Field vole, M. agrestis LC
        - Common vole, M. arvalis LC
        - European pine vole, M. subterraneus LC
      - Genus: Ondatra
        - Muskrat, O. zibethicus LC, introduced
  - Family: Muridae (mice, rats, voles, gerbils, hamsters, etc.)
    - Subfamily: Murinae
      - Genus: Apodemus
        - Yellow-necked mouse, A. flavicollis LC
        - Wood mouse, A. sylvaticus LC
      - Genus: Rattus
        - Brown rat, R. norvegicus LC, introduced
      - Genus: Mus
        - House mouse, M. musculus LC, introduced
      - Genus: Micromys
        - Eurasian harvest mouse, M. minutus LC
- Suborder: Hystricomorpha
  - Family: Echimyidae (spiny rats)
    - Genus: Myocastor
      - Nutria, M. coypus LC, introduced

== Order: Lagomorpha (lagomorphs) ==
The lagomorphs comprise two families, Leporidae (hares and rabbits), and Ochotonidae (pikas). Though they can resemble rodents, and were classified as a superfamily in that order until the early 20th century, they have since been considered a separate order. They differ from rodents in a number of physical characteristics, such as having four incisors in the upper jaw rather than two.

- Family: Leporidae (rabbits and hares)
  - Genus: Lepus
    - European hare, L. europaeus LC
  - Genus: Oryctolagus
    - European rabbit, O. cuniculus NT introduced

== Order: Eulipotyphla (hedgehogs, gymnures, shrews, moles, and solenodons) ==
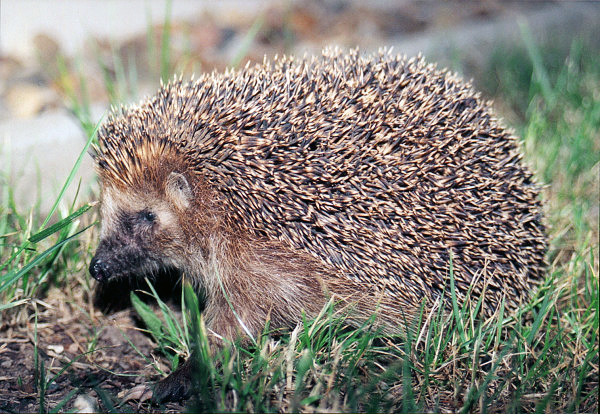
West European hedgehog

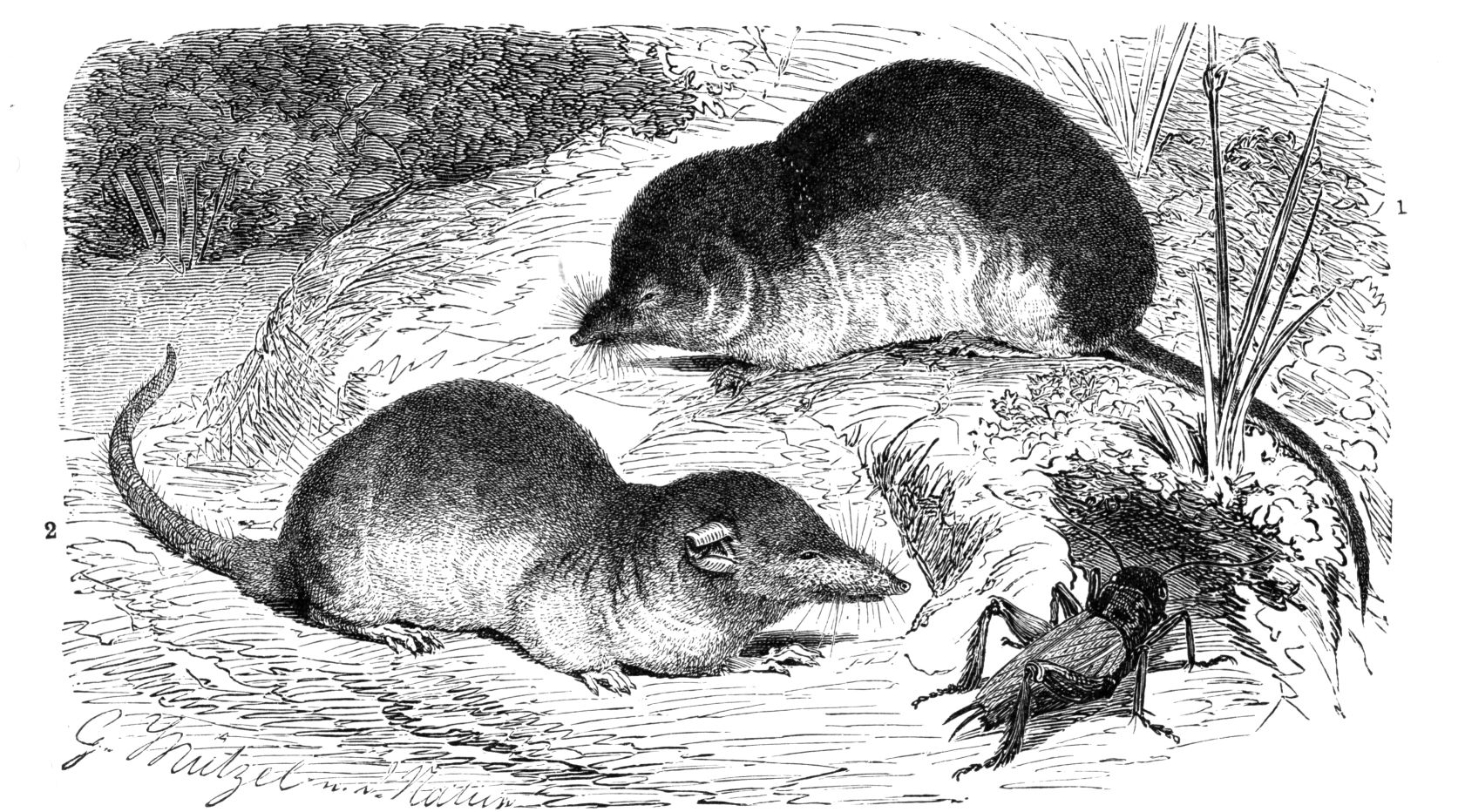
Common shrew

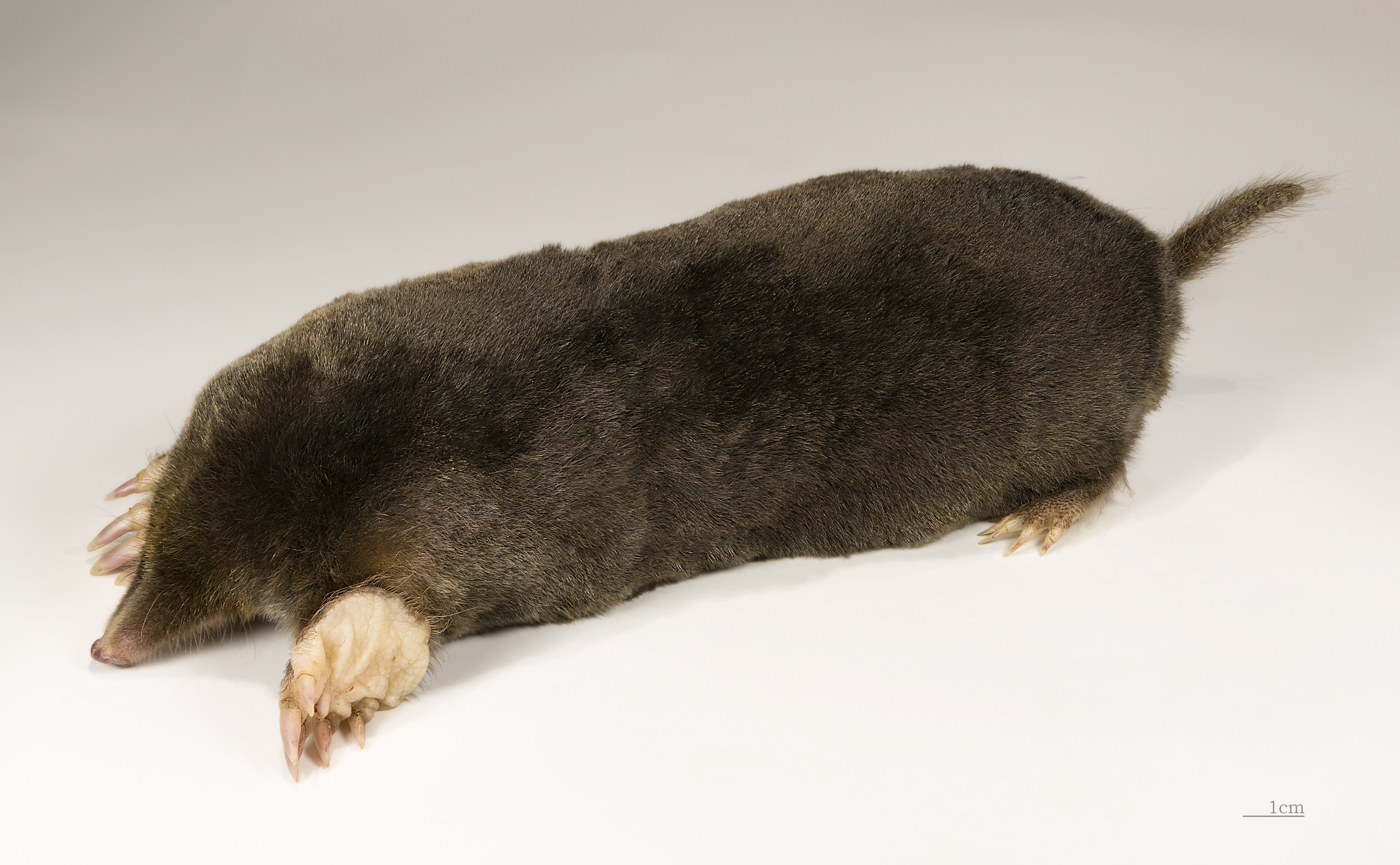
European mole

The order Eulipotyphla contains 4 extant families (Solenodontidae, Talpidae, Soricidae, and Erinaceidae). The hedgehogs are easily recognised by their spines while gymnures look more like large rats. The shrews and solenodons closely resemble mice while the moles are stout-bodied burrowers.

- Family: Erinaceidae (hedgehogs)
  - Subfamily: Erinaceinae
    - Genus: Erinaceus
      - West European hedgehog, E. europaeus LC
- Family: Talpidae (moles)
  - Genus: Talpa
    - European mole, T. europaea LC
- Family: Soricidae (shrews)
  - Subfamily: Soricinae
    - Genus: Sorex
      - Common shrew, S. araneus LC
      - Eurasian pygmy shrew, S. minutus LC
    - Genus: Neomys
      - Eurasian water shrew, N. fodiens LC
  - Subfamily: Crocidurinae
    - Genus: Crocidura
      - Greater white-toothed shrew, C. russula LC
      - Bicolored shrew, C. leucodon LC
      - Güldenstädt's shrew, C. gueldenstaedtii LC

== Order: Chiroptera (bats) ==
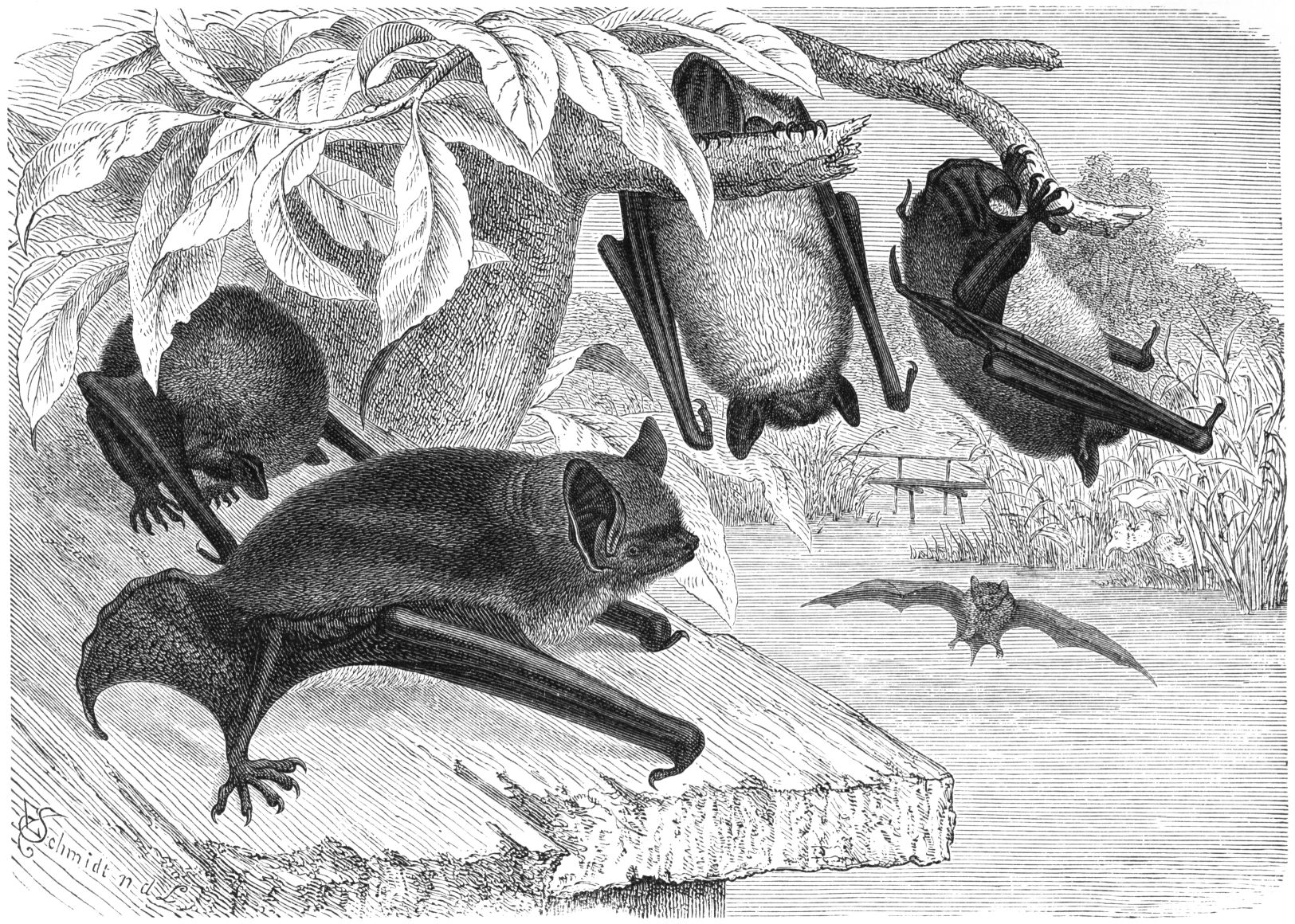
Daubenton's bat

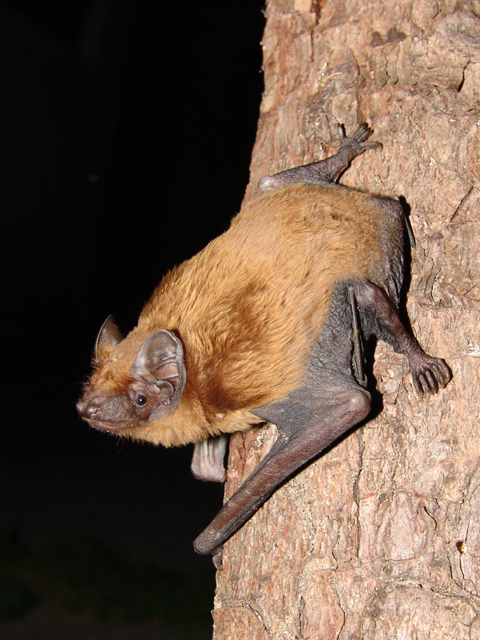
Common noctule

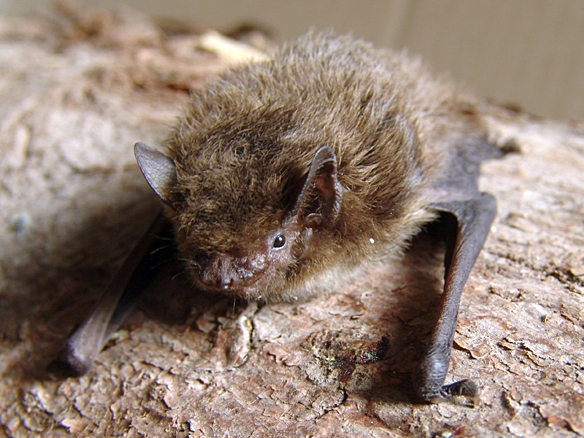
Nathusius' pipistrelle

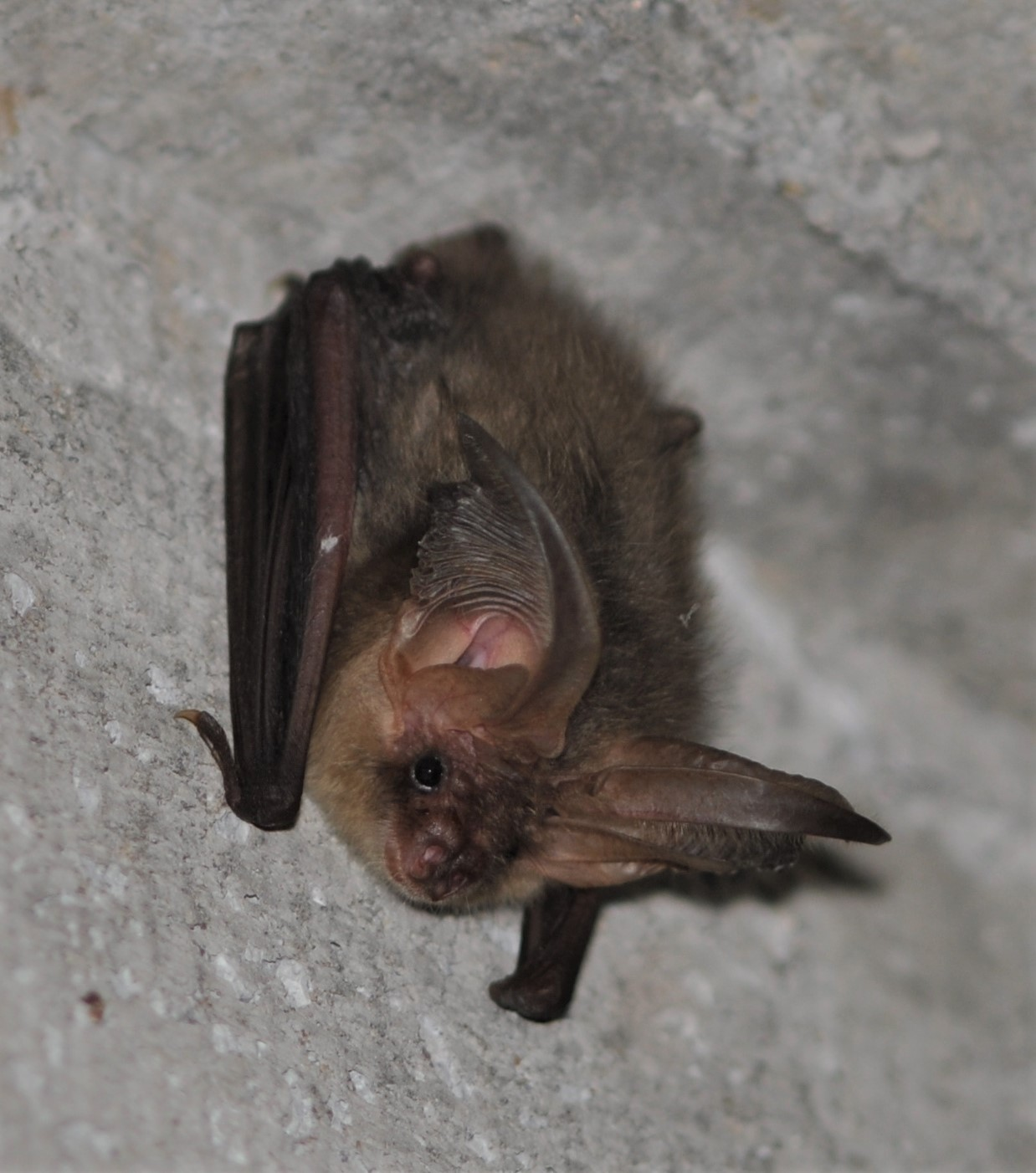
Brown long-eared bat

The bats' most distinguishing feature is that their forelimbs are developed as wings, making them the only mammals capable of flight. Bat species account for about 20% of all mammals.

- Family: Vespertilionidae
  - Genus: Vespertilio
    - Parti-coloured bat, V. murinus LC
  - Subfamily: Myotinae
    - Genus: Myotis
      - Bechstein's bat, M. bechsteinii NT
      - Brandt's bat, M. brandti LC
      - Pond bat, M. dasycneme NT
      - Daubenton's bat, M. daubentonii LC
      - Geoffroy's bat, M. emarginatus LC
      - Greater mouse-eared bat, M. myotis LC
      - Whiskered bat, M. mystacinus LC
      - Natterer's bat, M. nattereri LC
  - Subfamily: Vespertilioninae
    - Genus: Barbastella
      - Western barbastelle, B. barbastellus NT
    - Genus: Eptesicus
      - Serotine bat, E. serotinus LC
    - Genus: Nyctalus
      - Common noctule, N. noctula LC
      - Lesser noctule, N. leisleri LC
    - Genus: Pipistrellus
      - Nathusius' pipistrelle, P. nathusii LC
      - Common pipistrelle, P. pipistrellus LC
      - Soprano pipistrelle, P. pygmaeus LC
    - Genus: Plecotus
      - Brown long-eared bat, P. auritus LC
      - Grey long-eared bat, P. austriacus NT
- Family: Rhinolophidae
  - Subfamily: Rhinolophinae
    - Genus: Rhinolophus
      - Greater horseshoe bat, R. ferrumequinum LC
      - Lesser horseshoe bat, R. hipposideros LC

== Order: Carnivora (carnivorans) ==
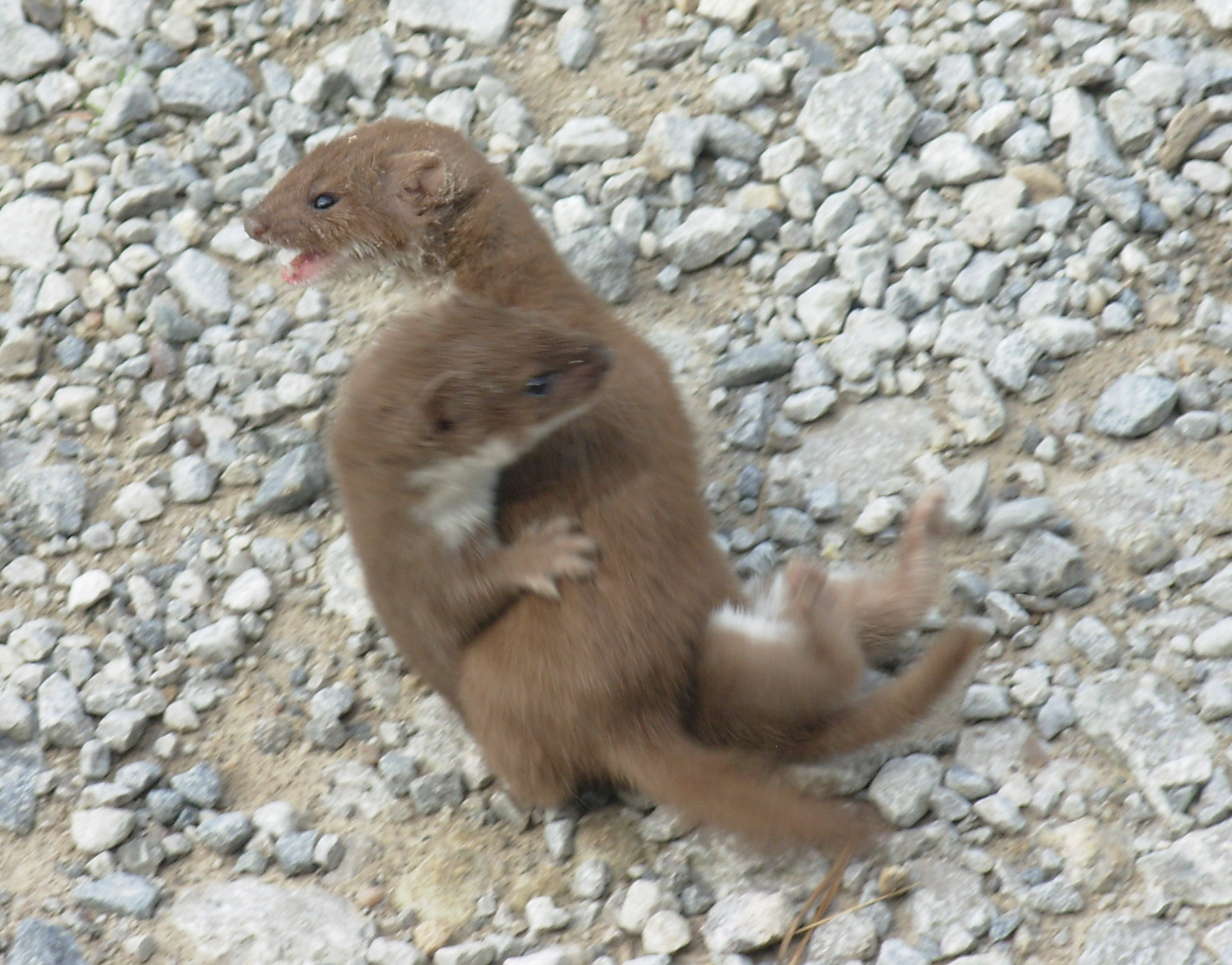
Least weasel

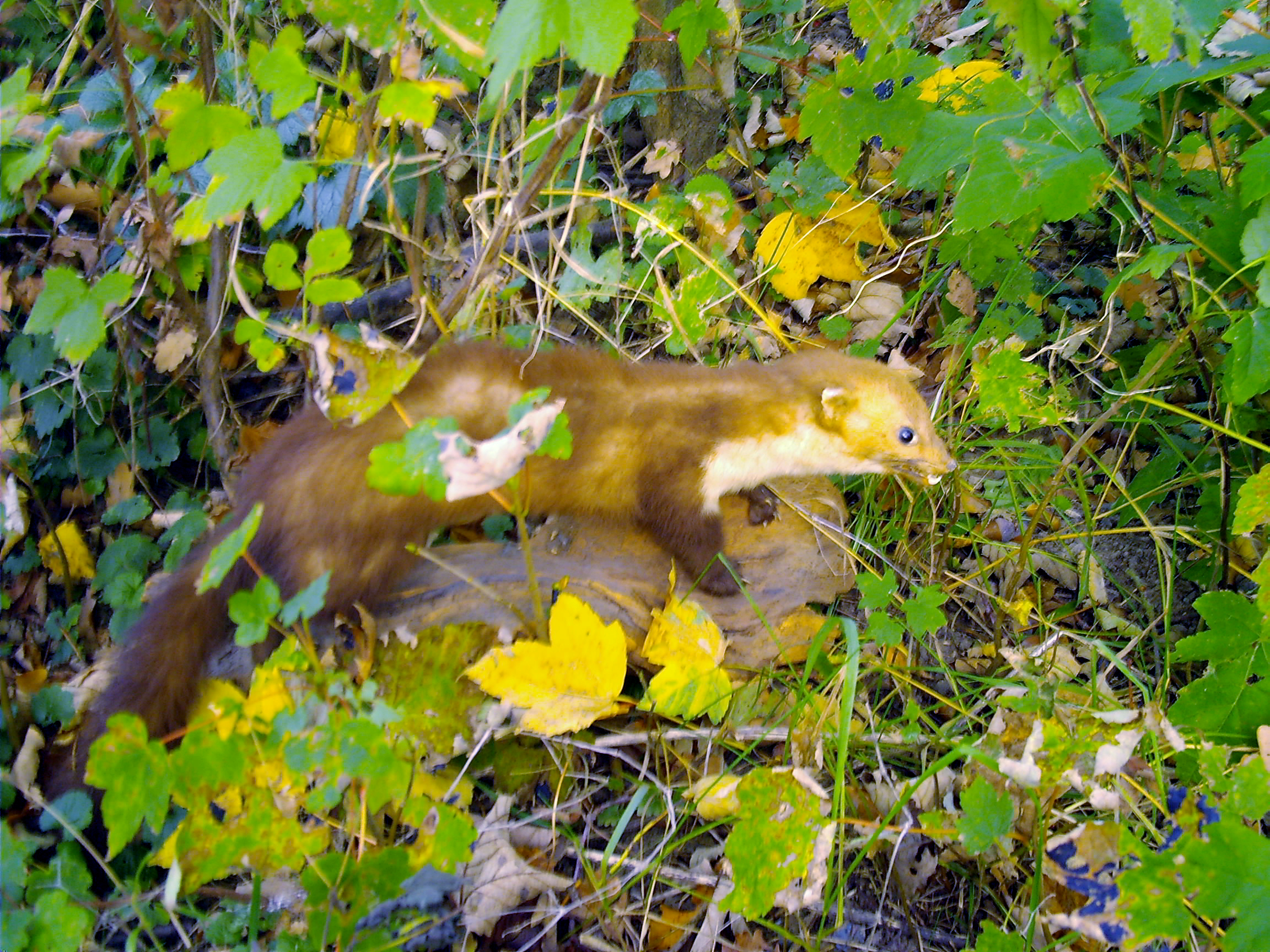
Beech marten

There are over 260 species of carnivorans, the majority of which feed primarily on meat. They have a characteristic skull shape and dentition.

- Suborder: Feliformia
  - Family: Felidae (cats)
    - Subfamily: Felinae
      - Genus: Felis
        - European wildcat, F. silvestris LC
      - Genus: Lynx
        - Eurasian lynx, L. lynx LC
- Suborder: Caniformia
  - Family: Canidae (dogs, foxes)
    - Genus: Canis
      - Gray wolf, C. lupus LC
        - Eurasian wolf, C. l. lupus
    - Genus: Vulpes
      - Red fox, V. vulpes LC
  - Family: Mustelidae (mustelids)
    - Genus: Lutra
      - European otter, L. lutra NT
    - Genus: Martes
      - European pine marten, M. martes LC
      - Beech marten, M. foina LC
    - Genus: Meles
      - European badger, M. meles LC
    - Genus: Mustela
      - Stoat, M. erminea LC
      - Least weasel, M. nivalis LC
      - European polecat, M. putorius LC
    - Genus: Neogale
      - American mink, N. vison LC presence uncertain, introduced
  - Family: Procyonidae (raccoons, coatis, cacomistles, ringtails)
    - Genus: Procyon
      - Northern raccoon, P. lotor LC, introduced

== Order: Artiodactyla (even-toed ungulates) ==
The even-toed ungulates are ungulates whose weight is borne about equally by the third and fourth toes, rather than mostly or entirely by the third as in perissodactyls. There are about 220 artiodactyl species, including many that are of great economic importance to humans.

- Family: Cervidae (deer)
  - Subfamily: Cervinae
    - Genus: Cervus
      - Red deer, C. elaphus LC
        - Central European red deer, C. e. hippelaphus
    - Genus: Dama
      - European fallow deer, D. dama LC introduced
  - Subfamily: Capreolinae
    - Genus: Capreolus
      - Roe deer, C. capreolus LC
- Family: Suidae (pigs)
  - Subfamily: Suinae
    - Genus: Sus
      - Wild boar, S. scrofa LC
        - Central European boar, S. s. scrofa

== Locally extinct ==
The following species are locally extinct in the country:

- Brown bear, Ursus arctos
- European bison, Bison bonasus

== See also ==
- List of chordate orders
- Lists of mammals by region
- List of prehistoric mammals
- Mammal classification
- List of mammals described in the 2000s
