= The Gun Song (EP) =

EP by Ayria
- Released: March 2008
- Genre: Electro-industrial, futurepop
- Length: 49:11
- Label: Alfa Matrix
- Producer: Sebastian Komor

Ayria chronology
Flicker (2005)	The Gun Song (2008)	Hearts for Bullets (2008)

The Gun Song is the fourth album and second EP by Jennifer Parkin's project Ayria, released in 2008 on the Alfa Matrix label.

== Track listing ==
1. "The Gun Song" – 3:28
2. "Six Seconds" – 4:36
3. "The Gun Song (Killing Me Softly Mix by Daniel B - Front 242)" – 4:37
4. "The Gun Song (Angelspit Mix)" – 4:38
5. "Six Seconds (Spetsnaz Mix)" – 4:02
6. "The Gun Song (Essence of Mind Mix)" – 4:41
7. "The Gun Song (Leæther Strip Mix)" – 7:08
8. "Six Seconds (David Carretta Mix)" – 5:58
9. "The Gun Song (Headscan Mix)" – 4:43
10. "Six Seconds (Standeg Mix)" – 5:20
