= Sebastian Komor =

Polish-Norwegian electronic musician

Sebastian R. Komor
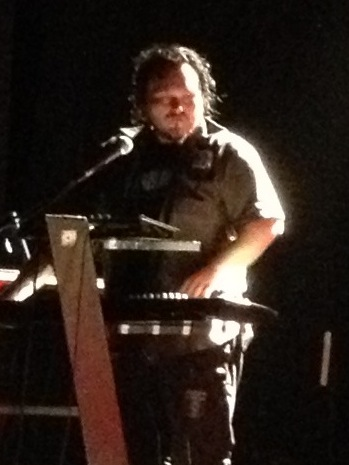

Background information
- Also known as: Komor Kommando, Squarehead, Moonitor, Melt
- Born: 7 May 1976 (age 50); Zabrze, Poland
- Genres: Electronic, EBM
- Occupation: Musician
- Instruments: Keyboards, drum programming, effects
- Years active: 1997–present
- Labels: Metropolis Records; Alfa Matrix; Out of Line Music; Infacted Recordings; Synthetic Entertainment; FiXT; Position Music; Rasputin Recordings

Sebastian R. Komor (born 7 May 1976) is a Polish-born, Norwegian-raised electronic musician, best known for his collaborative work in Icon of Coil and Zombie Girl. A prolific artist, Komor has also released electronic music under a variety of solo projects and aliases since the late 1990s.

== Biography ==
Sebastian Komor was born in Zabrze, Poland, in 1976 and moved to Norway in 1981, where he would remain for over twenty years. He first acquired a keyboard in his late teens and released his first music demo in 1992. Throughout the mid-to late-90s, Komor created music in Fredrikstad, where an EBM/industrial scene was flourishing under the influence of local bands such as Apoptygma Berzerk. Komor recorded and toured under various band names during that time, starting with Melt and continuing with Area51, Sector9 (which he also used as a remixer alias), and Moonitor. Fellow Fredrikstad musician Andy LaPlegua played keyboards for early Sector9 and Melt shows, and it was this collaboration that led to the formation of Icon of Coil in 1997, with the roles reversed – LaPlegua as primary creative member and Komor came in as a full member during the production of the first single "Shallow Nation". Icon of Coil released their debut single, Shallow Nation, in 2000, at which point Komor became a full-fledged member of the band. Komor and LaPlegua went on to release three full-length albums as IoC: Serenity Is the Devil (2000), The Soul is in the Software (2002), and Machines Are Us (2004). Icon of Coil garnered a fair amount of popularity within the scene, having their albums distributed worldwide and playing a variety of large festivals. During this same time period, Komor and Richard Bjørklund formed the synthpop/EBM band Monofader and released the album Frost in 2004. Sebastian also did drum, sampling and synth programming on an EP titled Fenris for an industrial black metal band called Helheim (note: not the Norwegian black/Viking metal band Helheim).

In 2004, Komor relocated to Edmonton, Alberta, Canada. Activity within Icon of Coil during this time started slowing down as Andy focused more on his project Combichrist.

In 2005 Komor started Zombie Girl with Renee Cooper. Komor initiated the project, the name, the logo, the overall look and design. As well as writing, producing, mixing and writing the lyrics. They released an EP in 2006 and a full album in 2007 through Alfa Matrix and Metropolis. Komor was also signed to electronic rock label FiXT in 2008 for his solo hard techno/trance/industrial project Squarehead. Two advance Squarehead singles featuring guest vocals were released in 2008 and 2009 with a full-length album, Voltage Controlled Body Music, released in March 2010. Sebastian's long time work-in-progress Moonitor, which he describes as techno/tribal, has now also been signed to FiXT and released an album titled To the Past From the Future in the Present. It appears that both Squarehead and Moonitor were one-off projects with no additional albums currently planned, as Komor has stated that he is now fully focused on another of his oldest projects, Melt. Komor has released production music geared towards film, television, and video game soundtracks through FiXT's sister company Position Music. Yet another active side project of Seb's is Komor Kommando, his dark techno/EBM/aggrotech club-oriented DJ alias. One EP has thus far been released on Alfa Matrix, with a full-length album imminent. Additional solo work has been released through Rasputin Records under his real name.

The aforementioned Melt, now rejuvenated after years of being kept on hold by commitments to Icon of Coil, was initially to see an EP called Parasites released in early 2009, but is still a work in progress, with Seb stating "I just dont want to hurry a release, this is a very personal album, and I just feel it needs to feel right and complete before its ready to be unleashed". Though the name has carried over from work done as early as 1994, all of the current songs being worked on are brand new.

Sebastian does production work as Xenomorph Productions. He produced the album Hearts for Bullets by Ayria in 2008. Komor mastered the Depeche Mode tribute album Alfa Matrix Re:Covered in 2009, which included two covers by Komor Kommando. That same year he also mastered fellow Canadian electro-industrial act iVardensphere's debut album Scatterface. In February 2010 Komor released a collection of over 400 audio samples from his studio, some from his released projects and some unused. A second volume followed in June of that same year.

Komor is also a visual artist, and designs the artwork for his own releases.

== Discography ==
=== as Sebastian Komor ===
- Elephant/Buzzr single RASP004 (Rasputin Recordings 2007)
- "Electro Body Music" on Fuck the Mainstream Volume 1 compilation (Alfa Matrix 2007) (reappears on the debut Squarehead album)
- "Das Oontz" on the Endzeit Bunkertracks: Act III Damage Session, (Alfa Matrix 2008)
- Production Music Series Vol. 32 – Electronic (2008 Position Music) – 4 tracks
- Production Music Series Vol. 39 – Electronic (2008 Position Music) – all 22 tracks
- From the Vault Vol. 1: Industrial – Crunchy Beats and FX Noisy Synths and Bizarre Ambiance (2010 Xenomorph Productions)
- The Voyage Vol. 1 (2011 FiXT)
- The Voyage Vol. 2 (2013 Subterra Records)
- The Voyage Vol. 3 (2013 Subterra Records)
- The Voyage Vol. 4 (2013 Subterra Records)
- Vikings, Thrones & Dragonbones (Alfa Matrix, 15 August 2014)
- The Voyage Vol. 5 (2015 Subterra Records)
- Invisible Cities Vol. 1 (2015 Subterra Records)
- Machines of Destruction (2015 Subterra Records)
- Chasing Stars Vol. 1 (2015 Subterra Records)
- The Voyage Vol. 6 (2015 Subterra Records)
- The Voyage Vol. 7 (2016 Subterra Records)
- Chasing Stars Vol. 2 (2016 Subterra Records)
- The Voyage Vol. 8 (2017 Subterra Records)
- The Voyage Vol. 9 (2017 Subterra Records)
- Invisible Cities Vol. 2 (2017 Subterra Records)
- "Bass Machine", "Taurus", and "Lion" on Tenacity compilation album (2017 FiXT/Subterra/Position)
- The Voyage Vol. 10 (2018 Subterra Records)
- Cyber Lions (2023 single - Xenomorph Productions)
- The Sound of Dystopia (2023 single - Xenomorph Productions)
- Electrodrive - Trailer Music album (7 songs Written and Produced) (X-It Music - February 2019)
- Haunted Grounds - Trailer Music album (1 song Written and Produced) (X-It Music - September 2018)

=== as Komor Kommando ===
- Das EP (Alfa Matrix 2009)
- "John the Revelator (feat. JL De Meyer of Front 242)" and "Personal Jesus" on Alfa Matrix Re:Covered – A Tribute to Depeche Mode (Alfa Matrix 2009)
- Oil-Steel & Rhythm (Alfa Matrix 2011)
- "Boomtscheekah – Remix EP" (Alfa Matrix/ acidallstars 2012) feat. remixes by DJ Pierre, bathsh3ba, A23P, and Marc Fleury under his alias "Ninja"
- Hail The Rhythm EP (Alfa Matrix 2016)
- One By One EP (Alfa Matrix 2022)

=== with Icon of Coil ===
- Shallow Nation (MCD) (2000)
- One Nation Under Beat (MCD) (2000)
- Serenity Is the Devil (2000)
- Seren EP (2001)
- Access and Amplify (MCD) (2002)
- The Soul Is in the Software (2002)
- Android (MCD) (2003)
- Machines Are Us (2004)
- Machines Are Us (2CD) Limited edition (2004)
- Uploaded and Remixed (2004)
- Uploaded and Remixed / Shelter Ep (2CD) Limited edition (2004)
- I-II-III (2006)

=== with Monofader ===
- Frost (2004 Infacted Recordings)

=== as Squarehead ===
- Rockin' (featuring Zombie Girl) single (2008 FiXT)
- Stop, Drop & Roll (featuring XINA) single (2008 FiXT)
- Stop, Drop & Roll remix EP (2009 FiXT)
- Voltage Controlled Body Music (2010 FiXT)

=== with Helheim (The Helheim Society) ===
- Fenris (MCD) (1996) (samples, keyboards and drum programming)

=== as Moonitor ===
- To the Past From the Future in the Present - Album (2010 FiXT)

=== as Melt ===
- Emissions of Hypocrisy (2011 Metropolis Records)

=== with Zombie Girl ===
- Back From the Dead (2006 Alfa Matrix/Metropolis Records)
- Blood, Brains & Rock 'n' Roll (2007 Alfa Matrix/Metropolis Records)
- The Halloween EP (2009)

=== as a Producer - Mixing engineer - Programming ===
- Alphaville - Catching Rays on Giant Album (Co-production, programming) (Universal/WeLoveMusic - November 2010)
- Alphaville - Strange Attractor Album (Co-production, programming) (Universal/WeLoveMusic - April 2017)
- Ayria - Hearts for Bullets Album (Mixing, production and Mastering) (Alfa Matrix 2008)
- Ayria - Plastic Makes Perfect Album (Mixing, production and Mastering) (Alfa Matrix 2013)
- Ayria - Paper Dolls Album (Mixing, production and Mastering) (Alfa Matrix 2016)
- Ayria - This Is My Battle Cry Album (Mixing, production and Mastering) (ArtOfFact Records 2022)
- for all the emptiness - mt ep EP (Mixing, production and Mastering) (February 2027)
- for all the emptiness - mt repeat Remix EP (Remix and Mastering) (October 2017)
- for all the emptiness - circus of gods Album (Mixing, production and Mastering) (July 2018)
- for all the emptiness - taking back control Remix EP (Remix and Mastering) (March 2021)
- for all the emptiness - used and violated EP (Mixing, production and Mastering) (November 2022)
- for all the emptiness - dead inside EP (Mixing, production and Mastering) (July 2023)
- Spektralized - Elements of Truth Album (Mixing, production and Mastering) (April 2003)
- Raizer - We Are The Future Album (Mixing, additional programming) (FiXT Music - January 2017)
- Circle Of Dust - Machines of Our Disgrace (Additional programming) (FiXT Music - December 2016)
- The True Union - Love Me Now (Not) EP (Co-Production and programming) (Alfa Matrix - December 2022)
