= Monofader =

Norwegian future pop duo

- Also known as: Off:Tribe
- Origin: Norway
- Genres: EBM; Synthpop
- Years active: 2001–present
- Labels: Infacted, Metropolis
- Members: Richard Bjørklund; Sebastian Komor

Monofader is a future pop/synthpop duo from Norway, fronted by Richard Bjørklund (from the band Spektralized), and Sebastian Komor (from the band Icon of Coil). Their music has been described as a cross between Depeche Mode and Erasure.

== History ==
In 2001, Bjørklund and Komor began working on a collaboration, that would eventually become the song "Solid Ground (v.2.0)". Calling themselves Off:Tribe, "Solid Ground (v.2.0)" was included on Tatra Record's 2002 compilation album, Serial Killer Electronics. Soon after, they released a six-song demo, and it was sent it to several labels, radio stations and DJs, where it received positive feedback from listeners. However, due to obligations to their respective bands, they could not finish their first album for another two years.

In December 2003, while he was in Germany with his band Spektralized, Bjørklund gave a copy of their demo to Infacted Recordings and ended up getting signed to the label. The duo immediately began work on their first album, which would be Frost. Frost was released by Infacted in Europe and Metropolis in the US in 2004, after which Komor moved to Canada and work on additional Monofader material slowed to a crawl. As of 2008, Komor stated that newer material existed, with a speculative album title of Everything Changes but the Sea, but that the project was not a priority.

== Frost ==
Frost

Studio album by Monofader
- Released: 18 May 2004
- Recorded: February 2003 – April 2004
- Genre: Electronica; Synthpop; EBM
- Label: Infacted, Metropolis
- Producer: Monofader

Professional ratings
Review scores
Source	Rating
Allmusic	3/5 stars
Sideline	5/6 stars

The band's debut album Frost, was released on 18 May 2004 through Infacted Recordings for Europe, Metropolis Records for the United States, and on Art Music Group for Russia.

=== Track listing ===
All tracks are written by Monofader.

No.	Title	Length
1.	"System Check (introduction)"	0:41
2.	"Mimic"	4:47
3.	"Deliver"	4:48
4.	"Cold and Awake"	4:13
5.	"Scars"	5:09
6.	"Stand Alone"	3:51
7.	"Why?"	4:33
8.	"Tonight We Are"	3:48
9.	"Behind"	4:30
10.	"Failure"	4:37
11.	"Pointless Memories"	5:26
12.	"Solid Ground (v.2.0)"	4:48
13.	"3am in Fredrikstad (Late Night Session)"	8:26
Total length:		54:20
