= Behind-armor debris =

Behind-armor debris is debris particles eroded from the penetrator of armor as well as spalled material ejected from the target itself.

Behind-armor debris characteristics can be described by the number, position, and size range of debris particles.
