= Epsilon Minus =

Canadian EBM/techno/trance band

- Origin: Toronto, Ontario, Canada
- Genres: Electronic dance, trance
- Years active: 2000–2005
- Label: Alfa Matrix
- Past members: Bogart Shwadchuck; Jennifer Parkin
- Website: www.epsilonminus.com

Epsilon Minus were a Canadian EBM/techno/trance band formed in 2000 by Bogart Shwadchuck and Jennifer Parkin. The name "Epsilon Minus" is a reference to Aldous Huxley's novel Brave New World.

== History ==
Epsilon Minus was started in 2000 by the duo of Bogart Shwadchuck and Jennifer Parkin. They released their self-titled debut album, Epsilon Minus, with Parkin on vocals, in May 2002 on Belgian record label Alfa Matrix. They followed in April 2003 with an electronic dance album titled Mark II. Parkin left the band during the making of Mark II to form Ayria and released Debris on Alfa Matrix. In an interview with Side-Line, Shwadchuck stated:

Jenn and I just didn't belong together. I grew out of the kind of music we were making, and there wasn't room for a partner in the things I wanted to be doing. ... In the end, we were only stopping each other from doing what we wanted to be doing, and there was no reason to continue working that way.

— Bogart Shwadchuck, Side-Line (47), 6 May 2004

Shwadchuck continued Epsilon Minus as a solo act, releasing the Pre-Initialized EP and the Reinitialized LP, exhibiting greater psychedelic trance and intelligence dance influences, in 2004. Reinitialized featured collaborations with Kristy Venrick (The Azoic), Martha M. Arce (Distorted Reality), Eric Oehler (Null Device), and Ned Kirby (Stromkern). Shwadchuck ended the project in 2005, releasing the short R.I.P. EP of leftovers and outtakes, and continued to record under his own name, as well as under the aliases "Artifice," "Sex Genius," and "Chester Fantastico." He briefly resurrected Epsilon Minus to perform a remix for The Gothsicles.

== Discography ==
- Epsilon Minus (Alfa Matrix, 2002)
- Mark II (Alfa Matrix, 2003)
- Pre-Initialized (Alfa Matrix, 2004)
- Reinitialized (Alfa Matrix, 2004)
- 20 EP (Self-released, 2022)
