= My Revenge on the World =

EP by Ayria
- Released: June 6, 2005
- Genre: Electro-industrial, futurepop
- Length: 54:17
- Label: Alfa Matrix
- Producer: Jennifer Parkin, Joe Byer

Ayria chronology
Debris (2003)	My Revenge on the World (2005)	Flicker (2005)

My Revenge on the World is the first EP by Jennifer Parkin's project Ayria, released in 2005 on the Alfa Matrix label.

== Track listing ==
1. "My Revenge on the World" – 5:21
2. "Infiltrating My Way Through the System" – 5:29
3. "Cutting (Cycletribe Mix)" – 5:15
4. "My Revenge on the World (Jamie Kidd Mix)" – 6:53
5. "Infiltrating My Way Through the System (November Process Mix)" – 4:48
6. "Cutting (PTIncision Mix)" – 6:19
7. "My Device (8kHzMono Miix)" – 3:56
8. "My Revenge on the World (Fractured Mix)" – 5:06
9. "Infiltrating My Way Through the System (Steril Mix)" – 6:23
10. "Cutting (Daniel X Mix)" – 4:47
