= Ayria =

Canadian futurepop/synthpop project

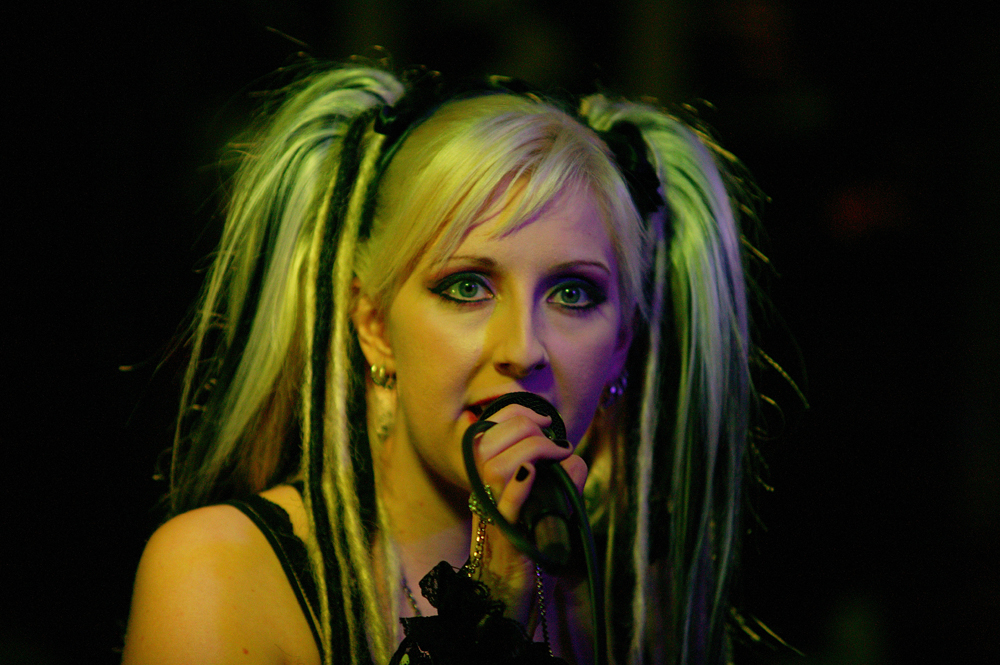
- Jennifer Parkin of Ayria

Background information
- Origin: Toronto, Ontario, Canada
- Genres: Futurepop; synth-pop; electropop; electro-industrial; electroclash
- Years active: 2003–present
- Label: Alfa Matrix • Artoffact
- Members: Jennifer Parkin
- Website: ayria.com

Ayria is a Canadian futurepop/synthpop musical project formed in early 2003 by Toronto's Jennifer Parkin following her departure from the futurepop and EBM band Epsilon Minus.

== Biography ==
The first Ayria album, Debris, was released on Alfa Matrix in November 2003.

During this period, Parkin performed guest vocals for several other projects, including Belgium's Aïboforcen and Implant, and Mexico's Isis Signum, some of which she would return to later on, such as the late 2011 release of two songs with Aïboforcen.

In late 2005, touring for Flicker commenced with several Canadian dates, a UK Festival (Interzone in Cardiff, the first European performance by Ayria), and a U.S. West Coast tour. 2006 saw many more opportunities for Ayria such as a first ever European tour in November as well as a debut performance in Osaka, Japan. As of 2008, Ayria was continuing a full United States tour as the supporting act for The Crüxshadows. She has played successful shows at DragonCon, alongside figures such as Sir Patrick Stewart, most recently in 2011, and has also performed with the seminal EBM/synthpop band VNV Nation.

The first two songs by Ayria since the release of Flicker included "The Gun Song", featured on the compilation Alfa Matrix - Re:connected [2.0], released in August 2006 and "Six Seconds On All Sides" released on Dancing Ferret's Asleep By Dawn compilation in fall of 2006. The third full-length album, Hearts For Bullets, was released on September 12, 2008, featuring these two songs.

All of her albums have thus far come with double CD versions available that feature a collection of remixed tracks and other inclusions such as side projects and covers.

Ayria's fourth full-length album, Plastic Makes Perfect, released May 24, 2013, during their North American tour with Project Pitchfork.

On April 22, 2016, she released a fifth full-length, titled Paper Dolls. It came in both a single CD, a two disc deluxe version and as a strictly limited pink vinyl. The second CD is a spiritual sequel to the bonus disc Planet Parkin that came with her third album Hearts for Bullets, titled The Heartless Kingdom.

Her sixth album, This Is My Battle Cry, was released in August 2022.

== Touring members ==
Ayria has performed with various band members for her live performances, which have included Mike Wimer of VNV Nation, Eric Gottesman, Shaun Frandsen, Joe Byer (v01d), Cam Eleon, Justin Pogue, and Kevin Toole. For her North American tour with Project Pitchfork in 2013, Sarah Wimer joined the live group; whereas in 2014, the live formation was completed by Michael Linke, who since then has played the keys beside of Sarah Wimer on various European shows of Ayria.

== Discography ==
=== Albums ===
- Debris (Alfa Matrix, November 2003)
- Flicker (Alfa Matrix, October 2005)
- Hearts for Bullets (Alfa Matrix, September 2008)
- Plastic Makes Perfect (Alfa Matrix, May 2013)
- Paper Dolls (Alfa Matrix, April 2016)
- This Is My Battle Cry (Artoffact Records, August 2022)
- 13 Stitches (Artoffact Records, October 2026)

=== EPs ===
- My Revenge on the World (Alfa Matrix, June 2005)
- The Gun Song (Alfa Matrix, March 2008)
- Plastic and Broken EP (Alfa Matrix, February 2013)
- Vicious World (Artoffact Records, May 2026)

=== Compilation albums ===
- Cyberl@b 4.0 (Alfa Matrix, 2003)
- square matrix 004 (Alfa Matrix, 2004)
- ADVANCED CLUB 0.1
- Re:connected [1.0] (Alfa Matrix, 2004)
- United Vol.I (NoiTekk, 2005)
- Endzeit Bunkertracks: Act I (Alfa Matrix, 2005)
- Cyberl@b 5.0 (Alfa Matrix, 2005)
- Re:connected [2.0] (Alfa Matrix, 2006)
- Fxxk the Mainstream [vol.1] (Alfa Matrix, 2007)
- Endzeit Bunkertracks: Act III (Alfa Matrix, 2007)
- Depeche Mode Tribute Alfa-Matrix Re:Covered (Alfa Matrix, 2009)

=== Guest appearances ===
- track Fuck Things Up on Audio Blender by Implant (Alfa Matrix, 2006)
- track Into the Game on Eclectric by Psy'Aviah (Alfa Matrix, 2010)
- track Give It to You by Corporate Soldiers (2010)
- track Letting Go on Balance by Glis (Alfa Matrix, 2003)
- track Mechvirus on Mechvirus (Remix) by Front Line Assembly (Artoffact Records, 2023)
- track Dream Chaser on Gateway to Oblivion by Glis (Alfa Matrix, 2024)
