= Woody debris =

Woody debris may refer to:

- Slash (logging), coarse and fine woody debris generated during logging operations or through natural forest disturbances
- Coarse woody debris, fallen dead trees and the remains of large branches on the ground in forests
- Large woody debris, logs, branches, and other wood that falls into streams and rivers
  - Log jam, an accumulation of large woody debris that can span an entire stream or river channel

== See also ==
- Dead wood (disambiguation)
- Debris
