= I-II-III (Icon of Coil albums) =

Compilation album by Icon of Coil
- Released: May 5, 2006
- Length: I: 73:48, II: 78:18, III: 73:45
- Label: Out of Line

Icon of Coil chronology
Uploaded And Remixed (2004)	I-II-III (2006)

I-II-III are three compilation albums released by the Norwegian electronic music group Icon of Coil in 2006. Each released separately as re-issues of their first 3 albums ('Serenity is the Devil', 'The Soul is in the Software' & remix album 'One Nation Under Beat'), 2 singles ('Shallow Nation' & 'Access And Amplify') and EP ('Seren EP'), which were all either out of print, or hard to find.

== Track listings ==
=== I: Serenity is the Devil / Shallow Nation ===
I: Serenity is the Devil / Shallow Nation

1. "Activate" - 5:26
2. "Regret" - 5:04
3. "Shallow Nation" - 4:46
4. "Down on Me" - 4:05
5. "Former Self" - 4:51
6. "Everlasting" - 5:22
7. "Situations Like These" - 4:23
8. "Fiction" - 5:13
9. "You Just Died" - 5:09
10. "Floorkiller" - 9:21
11. "Shallow Nation" (Original Version) - 4:18
12. "Shallow Nation" (Club Mix) - 5:40
13. "Floorkiller" - 6:20
14. "Shallow Nation" (Radio Edit) - 3:50

=== II: Seren Ep / One Nation Under Beat ===
II: Seren Ep / One Nation Under Beat

1. "Situations Like These" (Single Version) - 9:08
2. "Come Alive" - 6:14
3. "Situations Like These" (Moonitor Remix) - 2:08
4. "Everlasting" (Psyche Remix) - 9:11
5. "Situations Like These" (Album Version) - 3:55
6. "Situations Like These" (Edit) - 6:54
7. "Former Self" (V.1.0) - 5:59
8. "Brighter Day" (V.1.0) - 4:52
9. "We Need" (Club Mix) - 7:17
10. "Repeat it" (Apoptygma Berzerk Remix) - 4:10
11. "Confront" (Floorkiller Remix by Epa) - 4:30
12. "We Need" (Water Remix by Sector9) - 4:39
13. "Former Self" (Radio Edit) - 4:37
14. "Untitled Track" - 4:44

=== III: The Soul is in the Software / Access And Amplify ===
III: The Soul is in the Software / Access And Amplify

1. "Comment" - 0:27
2. "Thrillcapsule" - 6:03
3. "Violations" - 4:32
4. "In Absence" - 5:02
5. "Access And Amplify" - 4:59
6. "Everything is Real?" - 5:10
7. "Other Half of Me" - 4:37
8. "Love is Blood" - 5:41
9. "Disconnect" - 3:53
10. "Simulated" - 4:05
11. "Access And Amplify" - 4:59
12. "The Soul is in the B-Side" - 7:11
13. "Access And Amplify" (Club Mix) - 7:43
14. "Access And Amplify" (Hudlager Remix) - 5:22
15. "Access And Amplify" (Edit) - 04:01

=== Credits ===
All songs written, produced and recorded by Icon of Coil.
