= Icon of Coil =

Norwegian band

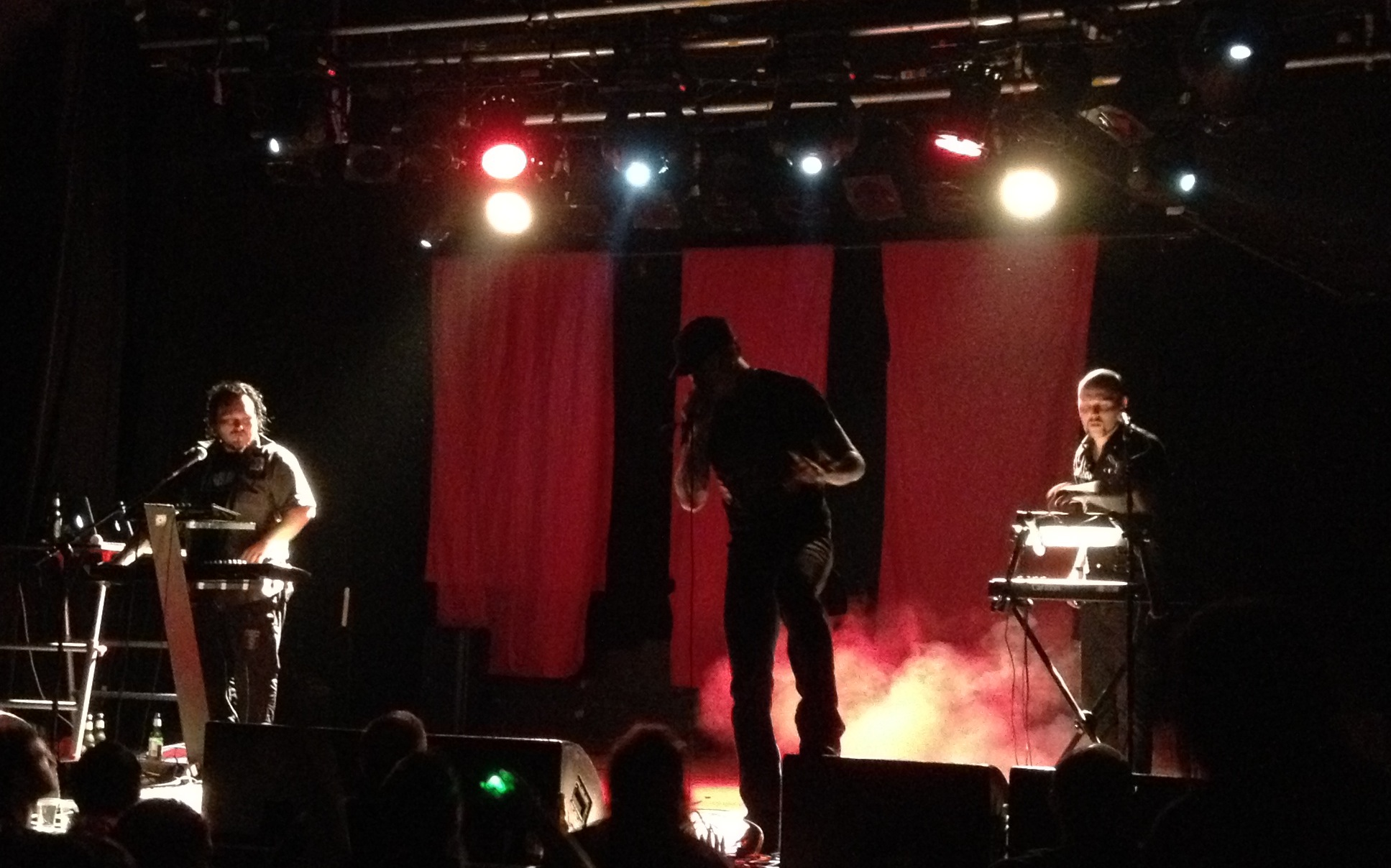
- Icon of Coil, October 2011; Left to right: Sebastian Komor, Andy LaPlegua, Christian Lund

Background information
- Origin: Fredrikstad, Norway
- Genres: Electronic, EBM
- Years active: 1997–present
- Labels: Metropolis Records (North America); Out of Line Music (Germany)
- Members: Andy LaPlegua; Sebastian Komor; Christian Lund

Icon of Coil is a Norwegian electronic music band. The band was established as a solo project in 1997 by Andy LaPlegua who was joined by former Sector 9 (now Moonitor and Zombie Girl) bandmate Sebastian Komor to perform live. With the release of Shallow Nation, the band's first single, Komor joined full-time. In 2000, Christian Lund joined the live lineup. Later that year, the band's first full-length album, Serenity is the Devil, was released, which climbed to number one on the Deutsche Alternative Charts. Shortly thereafter, Lund became a full-time band member.

== History ==
=== Formation ===
In 1997, Andy LaPlegua established the project, Icon of Coil, which was primarily a concept built around a logo, graphic design and music. Soon after the inception, the music soon turned out to be the most important part of the concept and LaPlegua invited Sebastian Komor, who he had worked with before on the project Sector 9, (now called Moonitor) in 1996, to work with him on the project as a live member. After just a couple of gigs and the release of IOC’s first single, "Shallow Nation", Komor became a full-time member.

=== Shallow Nation (2000) ===
Shallow Nation, released early in 2000, sold out the first thousand copies after only two weeks in the stores, which resulted in a deal with the Norwegian record label Tatra Records. Around that same time Tatra Records released the compilation Sex, Goth & Electronics, to which IOC contributed an exclusive version of their song "Repeat It".

Before they started working on their second release, IOC did programming for the Apoptygma Berzerk track "Starsign". Soon afterwards, they traveled to Germany, with live member Jon Holm, to support Apoptygma on their Welcome to Earth tour 2000 at their gigs in Frankfurt, Cottbus and Leipzig before going back to Norway to play together at Rockefeller in Oslo.

One Nation Under Beat debuted in the top 20 on the DAC-chart (Deutsch Alternative Chart) for eight weeks and peaked at number three.

In late spring of 2000 at a gig in Uddevalla, Sweden, Christian Lund joined the band as a live-member and went on stage with LaPlegua and Komor for the first time. Along with being the vocalist for his En Route project, Lund had a background from a melodious EBM Fredrikstad-based band called Elected By Fear, where he played together with Fredrik Hansen from Echo Image (who also played at that gig) and Marius Johnsen from Centravibe.

=== Serenity is the Devil (2000–2001) ===
The year 2000 saw IOC's first full-length release, Serenity is the Devil, in November 2000. The album peaked at number three on the DAC-chart and was ranked #16 on the DAC Top 50 Albums of 2000. After the album's release, the band went to tour Germany together with Beborn Beton. With nine gigs, positive feedback from the audience and very good reviews on the debut album, IOC gained a following in the synth/industrial scene. The EP One Nation Under Beat was also released in 2000 and ranked #47 on the DAC Top 100 Singles chart for 2000.

Shortly afterward, the album crossed the Atlantic and was released in North America by Metropolis Records. On March 29, 2001, the band itself followed and boarded a plane to Chicago. The song Situations Like These from the (then) forthcoming Seren EP was played live for the first time to an American audience.

The summer started with a successful show in Leipzig, Germany, at Wave-Gotik-Treffen. The following festivals included CSD, Zillo Festival, Xtreaktor Festival, Eurorock, Infest and ended at M'era Luna.

Situations Like These became a big club hit and the band was ready for a second tour (this time in a Nightliner touring bus) of North America with VNV Nation. The leg began in Chicago on the 16th of November. Icon of Coil, VNV Nation and the rest of the crew continued up to Canada, down the east coast to Florida, through Texas to the West coast and Hollywood, where they did their 15th show. The four-week tour ended in Edmonton, Alberta, Canada.

=== The Soul is in the Software (2002) ===
During their tours, the band found the time to write material for their second album, The Soul is in the Software, which was released in April 2002 and stayed at number one on the DAC for several weeks. IOC then performed at two more festivals: The Dark Jubilee Festival in London, and later as the Sunday headliner for Synthpop Goes the World in Toronto, Ontario, Canada.

=== Machines Are Us (2004) and Uploaded And Remixed (2004) ===
In 2004, their third album, Machines Are Us, was released. Icon of Coil then released their remix album Uploaded And Remixed at the tail end of 2004, which featured new mixes of songs from their first two records and two exclusive tracks.

=== Present ===
On August 6, 2012, Icon of Coil released a new song, "PerfectSex", as a pay-what-you-want download on Bandcamp. The single release preceded a North American tour and started rumors of a new album. Most recently, in November 2015 IOC performed on the main stage at the Orus Fest in Mexico City. In December 2018, Icon of Coil performed dates across Germany.

== Discography ==
- Shallow Nation (MCD) (2000)
- One Nation Under Beat (MCD) (2000)
- Serenity Is the Devil (2000)
- Seren EP (2001)
- Access and Amplify (MCD) (2002)
- The Soul Is in the Software (2002)
- Android (MCD) (2003)
- Machines Are Us (2004)
- Machines Are Us (2CD) Limited edition (2004)
- Uploaded and Remixed (2004)
- Uploaded and Remixed / Shelter Ep (2CD) Limited edition (2004)
- I-II-III (2006)

== Related bands ==
- Combichrist
- Panzer AG
- Zombie Girl
