= Zombie Girl =

Canadian industrial rock project

- Genres: Electro-industrial; Industrial rock
- Years active: 2006–present
- Labels: Alfa Matrix; Metropolis
- Members: Renee Cooper
- Past members: Sebastian Komor

Zombie Girl is a Canadian electro-industrial/industrial rock project started in 2005. Initially composed of Renee Cooper and producer Sebastian Komor, the group now consists exclusively of Cooper, who uses live musicians. The band's lyrics and themes center on black humor and B movie horror films. Zombie Girl also uses rock and roll-style grooves with their mostly synthetic instruments. She has produced two EPs and two full-length albums on the Alfa Matrix record label. Her albums are sold in the United States under the Metropolis Records label.

== History ==
Zombie Girl released their first album, Back From the Dead, in 2006.

In 2008, Zombie Girl released a second album, Blood, Brains & Rock 'n' Roll. It was delayed due to three separate printing companies refusing to print artwork that contained copious amounts of blood, as well as a brain on a plate.

After Cooper and Komor parted ways, Komor released an EP without her, entitled Halloween, in 2009. Cooper continued as a solo act, backed up by various musicians; she released an EP, Panic Attack, and an album, Killer Queen, in 2015.

== Filmography ==
- Little Big Boy (2012) (as Zombie Girl) - Headshot Actress

== Discography ==
- Back From the Dead (2006) Alfa Matrix/Metropolis Records
- Blood, Brains & Rock 'n' Roll (2007) Alfa Matrix/Metropolis Records
- The Halloween EP (2009)
- Killer Queen (2015)
