= Debris =

Scattered remains of something destroyed or discarded

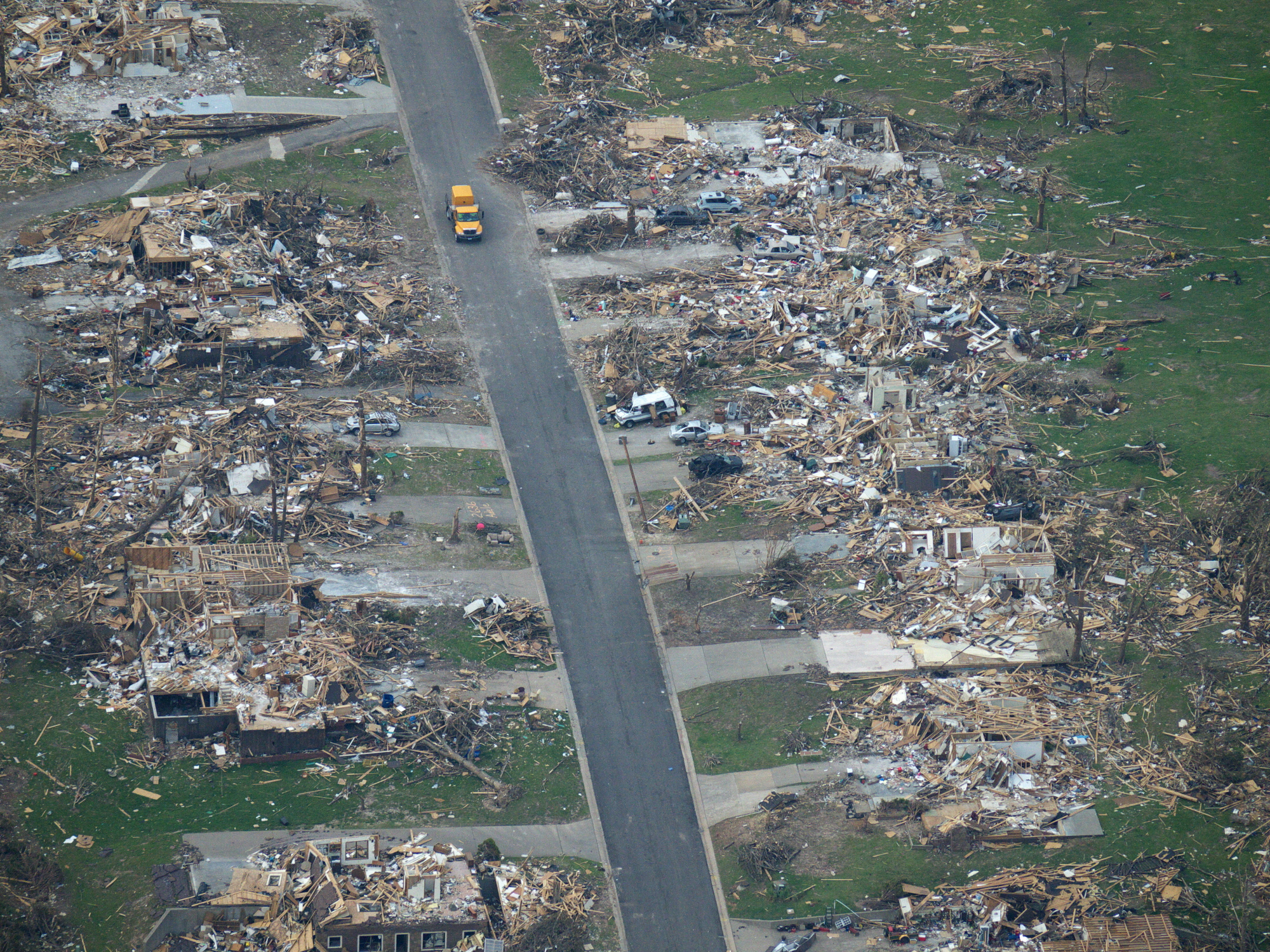
Debris still present 10 days after an EF5 tornado struck the city of Joplin, Missouri.

Debris (UK: /ˈdɛbri, ˈdeɪbri/, US: /dəˈbriː/) is rubble, wreckage, ruins, litter and discarded garbage/refuse/trash, scattered remains of something destroyed, or, as in geology, large rock fragments left by a melting glacier, etc. Depending on context, debris can refer to a number of different things. The first apparent use of the French word in English is in a 1701 description of the army of Prince Rupert upon its retreat from a battle with the army of Oliver Cromwell, in England.

== Disaster ==
In disaster scenarios, tornadoes leave behind large pieces of houses and mass destruction overall. This debris also flies around the tornado itself when it is in progress. The tornado's winds capture debris it kicks up in its wind orbit, and spins it inside its vortex. The tornado's wind radius is larger than the funnel itself. Tsunamis and hurricanes also bring large amounts of debris, such as Hurricane Katrina in 2005 and Hurricane Sandy in 2012. Earthquakes rock cities to rubble debris.

== Geological ==
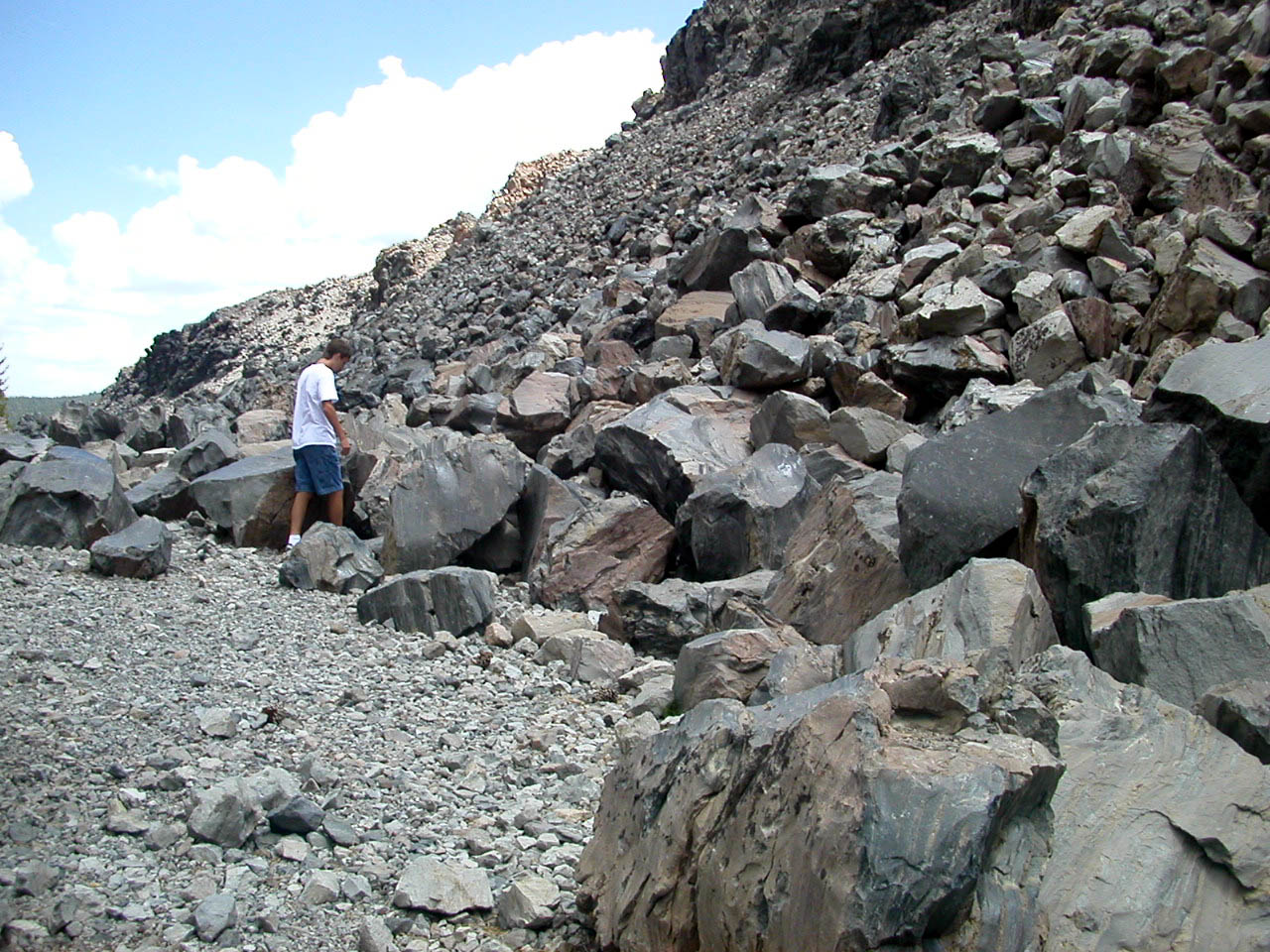
Obsidian debris (talus), Obsidian Dome, California.

In geology, debris usually applies to the remains of geological activity including landslides, volcanic explosions, avalanches, mudflows or Glacial lake outburst floods (Jökulhlaups) and moraine, lahars, and lava eruptions. Geological debris sometimes moves in a stream called a debris flow. When it accumulates at the base of hillsides, it can be called "talus" or "scree".

In mining, debris called attle usually consists of rock fragments which contain little or no ore.

== Marine ==
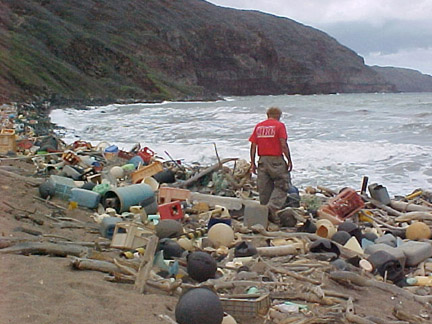
Marine debris washed ashore on Hawaii

Marine debris applies to floating garbage such as bottles, cans, styrofoam, cruise ship waste, offshore oil and gas exploration and production facilities pollution, and fishing paraphernalia from professional and recreational boaters. Marine debris is also called litter or flotsam and jetsam. Objects that can constitute marine debris include used automobile tires, detergent bottles, medical wastes, discarded fishing line and nets, soda cans, and bilge waste solids.

In addition to being unsightly, it can pose a serious threat to marine life, boats, swimmers, divers, and others. For example, each year millions of seabirds, sea turtles, fish, and marine mammals become entangled in marine debris, or ingest plastics which they have mistaken for food. As many as 30,000 northern fur seals per year get caught in abandoned fishing nets and either drown or suffocate. Whales mistake plastic bags for squid, and birds may mistake plastic pellets for fish eggs. At other times, animals accidentally eat the plastic while feeding on natural food.

The largest concentration of marine debris is the Great Pacific Garbage Patch.

Marine debris most commonly originates from land-based sources. Various international agencies are currently working to reduce marine debris levels around the world.

== Meteorological ==
In meteorology, debris usually applies to the remains of human habitation and natural flora after storm related destruction. This debris is also commonly referred to as storm debris. Storm debris commonly consists of roofing material, downed tree limbs, downed signs, downed power lines and poles, and wind-blown garbage. Storm debris can become a serious problem immediately after a storm, in that it often blocks access to individuals and communities that may require emergency services. This material frequently exists in such large quantities that disposing of it becomes a serious issue for a community. In addition, storm debris is often hazardous by its very nature, since, for example, downed power lines annually account for storm-related deaths.

== Space ==
Space debris usually refers to the remains of spacecraft that have either fallen to Earth or are still orbiting Earth. Space debris may also consist of natural components such as chunks of rock and ice. The problem of space debris has grown as various space programs have left legacies of launches, explosions, repairs, and discards in both low Earth orbit and more remote orbits. These orbiting fragments have reached a great enough proportion to constitute a hazard to future space launches of both satellite and crewed vehicles. Various government agencies and international organizations are beginning to track space debris and also research possible solutions to the problem. While many of these items, ranging in size from nuts and bolts to entire satellites and spacecraft, may fall to Earth, other items located in more remote orbits may stay aloft for centuries. The velocity of some of these pieces of space junk have been clocked in excess of 17,000 miles per hour (27,000 km/h). A piece of space debris falling to Earth leaves a fiery trail, just like a meteor.

A debris disk is a circumstellar disk of dust and debris in orbit around a star.

== Surgical ==
In medicine, debris usually refers to biological matter that has accumulated or lodged in surgical instruments and is referred to as surgical debris. The presence of surgical debris can result in cross-infections or nosocomial infections if not removed and the affected surgical instruments or equipment properly disinfected.

== War ==
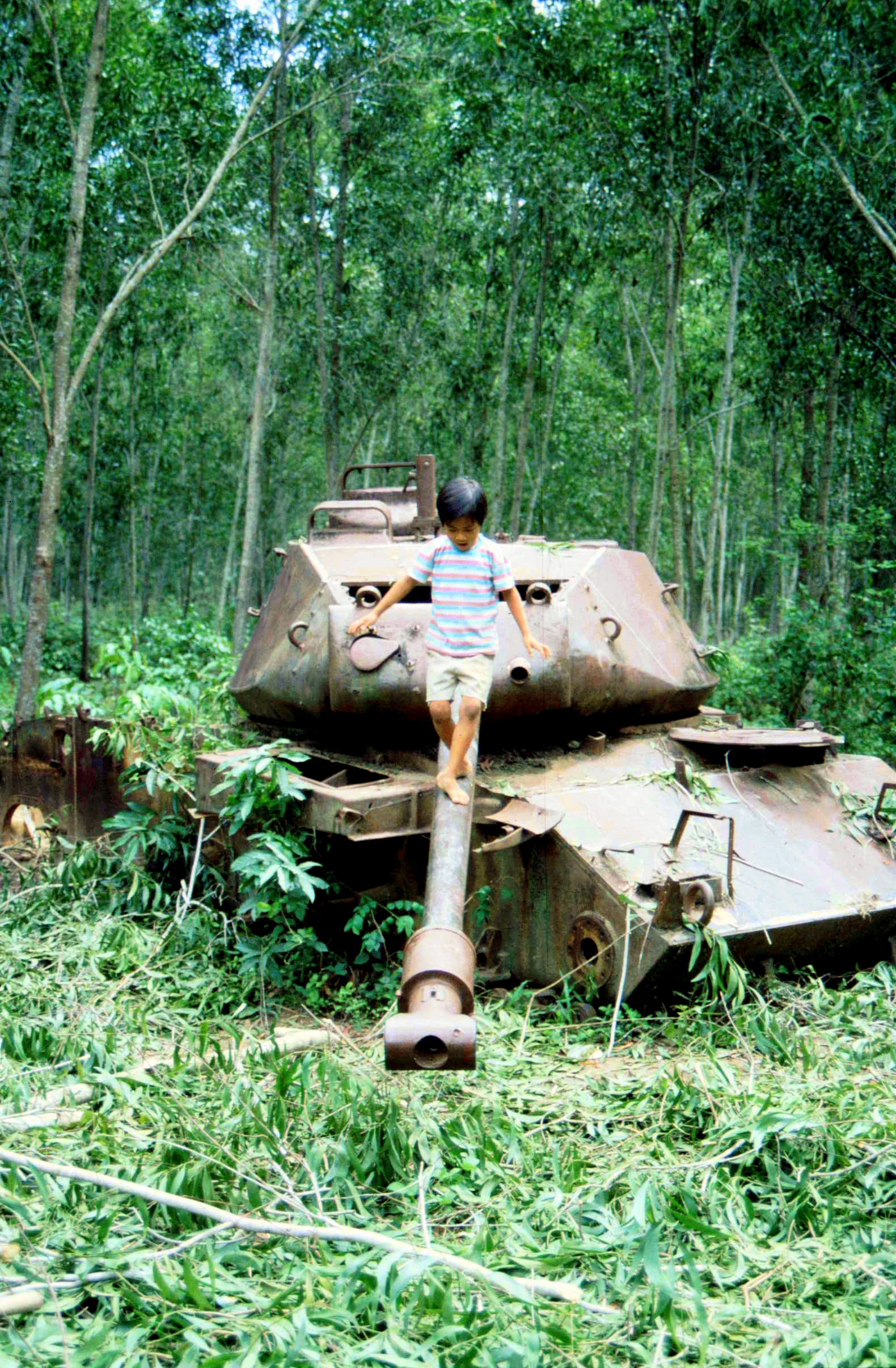
A child plays on an abandoned M41 tank outside Phnom Penh, Cambodia in 1991

In the aftermath of a war, large areas of the region of conflict are often strewn with war debris in the form of abandoned or destroyed hardware and vehicles, mines, unexploded ordnance, bullet casings and other fragments of metal.

Much war debris has the potential to be lethal and continues to kill and maim civilian populations for years after the end of a conflict. The risks from war debris may be sufficiently high to prevent or delay the return of refugees. In addition war debris may contain hazardous chemicals or radioactive components that can contaminate the land or poison civilians who come into contact with it. Many mine clearance agencies are also involved in the clearance of war debris.

Land mines in particular are very dangerous as they can remain active for decades after a conflict, which is why they have been banned by international war regulations.

In November 2006 the Protocol on Explosive Remnants of War came into effect with 92 countries subscribing to the treaty that requires the parties involved in a conflict to assist with the removal of unexploded ordnance following the end of hostilities.

Some of the countries most affected by war debris are Afghanistan, Angola, Cambodia, Iraq and Laos.

Similarly military debris may be found in and around firing range and military training areas.

Debris can also be used as cover for military purposes, depending on the situation.

== Culinary ==
In South Louisiana's Creole and Cajun cultures, debris (pronounced "DAY-bree") refers to chopped organs such as liver, heart, kidneys, tripe, spleen, brain, lungs and pancreas.

== See also ==
- Debris fallout
- Woody debris
