= Debris (Ayria album) =

Studio album by Ayria
- Released: November 7, 2003
- Recorded: 2003
- Genres: Electro-industrial, futurepop
- Length: 69:58
- Label: Alfa Matrix
- Producer: Shaun Frandsen

Ayria chronology
Debris (2003)	My Revenge on the World (2005)

Limited edition cover

Professional ratings
Review scores
Source	Rating
Regen Magazine	(not rated)

Debris is the debut studio album by electro-industrial project Ayria. It was released on November 7, 2003, with a deluxe edition featuring a bonus disc and alternate packaging.

== Track listing ==
1. "DOS" - 4:37
2. "Horrible Dream" - 5:39
3. "Had Something" - 5:01
4. "Mercury" - 5:56
5. "The Radio" - 5:58
6. "Red Shift" - 5:28
7. "Sapphire" - 6:15
8. "Disease" - 5:30
9. "Start Again" - 6:07
10. "Debris" - 5:06
11. "Substance" - 4:04
12. "Beta Complex" - 6:08
13. "Kiss Me Goodnight as I'm Falling Asleep" - 4:08

== Bonus disc ==
1. "Disease (Armageddon Dildos Mix)"
2. "Horrible Dream (Pzycho Bitch Mix)"
3. "Substance ("More Pills" XP8 Mix)"
4. "Mercury ("Mercury Rising" V01d Mix)"
5. "Horrible Dream ("Nightmare" Accessory Mix)"
6. "Had Something ("Snow Lake" Interface Mix)"
7. "Disease ("Tractor Factor" Boole Mix)"
8. "Horrible Dream (Glis Mix)"
9. "Sapphire (Implant Mix)"
10. "Scattered Debris (Slipshod Mix)"
11. "Disease (NamNamBulu mix)"
12. "Horrible Dream (XPQ-21 mix)"
13. "Disease (EchoRausch Mix)"
