= Glis =

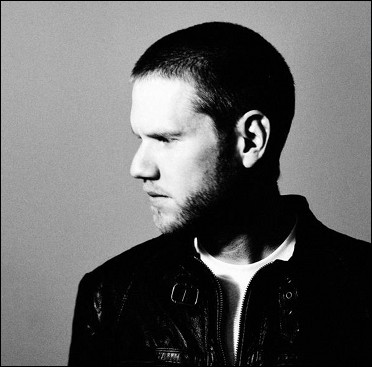
- Shaun Frandsen of Glis

Background information
- Origin: Seattle, Washington, United States
- Genres: electro-industrial, futurepop, synthpop, post-punk, EBM, ambient, techno
- Years active: 2001-present
- Labels: A.D.S.R. Musicwerks (USA), Alfa Matrix (Belgium), Shadowplay Records (Russia)

Glis is an electronic music project founded in 2001 by Shaun Frandsen of Seattle, Washington, United States. The band has experienced several lineup changes and guest appearances, with frontman Shaun Frandsen acting as primary producer, vocalist, songwriter, and instrumentalist. Notable guest, Jean-Luc De Meyer of Front 242, contributed vocals for two studio tracks on the album "Nemesis" in 2005. Glis began to use guitar as a production counterpoint on the album "Phoenix" in 2013.

== Discography ==
=== Albums ===
- Extract (2001)
- Balance (2003)
- Nemesis (2005)
- Phoenix (2013)
- Gateway to Oblivion (2024)
- Winterwerk (2026)
- Artifacts in Sequence (2026)
- Green Silence (2026)
- Momentos (2026)

=== Remix albums ===
- Equilibrium (2003)
- A Shot and a Bassline (2008)
- Best Mixes (2026)

=== Singles & EPs ===
- Disappear! (2004)
- Apocalypse Parties (2012)
- Seconds (2013)
- Sunrise Forever (2023)
- Control (2024)
- Ascension (2024)
- Yesterday's Anthems (2024)
- Severity One (2024)
- DRTY FCKN DSKO (2024) - as Glis
- Apocalypse Parties (electro mix) (2024)
- Sex Object (2024) - Kraftwerk cover
- Happiness (2025)
- A Different Dream (2025)
- Street Dragon Ninja (2025)
- Life (2025) - Karl Bartos cover
- Winterwerk vol. 1 (2025)
- No Pulse (2025 mix) (2025)
- Crush (2025 mix) (2025)
- Morning Sun (2025)
- Turbo Lush (2025)
- Luminous Tides (2025)
- Winterwerk vol. 2 (2026)
- Bring it all Down! (2026)
- Garden of the Unseen (2026)
- Velocity Prime (2026)
- Pine Labyrinth (2026)
- Ghosts of Copper Hollow (2026)
- The Hidden Walker's Dream (2026)
- Murmurs in the Airwaves (2026)
- The Whisperers (2026)
- Echoes from Raven Ridge (2026)
- Computer Love (2026) - Kraftwerk cover
- Where the Trail Ends (2026)
- Acidopolis (2026)
- Masters of Grit (2026)
- Night Transit (2026)
- The Other Side of Sleep (2026)
- Home Electronics (2026)
- Axlr8.EP (2026)

=== Other appearances ===
- Debris (2003) - as producer
- DRTY FCKN DSKO (2012) - as Shaun F
