= Lamb of God discography =

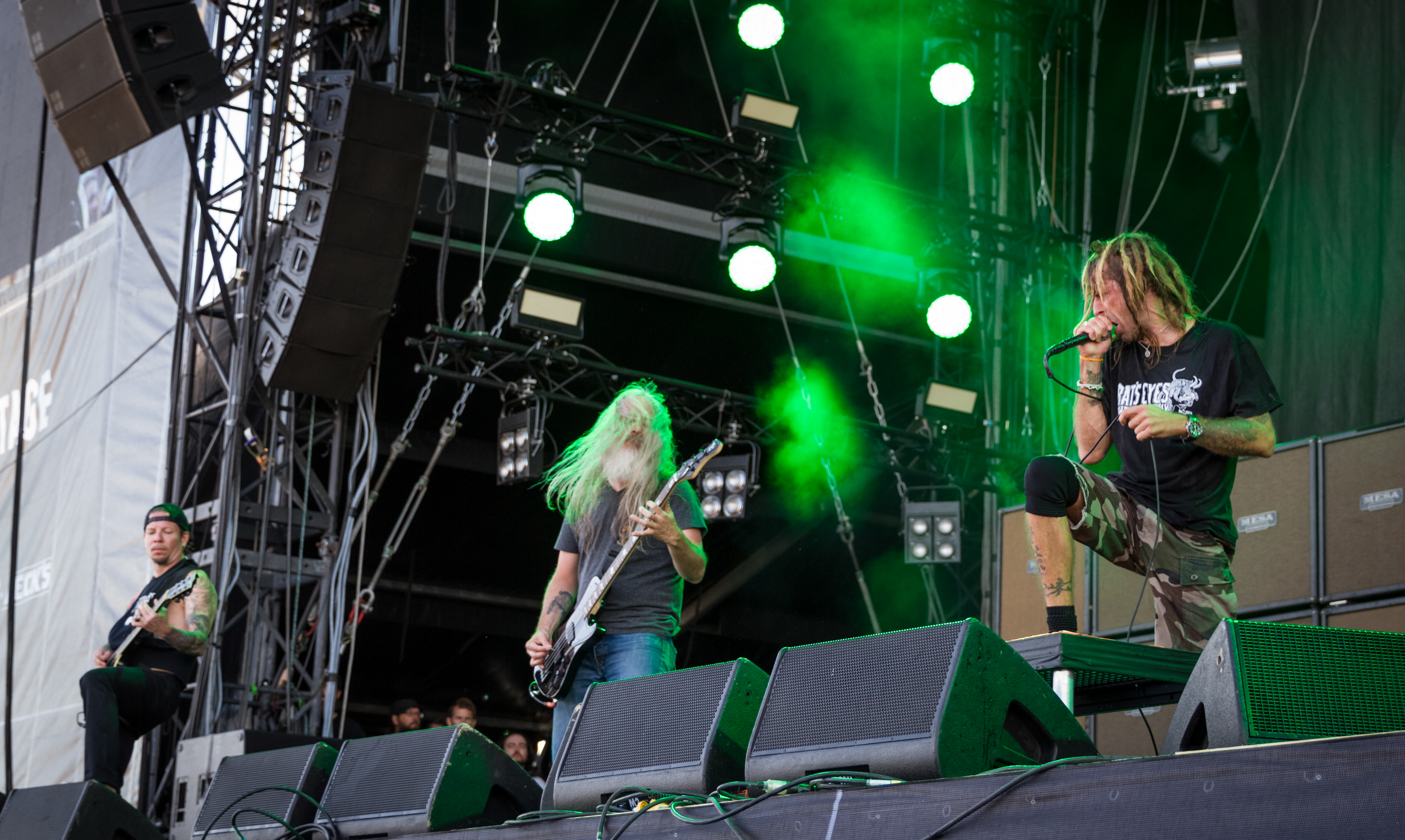
- Lamb of God performing in 2015
- Studio albums: 10
- Extended plays: 2
- Live albums: 1
- Compilation albums: 1
- Singles: 39
- Video albums: 3
- Music videos: 28

The discography of American heavy metal band Lamb of God consists of ten studio albums (two as Burn the Priest), two EPs, one live album, one compilation album, three video albums, 39 singles, and 28 music videos. Originally known under the moniker "Burn the Priest", the band was founded in 1994 by Chris Adler, John Campbell and Mark Morton. In 1999, Burn the Priest released their self-titled full-length debut, released through Legion Records, shortly after the release, the band changed its name to "Lamb of God" and signed a record deal with Prosthetic Records. The group's next album, New American Gospel, was released in 2000. Produced by Devin Townsend, 2003's As the Palaces Burn was critically acclaimed, with Revolver magazine awarding it "Album of the Year".

In 2004, Ashes of the Wake was released through the band's major label debut—through Epic Records—Ashes of the Wake, that sold 35,000 copies in its first week of release and peak at number 27 on the Billboard 200 and was certified gold by the RIAA in February 2016. Lamb of God's second video album, titled Killadelphia in reference to the location where it was filmed, at Trocadero Theatre in Philadelphia during October 2004, was released in June 2005—sold 8,000 in its first-week and peak at number 4 on the Billboard Top Music Videos chart—being certified gold by the Recording Industry Association of America (RIAA) in August the same year, for sales in excess of 50,000 copies. At the end of the same year was released the audio edition. Their second full-length issued by Epic label, 2006's Sacrament, in its first week of release sold around 63,000 copies in the United States and peak at number 8 on the Billboard 200 chart and was certified gold by the RIAA in September 2019. In July 2008, Lamb of God release the follow-up to Killadelphia entitled Walk with Me in Hell, the two-disc DVD peaked at number 2 on the Billboard Top Music Videos chart (their career-best position to date), selling over 13,000 copies in its first week of release in the US. Walk with Me in Hell was certified gold by RIAA in August the same year. Lamb of God's fifth studio album Wrath, was released through Epic in the US, and Roadrunner Records worldwide, on February 24, 2009. It debuted at number 2 on the US Billboard 200 chart, selling nearly 68,000 copies. Lamb of God released two more albums—Resolution (2012) and VII: Sturm und Drang (2015)—before parting ways with original drummer Chris Adler in 2019, who was replaced by Art Cruz. The band's self-titled eighth studio album was released on June 19, 2020, making it their first full-length in five years and first release with Cruz.

== Albums ==
=== Studio albums ===
List of studio albums, with selected chart positions and certifications
Title	Album details	Peak chart positions										Sales	Certifications
Title	Album details	US	AUS	CAN	FIN	FRA	GER	JPN	NLD	SWI	UK	Sales	Certifications
New American Gospel	Released: September 26, 2000; Label: Prosthetic	—	—	—	—	—	—	—	—	—	—	US: 100,000+	
As the Palaces Burn	Released: May 6, 2003; Label: Prosthetic	64	—	—	—	—	—	—	—	—	—	US: 270,000+	
Ashes of the Wake	Released: August 31, 2004; Label: Epic / Prosthetic	27	—	—	—	—	—	—	—	—	126	US: 465,000+	RIAA: Gold; BPI: Silver; MC: Gold
Sacrament	Released: August 22, 2006; Label: Epic / Prosthetic	8	25	—	—	—	—	—	—	—	89	US: 332,000+	RIAA: Gold; BPI: Silver; MC: Gold
Wrath	Released: February 23, 2009; Label: Epic / Roadrunner	2	8	1	5	137	61	59	52	56	25	US: 202,000+	
Resolution	Released: January 24, 2012; Label: Epic / Roadrunner	3	3	2	5	115	37	56	36	30	19	US: 161,000	
VII: Sturm und Drang	Released: July 24, 2015; Label: Epic / Nuclear Blast	3	2	1	3	55	12	69	13	5	7		
Lamb of God	Released: June 19, 2020; Label: Epic / Nuclear Blast	15	5	11	6	117	7	39	44	4	16		
Omens	Released: October 7, 2022; Label: Epic / Nuclear Blast	15	61	9	10	110	21	76	62	14	34		
Into Oblivion	Released: March 13, 2026; Label: Epic / Nuclear Blast	21	16	100	16	103	17	49	—	13	48		
"—" denotes a recording that did not chart or was not released in that territory.

=== Burn the Priest albums ===
Title	Album details	Peak chart positions	
Title	Album details	US	CAN
Burn the Priest	Released: April 13, 1999; Label: Legion	—	—
Legion: XX	Released: May 18, 2018; Label: Epic / Nuclear Blast	107	53
"—" denotes a recording that did not chart or was not released in that territory.

=== Live albums ===
Title	Album details	Notes
Killadelphia	Released: December 13, 2005; Label: Epic	Audio from the concert documented in the DVD of the same name.

=== Compilation albums ===
Title	Album details	Notes
Hourglass	Released: June 1, 2010; Label: Epic	3 CDs of their greatest hits and unreleased songs.

== EPs ==
Title	Album details	Notes
Pure American Metal	Released: August 31, 2004; Label: Epic	1. Bloodletting: From the 1999 self-titled Burn the Priest album (1998 mix).; 2. The Subtle Arts of Murder and Persuasion: From the 2000 release New American Gospel.; 3. 11th Hour: From the 2003 release As the Palaces Burn.; 4. Black Label (Live): Live audio taken from the "Hellfest 2003" DVD.; 5. Pre-production demo version of "Laid to Rest", the lead track off the 2004 release Ashes of the Wake.
The Duke	Released: November 18, 2016; Label: Nuclear Blast	Released in honor of Wayne Ford, a fan and a friend of the band who was diagnosed with leukemia and died in February 2015.; 1. The Duke; 2. Culling; 3. Still Echoes (Live from Rock am Ring); 4. 512 (Live from Bonnaroo); 5. Engage the Fear Machine (Live from Bonnaroo)

== Singles ==
Song	Year	Peak chart positions				Certifications	Album
Song	Year	US Hard Rock Digi.	US Hard Rock	US Main. Rock	US Rock	Certifications	Album
"Black Label"	2001	—	—	—	—		New American Gospel
"Ruin"	2003	—	—	—	—		As the Palaces Burn
"11th Hour"	2003	—	—	—	—		As the Palaces Burn
"As the Palaces Burn"	2003	—	—	—	—		As the Palaces Burn
"Laid to Rest"	2004	—	—	—	—	RIAA: Gold	Ashes of the Wake
"Now You've Got Something to Die For"	2004	—	—	—	—		Ashes of the Wake
"Redneck"	2006	—	—	—	—	RIAA: Platinum	Sacrament
"Walk with Me in Hell"	2006	—	—	—	—		Sacrament
"Blacken the Cursed Sun"	2006	—	—	—	—		Sacrament
"Contractor"	2008	—	—	—	—		Wrath
"Set to Fail"	2009	—	—	—	—		Wrath
"In Your Words"	2009	—	—	—	—		Wrath
"Hit the Wall"	2011	25	—	—	—	data-sort-value="" style="background: var(--background-color-interactive, #ececec); color: var(--color-base, inherit); vertical-align: middle; text-align: center; " class="table-na" | Non-album single	
"Ghost Walking"	2012	21	—	—	—		Resolution
"Desolation"	2012	—	—	—	—		Resolution
"Vigil"	2013	—	—	—	—		As the Palaces Burn (10th Anniversary)
"Still Echoes"	2015	14	—	—	—		VII: Sturm und Drang
"512"	2015	21	—	—	—		VII: Sturm und Drang
"Overlord"	2015	—	—	33	—		VII: Sturm und Drang
"Erase This"	2015	—	—	—	—		VII: Sturm und Drang
"Embers"	2015	—	—	—	—		VII: Sturm und Drang
"The Duke"	2016	19	—	40	—		The Duke
"Culling"	2016	25	—	—	—		The Duke
"Inherit the Earth"	2018	—	—	—	—		Legion: XX
"I Against I"	2018	—	—	—	—		Legion: XX
"Kerosene"	2018	—	—	—	—		Legion: XX
"Checkmate"	2020	4	15	—	38		Lamb of God
"Memento Mori"	2020	5	9	—	33		Lamb of God
"New Colossal Hate"	2020	—	22	—	—		Lamb of God
"Routes"	2020	—	23	—	—		Lamb of God
"Ghost Shaped People"	2020	—	—	—	—		Lamb of God
"Wake Up Dead"	2022	5	20	—	—	data-sort-value="" style="background: var(--background-color-interactive, #ececec); color: var(--color-base, inherit); vertical-align: middle; text-align: center; " class="table-na" | Non-album single	
"Nevermore"	2022	7	—	—	—		Omens
"Evidence"	2023	12	—	—	—		Omens (1st Anniversary bonus track)
"Floods of Triton" (with Mastodon)	2024	9	—	—	—	rowspan="2"data-sort-value="" style="background: var(--background-color-interactive, #ececec); color: var(--color-base, inherit); vertical-align: middle; text-align: center; " class="table-na" | Non-album single	
"Children of the Grave"	2025	—	—	—	—		
"Sepsis"	2025	—	—	—	—		Into Oblivion
"Parasocial Christ"	2025	8	—	—	—		Into Oblivion
"Into Oblivion"	2026	8	20	—	—		Into Oblivion
"Blunt Force Blues"	2026	—	—	—	—		Into Oblivion
"—" denotes a recording that did not chart.

=== Other Charted Songs ===
Song	Year	Peak chart positions		Album
Song	Year	US Hard Rock Digi.	US Hard Rock	Album
"Gears"	2020	—	17	Lamb of God
"The Death of Us"	2020	19	—	Bill and Ted Face the Music
"State of Unrest"	2023	19	—	Omens
"St. Catherine's Wheel"	2026	—	22	Into Oblivion
"Wire"	2026	6	—	Into Oblivion

== Videos ==
=== Video albums ===
Title	Album details	Notes	Certifications
Terror and Hubris	Released: January 13, 2004; Label: Epic (#56401); Format: DVD	Peaked at #31 on the Billboard Top Music Video chart	
Killadelphia	Released: May 10, 2005; Label: Epic (#57316); Format: DVD (+CD)	Peaked at #4 on the Billboard Top Music Video chart	RIAA: Platinum; ARIA: Gold; MC: Platinum
Walk with Me in Hell	Released: June 10, 2008; Label: Epic (#8287685327); Format: DVD	Peaked at #2 on the Billboard Top Music Video chart	RIAA: Platinum; MC: Gold

=== Music videos ===
Year	Album	Song	Director(s)
2002	New American Gospel	"Black Label"	Will Carsola
2003	As The Palaces Burn	"11th Hour"	Jason Joseph
2003	As The Palaces Burn	"Ruin"	Dan Rush
2003	As The Palaces Burn	"As the Palaces Burn"	Dan Rush
2004	Ashes of the Wake	"Laid to Rest"	Chris Sims
2005	Ashes of the Wake	"Now You've Got Something to Die For"	Doug Spangenberg
2005	Burn The Priest	"Bloodletting"	Doug Spangenberg
2006	Sacrament	"Redneck"	Bill Fishman
2007	Sacrament	"Walk with Me in Hell"	Doug Spangenberg
2009	Wrath	"Set to Fail"	Doug Spangenberg
2011	Resolution	"Ghost Walking"	MoreFrames
2012	Resolution	"Desolation"	Don Argott
2013	Killadelphia	"Vigil"	Don Argott
2015	VII : Sturm und Drang	"512"	Jorge Torres-Torres
2015	VII : Sturm und Drang	"Overlord"	Jorge Torres-Torres
2016	VII : Sturm und Drang	"Embers"	Zev Deans
2018	Legion : XX	"Inherit the Earth"	Travis Shinn
2018	Legion : XX	"Kerosene"	Zev Deans
2018	Legion : XX	"Jesus Built My Hotrod"	
2020	Lamb of God	"Checkmate"	
2020	Lamb of God	"Memento Mori"	Tom Flynn & Mike Watts
2020	Lamb of God	"Gears"	Tom Flynn & Mike Watts
2021	Lamb of God	"Ghost Shaped People"	Truman Kewley and Eddie Perez
2022	Omens	"Nevermore"	Zev Deans
2022	Omens	"Omens"	Tom Flynn & Mike Watts
2022	Omens	"Ditch"	Tom Flynn & Mike Watts
2025	"Into Oblivion"	"Sepsis"	Gianfranco Svagelj
2025	"Into Oblivion"	"Parasocial Christ"	Jon Vulpine
2026	"Into Oblivion"	"Into Oblivion"	Tom Flynn & Mike Watts
2026	"Into Oblivion"	"St. Catherine's Wheel"	Meriel O'Connell
