= Hourglass: The Anthology =

Hourglass (Anthology)

Compilation album by Lamb of God
- Released: June 1, 2010
- Genre: Groove metal; death metal; thrash metal; grindcore
- Length: 143:00
- Label: Epic

Lamb of God chronology
Wrath (2009)	Hourglass (Anthology) (2010)	Resolution (2012)

Professional ratings
Review scores
Source	Rating
Allmusic	3.5/5 stars

The Hourglass Anthology is a compilation album by American heavy metal band Lamb of God, released in three discs in 2010. The first disc is "Volume One: The Underground Years", which contains their best songs from when they were called "Burn the Priest", and songs from New American Gospel and As the Palaces Burn. The second disc is "Volume Two: The Epic Years", which contains songs from the albums Ashes of the Wake, Sacrament and Wrath. The third form was a box set with volume 1 and 2 and contains a third volume, "Volume 3: The Vault". This volume contains previously rare unreleased recordings.

== Track listing ==
All tracks are written by Lamb of God.

Volume 1: The Underground Years
No.	Title	Length
1.	"Black Label" (New American Gospel)	4:42
2.	"Ruin" (As the Palaces Burn)	3:54
3.	"Bloodletting" (Burn the Priest)	1:58
4.	"Pariah" (New American Gospel)	4:26
5.	"Resurrection 9" (Burn the Priest)	5:15
6.	"11th Hour" (As The Palaces Burn)	3:44
7.	"The Subtle Arts of Murder and Persuasion" (New American Gospel)	4:11
8.	"As the Palaces Burn" (As The Palaces Burn)	2:26
9.	"Terror and Hubris in the House of Frank Pollard" (New American Gospel)	5:39
10.	"Lies of Autumn" (Burn the Priest)	4:48
11.	"O.D.H.G.A.B.F.E." (New American Gospel)	5:13
12.	"Suffering Bastard" (Burn the Priest)	2:09
13.	"Vigil" (As the Palaces Burn)	4:44
Total length:		53:00

Volume 2: The Epic Years
No.	Title	Length
1.	"The Passing" (Wrath)	1:58
2.	"In Your Words" (Wrath)	5:25
3.	"Hourglass" (Ashes of the Wake)	4:01
4.	"Walk with Me in Hell" (Sacrament)	5:11
5.	"Contractor" (Wrath)	3:22
6.	"Now You've Got Something to Die For" (Ashes of the Wake)	3:40
7.	"Descending" (Sacrament)	3:36
8.	"Set to Fail" (Wrath)	3:46
9.	"Blacken the Cursed Sun" (Sacrament)	5:29
10.	"The Faded Line" (Ashes of the Wake)	4:37
11.	"Dead Seeds" (Wrath)	3:41
12.	"Redneck" (Sacrament)	3:41
13.	"Laid to Rest" (Ashes of the Wake)	3:50
Total length:		52:00

Volume 3: The Vault
No.	Title	Length
1.	"We Die Alone" (Wrath Special Edition)	4:38
2.	"Shoulder of Your God" (Wrath Special Edition)	5:55
3.	"Condemn the Hive" (Wrath Japanese Bonus Track)	3:41
4.	"Another Nail for your Coffin" (Ashes of the Wake Japanese Bonus Track)	4:36
5.	"Nippon" (New American Gospel Japanese Bonus Track)	3:55
6.	"Now You've got Something to Die For" (Rehearsal Demo)	3:51
7.	"Hourglass" (Rehearsal Demo)	4:32
8.	"More Time to Kill" (Rehearsal Demo)	3:41
9.	"Dead Seeds" (Demo Version)	3:52
10.	"In Your Words" (Demo Version)	5:18
11.	"Leech" (Demo Version)	2:28
12.	"Salivation" (Burn The Priest Tour Tape version)	2:09
13.	"Lame" (Burn The Priest Tour Tape version)	2:12
14.	"Duane" (Burn The Priest Tour Tape version)	2:12
15.	"Ruiner" (Burn The Priest 7 inch)	1:59
16.	"Ballad of Kansas City" (Burn the Priest 7 inch)	1:49
17.	"Suffering Bastard" (Burn The Priest 7 inch)	2:01
18.	"Preaching to the Converted" (Burn The Priest 7 inch)	2:21
Total length:		61:00

== Personnel ==
Lamb of God

- Randy Blythe - vocals
- Mark Morton - lead guitar
- Willie Adler - rhythm guitar
- John Campbell - bass
- Chris Adler - drums
