= List of awards and nominations received by Lamb of God =

Lamb of God awards and nominations
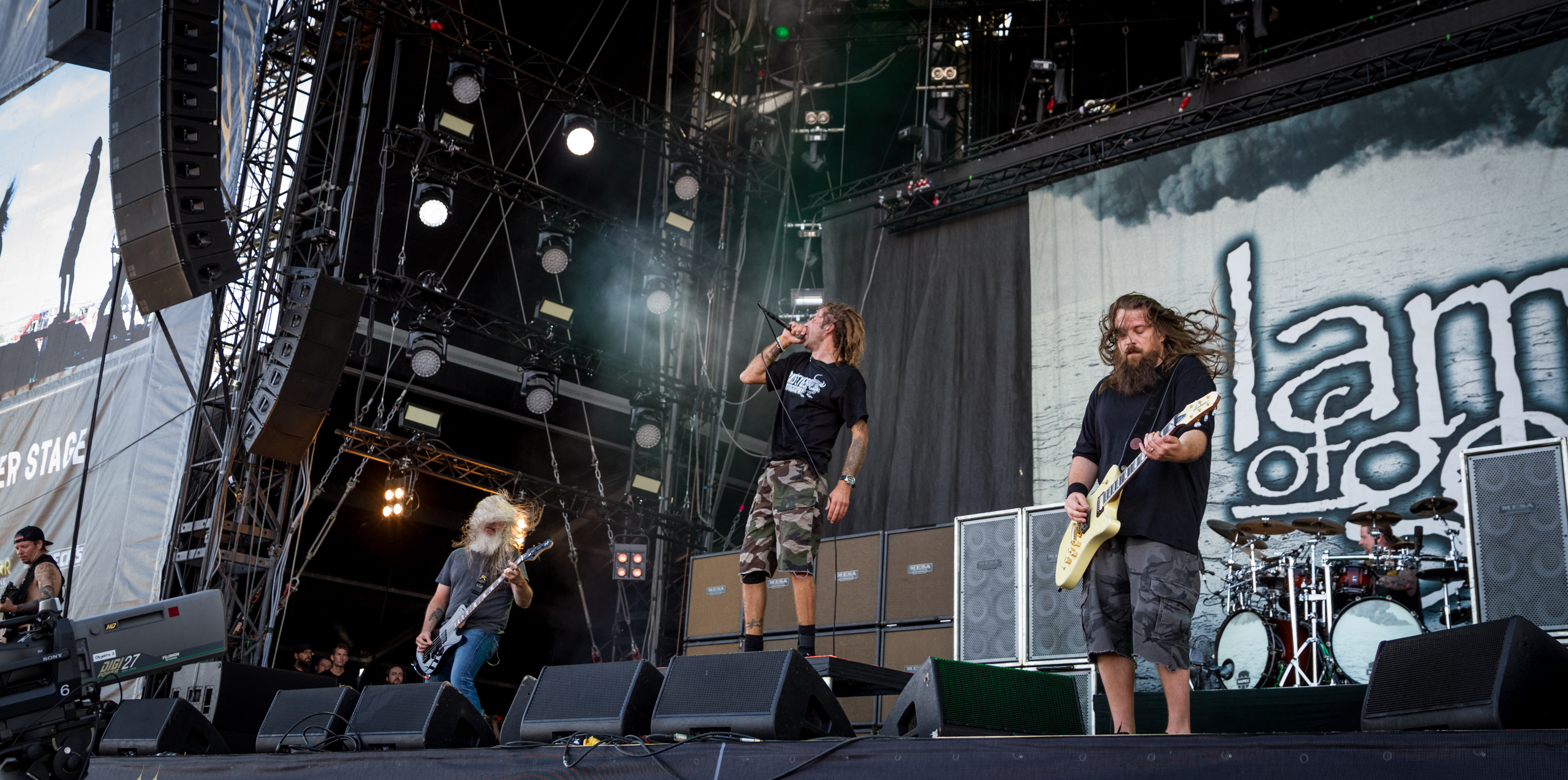
- Lamb of God at Rock am Ring 2015
Awards and nominations
Award	Wins	Nominations

Totals (Note: Certain award groups do not simply award one winner. They acknowledge several different recipients, have runners-up, and have third place. Since this is a specific recognition and is different from losing an award, runner-up mentions are considered wins in this award tally. For simplification and to avoid errors, each award in this list has been presumed to have had a prior nomination.)
- Wins: 16
- Nominations: 47

Lamb of God is an American heavy metal band from Richmond, Virginia. Formed in 1994 as Burn the Priest, the group consists of bassist John Campbell, vocalist Randy Blythe, guitarists Mark Morton and Willie Adler, and drummer Art Cruz. The band is considered one of the most prominent metal bands to come out of the 2000s. Over the course of their career the band has received many awards and nominations for their contributions to the music industry.

== Decibel Hall of Fame ==
Decibel Magazine, a prominent metal magazine, has a hall of fame for albums it considers "extreme music's most important albums. Lamb of Gods 2004 album Ashes of the Wake was inducted in 2021.

Year	Nominee / work	Award	Result
2021	Ashes of the Wake	Decibel Hall of Fame	Inducted

== Heavy Music Awards ==
The Heavy Music Awards (HMAs) are awards presented by The Heavy Group to recognize outstanding achievements in heavy music. Lamb of God has received one nomination.

Year	Nominee / work	Award	Result
2021	Lamb of God	Best International Band	Nominated

== Kerrang! Awards ==
The Kerrang! Awards is an annual awards ceremony held by Kerrang!, a British rock magazine. Lamb of God have received one nominations.

Year	Nominee / work	Award	Result
2009	Lamb of God	Best International Band	Nominated

== Grammy Awards ==
The annual Grammy Awards are presented by the National Academy of Recording Arts and Sciences. Lamb of God have received five nominations.

Year	Nominee / work	Award	Result
2007	"Redneck"	Best Metal Performance	Nominated
2010	"Set to Fail"	Best Metal Performance	Nominated
2011	"In Your Words"	Best Metal Performance	Nominated
2013	"Ghost Walking"	Best Hard Rock/Metal Performance	Nominated
2016	"512"	Best Metal Performance	Nominated

== Loudwire Music Awards ==
Loudwire is an American hard rock and heavy metal online magazine. Annual Loudwire Awards were given to the public vote winners in multiple categories. Lamb of God have received one award from nine nominations.

Year	Nominee / work	Award	Result
2012	Resolution	Metal Album of the Year	Won
2012	Lamb of God	Metal Band of the Year	Nominated
2012	"Ghost Walking"	Metal Song of the Year	Nominated
2012	Randy Blythe	Male Vocalist of the Year	Nominated
2013	Randy Blythe	Rock Titan of the Year	Nominated
2015	VII: Sturm und Drang	Metal Album of the Year	Nominated
2015	"512"	Best Metal Song	Nominated
2015	Lamb of God	Best Metal Band of the Year	Nominated
2015	Randy Blythe	Male Vocalist of the Year	Nominated

== Metal Hammer Golden Gods Awards ==
The Metal Hammer Golden Gods Awards is an annual awards ceremony held by Metal Hammer, a British heavy metal magazine. Lamb of God have received five awards from nine nominations.

Year	Nominee / work	Award	Result
2004	Lamb of God	Best Underground Act	Nominated
2007	Lamb of God	Best Live Band	Won
2007	Lamb of God	Best International Band	Nominated
2007	Sacrament	Album of the Year	Nominated
2007	Willie Alder & Mark Morton	Shredder	Nominated
2009	Lamb of God	Best International Band	Nominated
2009	Wrath	Best Album	Won
2010	Lamb of God	Best International Band	Won
2012	Lamb of God	Best International Band	Won
2016	Lamb of God	Best Live Band	Won

== Metalstorm Awards ==
Metal Storm Awards is an annual awards ceremony held by Metal Storm, an Estonia-based heavy metal webzine. Since 2005 Lamb of God received one award from four nominations in multiple categories.

Year	Nominee / work	Award	Result
2006	Sacrament	Best Trash Metal Album	Nominated
2009	Wrath	Best Trash Metal Album	Nominated
2012	Resolution	The Best Hardcore / Metalcore / Deathcore Album	Nominated
2015	VII: Sturm und Drang	Best Thrash Metal Album	Won

== Modern Drummer Awards ==
The Modern Drummer Awards is an annual awards ceremony held by Modern Drummer, Lamb of God Drummer Chris Alder won best metal drummer four times throughout his tenure with the band.

Year	Nominee / work	Award	Result
2007	Chris Adler	Best Metal Drummer	Won
2011	Chris Adler	Best Metal Drummer	Won
2012	Chris Adler	Best Metal Drummer	Won
2014	Chris Adler	Best Metal Drummer	Won

== Revolver Golden Gods Awards ==
The Revolver Golden Gods Awards are awarded annually by the American music magazine Revolver. Lamb of God received nine nominations.

Year	Nominee / work	Award	Result
2010	Lamb of God	Best Live Band	Nominated
2012	Chris Adler	Best Drummer	Nominated
2012	Willie Adler and Mark Morton	Best Guitarists	Nominated
2012	"Resolution"	Album of the Year	Nominated
2013	Lamb of God	Best Live Band	Nominated
2014	Lamb of God	Best Live Band	Nominated
2014	"As the Palaces Burn"	Best Film & Video presented by Eagle Rock Entertainment	Nominated

== Revolver Magazine Awards ==
Revolver in a U.S. based heavy metal music and hard rock that occasionally gives out awards Lamb of God has won three.

Year	Nominee / work	Award	Result
2003	As the Palaces Burn	Album of the Year	Won
2006	Sacrament	Album of the Year	Won
2011	Randy Blythe	Revolver Magazine's 100 Greatest Living Rock Stars	Won

== Rock Sound Hall of Fame ==
Rock Sound inducted numerous albums into its Hall of Fame, as part of a long-running feature. The main criterion for inclusion was thought to be influence – even within a particular genre – and for that reason many of the albums have been commercially successful as well as critically successful because they have then gone on to influence large numbers of bands or the music scene.

Year	Nominee / work	Award	Result
2013	As the Places Burn	Rock Sound Hall of Fame	Inducted

== Spike Guys' Choice Awards ==
The Spike Guys Choice Awards was an awards show produced by the Viacom cable channel Spike from 2007 to 2016. The winners were originally chosen based on voting by the channel's fans and viewers until 2015, when the show started presenting the honorees.

Year	Nominee / work	Award	Result
2007	Lamb of God	Ballsiest Band	Nominated
