= Killadelphia =

Killadelphia is a slang reference to the city of Philadelphia due to high crime rates in the city. It may also refer to:

- Killadelphia (album), a 2004 album by Lamb of God
- Killadelphia (comics), a comic series written by Rodney Barnes with art by Jason Shawn Alexander
- Killadelphia (video album), a 2005 DVD by Lamb of God
- Killadelphia: More Bodies than Days, a 2007 mixtape by rapper Young Chris
