= Killadelphia (video) =

Video by Lamb of God
- Released: 2005
- Recorded: October 17, 2004 (Live Concert)
- Venue: Trocadero Theatre
- Genre: Groove metal
- Length: 1:57:00
- Label: Epic Records
- Director: Doug Spangenberg

Lamb of God chronology
Terror and Hubris (2003)	Killadelphia (2005)	Walk With Me In Hell (2008)

Killadelphia is the second video album by American heavy metal band Lamb of God, released on Epic Records and shot and directed by Doug Spangenberg. It consists of footage filmed during the band's two gigs at the Trocadero Theatre in Philadelphia on October 16 and 17, 2004, hence the pun title of the DVD. In addition to the concert footage lasting more than 70 minutes, Killadelphia includes over 2 hours of behind-the-scenes footage recorded throughout the Ashes of the Wake Tour. Also included are three music videos, including the uncensored version of "Now You've Got Something To Die For" and a demo version of "Laid To Rest". Killadelphia reached platinum status in the United States in 2007.

On December 13, 2005, Killadelphia was re-released with an audio CD version of the live concert included in the DVD package.

== Track listing ==
1. Intro
2. "Laid to Rest"
3. On the Road
4. "Hourglass"
5. Goddamn!
6. "As the Palaces Burn"
7. Late to Denver
8. "Now You've Got Something to Die For"
9. I'm Not Willie!
10. "11th Hour"
11. "Terror and Hubris in the House of Frank Pollard"
12. The Brandy and Randy Show
13. "Ruin"
14. Wine Soundcheck
15. "Omerta"
16. Death from Above
17. "Pariah"
18. We've Gone Completely Batty!
19. "The Faded Line"
20. English Coffee
21. "Bloodletting"
22. Adventures in the UK
23. "The Subtle Arts of Murder And Persuasion"
24. Glasgow
25. "Vigil"
26. Afterthoughts
27. "What I've Become"
28. Wrap-up
29. "Black Label"
30. Outro / Credits

== Music videos ==
1. Laid to Rest (Demo Version)
2. Laid to Rest
3. Now You've Got Something to Die For

== Personnel ==
Lamb of God

- Randy Blythe - vocals
- Mark Morton - lead guitar
- Willie Adler - rhythm guitar
- John Campbell - bass
- Chris Adler - drums

Video Crew

- Doug Spangenberg - direction/production/editing
- Anderson Bradshaw, Robbie Tassaro - editing

Audio Crew

- Machine - audio mixing
- Dan Korneff - editing, sound design
- Mike Roze and Machine - surround mixing

== Certifications ==
Region	Certification	Certified units/sales
Australia (ARIA)	Gold	7,500^{^}
Canada (Music Canada)	Platinum	10,000^{^}
United States (RIAA)	Platinum	100,000^{^}
^{^} Shipments figures based on certification alone.
