= Anesthetic (album) =

Studio album by Mark Morton
- Released: March 1, 2019
- Recorded: 2017–2018
- Studio: Hybrid Studios (Santa Ana, California, US); NRG Studios (North Hollywood, California, US); The Magpie Cage (Baltimore, Maryland, US); The Mill Studio (Cayman Islands)
- Genre: Hard rock
- Length: 42:38
- Label: Spinefarm
- Producer: Mark Morton; Josh Wilbur; Jake Oni

Mark Morton chronology
Anesthetic (2019)	Ether (2020)

Singles from Anesthetic
- 1. "The Truth Is Dead" Released: December 14, 2018; 2. "Cross Off" Released: January 8, 2019; 3. "Save Defiance" Released: February 22, 2019

Anesthetic is the first solo album by American guitarist Mark Morton, released on March 1, 2019, via Spinefarm.

== Background ==
The album features guest performances by Jacoby Shaddix of Papa Roach, Myles Kennedy of Alter Bridge, Chuck Billy of Testament, Mark Lanegan, Josh Todd of Buckcherry, Alissa White-Gluz of Arch Enemy, the late Chester Bennington of Linkin Park, Jake Oni of Oni and Randy Blythe of Lamb of God. According to Morton, he had been writing new material for his solo record for "quite some time".

== Sound and composition ==
Mark Morton outlined the difference between his solo album and his work with Lamb of God:

[Anesthetic is] just a little more rock than the music that I guess I'm more traditionally known for with LAMB OF GOD, which is kind of like a thrash metal band, extreme metal. The solo project, it kind of digs into my influences in terms of classic rock and blues rock. It's still hard rock, heavy rock, but it's just not quite as LAMB; it's a little more melodic. I guess a little more conventionally arranged. It just kind of explores my love of hard rock music. The songs themselves are collaborations with a pretty extensive list of artists that I admire as a fan or as a friend or both. I really worked with a large number of people. Most LAMB OF GOD albums are typically done with the band and the producer, so there's six people's input. This album was myself and my producer kind of mainly being the creative directors, then we had all this input from these amazing artists that we brought into the fold. It's very collaborative, diverse and dynamic in that sense. The inspiration, I really had these rock songs that I was writing on my own just in the course of my songwriting, what I do. I had these songs piling up and accumulating that clearly weren't appropriate to submit as LAMB OF GOD material, but were songs that I thought were worth developing. We took that ball and ran with it."

== Release ==
The first single, "The Truth Is Dead", was released on December 13, 2018, premiering on SiriusXM Liquid Metal. The song features Morton's Lamb of God bandmate Randy Blythe and Arch Enemy frontwoman Alissa White-Gluz on vocals.

The second single off the record, "Cross Off", which features Chester Bennington, debuted at number 18 on the US Billboard Hard Rock Digital Song Sales with 2,000 downloads and 209,000 streams in its first week. A music video for "Cross Off" was released on March 5, directed by Roboshobo. The music video for "Cross Off" features an empty microphone as a tribute to Bennington, who died in 2017.

== Reception ==
Wall of Sound gave the album a 7/10 and stated: "On the one hand he has nabbed some great artists to assist him get this album a release, however I think he has missed the mark on half the tracks by playing along with the Lamb of God playbook too often."

== Track listing ==
Anesthetic track listing
No.	Title	Writer(s)	Length
1.	"Cross Off" (featuring Chester Bennington)	Mark Morton; Josh Wilbur; Bennington; Jake Oni	4:14
2.	"Sworn Apart" (featuring Jacoby Shaddix)	Morton; Wilbur; Shaddix	3:57
3.	"Axis" (featuring Mark Lanegan)	Morton; Lanegan	4:13
4.	"The Never" (featuring Chuck Billy and Jake Oni)	Morton; Wilbur; Oni	4:06
5.	"Save Defiance" (featuring Myles Kennedy)	Morton; Wilbur; Kennedy	4:37
6.	"Blur" (featuring Mark Morales)	Morton; Wilbur; Mike Inez	5:21
7.	"Back from the Dead" (featuring Josh Todd)	Morton; Wilbur; Todd	4:03
8.	"Reveal" (featuring Naeemah Maddox)	Morton; Maddox; Yanni Papadopoulis; Jean-Paul Gaster; Chris Brooks	4:12
9.	"Imaginary Days"	Morton; Wilbur; Morales	3:45
10.	"The Truth Is Dead" (featuring Randy Blythe and Alissa White-Gluz)	Morton; Wilbur; Blythe; White-Gluz	4:13
Total length:			42:38

== Personnel ==
- Mark Morton – guitars (all tracks), bass (track 2), vocals (on "Imaginary Days")

Additional vocalists

- Chester Bennington – vocals (track 1)
- Jacoby Shaddix – vocals (track 2)
- Mark Lanegan – vocals (track 3)
- Chuck Billy – vocals (track 4)
- Jake Oni – vocals (track 4)
- Myles Kennedy – vocals (track 5), backing vocals (track 2)
- Mark Morales – vocals (track 6), backing vocals (track 9)
- Josh Todd – vocals (track 7)
- Naeemah Maddox – vocals (track 8)
- Randy Blythe – vocals (track 10)
- Alissa White-Gluz – vocals (track 10)

Additional instrumentalists

- Paolo Gregoletto – bass (track 1)
- Alex Bent – drums (tracks 1, 2)
- Marc Ford – guitars (track 3)
- Mike Inez – bass (tracks 3, 5-7, 9)
- Steve Gorman – drums (tracks 3, 6)
- David Ellefson – bass (tracks 4, 10)
- Roy Mayorga – drums (tracks 4, 7, 10)
- Ray Luzier – drums (tracks 5, 9)
- Yanni Papadopoulos – bass (track 8)
- Jean-Paul Gaster – drums (track 8)
- Chris Brooks – keyboards (track 8)

Production

- Josh Wilbur – producer, engineering, mixing
- Mark Morton – producer (track 8)
- Jake Oni – executive producer
- Jay Robbins – engineering (additional)
- Paul Suarez – engineering (additional)
- Roy Mayorga – engineering (additional)
- Brad Blackwood – mastering
- Daniel Danger – artwork, art direction

== Charts ==
Chart performance for Anesthetic
Chart (2019)	Peak position
Australian Albums (ARIA)	97
Swiss Albums (Schweizer Hitparade)	98
UK Rock & Metal Albums (OCC)	8
