= Sons of Texas =

American rock band

- Origin: McAllen, Texas, U.S.
- Genres: Hard rock, heavy metal, southern rock
- Years active: 2013–2021
- Labels: Razor & Tie, Warhorse
- Past members: Mark Morales; Mike Villarreal; Nick Villarreal; Jon Olivarez; Jes DeHoyos
- Website: thesonsoftexas.com

Sons of Texas was an American rock band formed in McAllen, Texas in 2013. They released their debut album Baptized in the Rio Grande in 2015.

== History ==
Sons of Texas was formed in McAllen, Texas in 2013. Shortly thereafter, the band was signed to Razor & Tie and entered the studio with producer Josh Wilbur (Lamb of God, All That Remains, Hatebreed). The music video for the first official track from the band, "Baptized in the Rio Grande", premiered via Revolver's website on January 6, 2015.

The band released their debut album Baptized in the Rio Grande on March 3, 2015, in digital and physical format. The first single "Baptized in the Rio Grande" peaked at No. 29 on the Mainstream Rock Songs chart. They released their second album, Forged by Fortitude, on September 22, 2017.

In between the release of Forged by Fortitude and their next studio session in 2018, Mark Morales was tapped by Mark Morton of Lamb of God to provide vocals on his solo album.

In 2019, working without a record label, Sons of Texas headed back to the studios in San Antonio, Texas, to release a three-song extended play titled Resurgence. Due to the COVID-19 pandemic, the band used the time to release another EP, As the Crow Flies, in September 2020.

On December 10, 2021, Mike, Nick and Jon announced via their social media that they had left the group. The following day, Jes announced via the Sons of Texas Instagram page his exit from and the end of the group. No statement has been made publicly by Mark Morales.

== Band members ==
- Mark Morales – lead vocals (2013-2021)
- Jes DeHoyos – lead guitar, backing vocals (2013–2021)

- Jon Olivarez – rhythm guitar (2013–2021)
- Nick "Rat" Villarreal – bass (2013–2021)
- Mike Villarreal – drums (2013–2021)

== Discography ==
=== Studio albums ===
Title	Year	Label	Chart positions			
Title	Year	Label	Top 200	Heatseekers Albums	US Rock	US Hard Rock
Baptized in the Rio Grande	2015	Razor & Tie	143	5	36	10
Forged by Fortitude	2017	New Razor & Tie Enterprises				

=== Extended plays ===
Title	Year	Label
Resurgence	2019	Warhorse Studios
As the Crow Flies	2020	Warhorse Studios

=== CD singles ===
Title	Year	Label
"Blameshift"	2016	Razor & Tie
"Beneath the Riverbed/Ball and Chain"	2016	Razor & Tie
"Under the Gun"	2020	Warhorse Studios
