= Resolution (Lamb of God album) =

Studio album by Lamb of God
- Released: January 24, 2012
- Recorded: February–May 2011
- Studios: Spin Recording Studios in New York City; Studio Barbarosa in Port Hayward, Virginia; New England School of Communications in Bangor, Maine
- Genres: Groove metal; thrash metal; metalcore
- Length: 56:21
- Labels: Epic; Roadrunner
- Producer: Josh Wilbur

Lamb of God chronology
Hourglass: The Anthology (2010)	Resolution (2012)	VII: Sturm und Drang (2015)

Singles from Resolution
- 1. "Ghost Walking" Released: December 11, 2011

Resolution is the sixth studio album by American heavy metal band Lamb of God. It is available on a single disc CD or a two-disc deluxe edition.

== Information ==
The album was produced and mixed by Josh Wilbur as was the previous album. The main difference with previous records is that its writing process started before they ended touring on Wrath, and started in hotel rooms on a laptop.

For this album lead singer Randy Blythe stated he recorded the album completely sober, as he had struggled with alcoholism in the past. He stated that his sobriety contributed to his "ferocious" and more controlled vocal performance on the album.

Besides the normal edition a two disc was available in the UK to pre-order for a limited time, containing a bonus 12-track live album entitled "Wrath – Tour 2009/2010," which was only available through Amazon.co.uk, Play.com and HMV. The lead single, entitled "Ghost Walking", was released on December 5, 2011. The album debuted at number 3 on the Billboard 200 and number 1 on the Rock Chart. The album sold around 52,000 copies in the U.S. during the first week of release. The album has sold 161,000 copies in the US as of June 2015.

The iTunes edition comes with two bonus tracks, the first is an exclusive track titled "Digital Sands" and the second is a live version of the song "Vigil" originally from the album As the Palaces Burn.

The Japanese edition also comes with an exclusive track, "Bury Me Under the Sun".

== Reception ==
Resolution received mostly positive reviews. On Metacritic, the album attained an overall score of 72 out of 100, based on 18 reviews from professional critics. Rick Florino of Artistdirect gave the album 5 out of 5 stars stating that it was "Lamb of God at their finest." Carla Gillis of Now Magazine gave it three out of five stars and said, "Resolution is as aggressive as ever, no mean feat for a band seven albums in, and rife with memorable riffs ("Desolation," "The Undertow," "Barbarosa"). There are new proggier and acoustic bits ("Ghost Walking") on display."

== Track listing ==
All tracks are written by Lamb of God.

No.	Title	Length
1.	"Straight for the Sun"	2:28
2.	"Desolation"	3:54
3.	"Ghost Walking"	4:30
4.	"Guilty"	3:24
5.	"The Undertow"	4:46
6.	"The Number Six"	5:21
7.	"Barbarosa" (instrumental)	1:35
8.	"Invictus"	4:12
9.	"Cheated"	2:35
10.	"Insurrection"	4:51
11.	"Terminally Unique"	4:21
12.	"To the End"	3:49
13.	"Visitation"	3:59
14.	"King Me"	6:36
Total length:		56:21

Note

- The Latin verse lyrics on "King Me" are credited to Wolfgang Amadeus Mozart, the rest of the lyrics are credited to Randy Blythe.

Japanese edition bonus track
No.	Title	Length
15.	"Bury Me Under the Sun"	4:36
Total length:		60:57

iTunes bonus tracks
No.	Title	Length
16.	"Digital Sands"	4:01
17.	"Vigil" (live)	5:37
Total length:		70:35

2024 Extended Edition bonus tracks
No.	Title	Length
15.	"Digital Sands"	4:01
16.	"Bury Me Under The Sun"	4:36
17.	"Hit The Wall"	4:35
Total length:		69:33

UK limited-edition pre-order bonus live album: Wrath – Tour 2009/2010
No.	Title	Length
1.	"The Passing"	2:08
2.	"In Your Words"	5:20
3.	"Set to Fail"	4:33
4.	"Walk with Me in Hell"	5:17
5.	"Hourglass"	3:57
6.	"Now You've Got Something to Die For"	4:15
7.	"Vigil"	5:37
8.	"Ruin"	4:12
9.	"As The Palaces Burn"	3:04
10.	"Blacken The Cursed Sun"	5:24
11.	"Laid To Rest"	4:47
12.	"Redneck"	4:16
13.	"Black Label"	5:46
Total length:		58:36

== Credits ==
Writing, performance and production credits are adapted from the album liner notes.

=== Personnel ===
==== Lamb of God ====
- Randy Blythe – vocals
- Mark Morton – guitar
- Willie Adler – guitar
- John Campbell – bass
- Chris Adler – drums

==== Additional musicians ====
- Amanda Munton – vocals on "King Me"
- Bryan Crook – orchestration on "King Me"

==== Production ====
- Josh Wilbur – production, engineering, mixing
- Paul Suarez – engineering
- UE Nastasi – mastering

==== Artwork and design ====
- Ken Adams – art direction
- Dustin Couch – photography
- Brian Feeley – photography

=== Studios ===
- Spin Recording Studios, New York City, US – recording
- Studio Barbarosa, Port Hayward, Virginia, US – recording
- New England School of Communications, Bangor, Maine, US – recording (Munton's vocals)
- Sterling Sound, New York City, US – mastering

== Charts ==
=== Weekly charts ===
Chart (2012)	Peak position
Australian Albums (ARIA)	3
Austrian Albums (Ö3 Austria)	28
Belgian Albums (Ultratop Flanders)	61
Belgian Albums (Ultratop Wallonia)	70
Canadian Albums (Billboard)	2
Danish Albums (Hitlisten)	20
Dutch Albums (Album Top 100)	36
Finnish Albums (Suomen virallinen lista)	5
French Albums (SNEP)	115
German Albums (Offizielle Top 100)	37
Irish Albums (IRMA)	41
Japanese Albums (Oricon)	56
South Korean Albums (Circle)	70
South Korean International Albums (Circle)	13
New Zealand Albums (RMNZ)	12
Norwegian Albums (VG-lista)	19
Scottish Albums (Official Charts)	15
Spanish Albums (Promusicae)	79
Swedish Albums (Sverigetopplistan)	21
Swiss Albums (Schweizer Hitparade)	30
UK Albums (Official Charts)	19
UK Rock & Metal Albums (Official Charts)	1
US Billboard 200	3
US Digital Albums (Billboard)	4
US Top Hard Rock Albums (Billboard)	1
US Top Rock Albums (Billboard)	1
US Indie Store Album Sales (Billboard)	1

=== Year-end charts ===
Chart (2012)	Position
US Top Rock Albums (Billboard)	60
