= Killadelphia (album) =

Live album by Lamb of God
- Released: December 13, 2005
- Recorded: Trocadero Theatre, Philadelphia, October 16, 2004
- Genres: Groove metal, metalcore
- Length: 67:02
- Label: Epic
- Director: Doug Spangenberg
- Producer: Lamb of God

Lamb of God chronology
Ashes of the Wake (2004)	Killadelphia (2005)	Sacrament (2006)

Professional ratings
Review scores
Source	Rating
AllMusic	3.5/5 stars
Blabbermouth.net	8/10
Collector's Guide to Heavy Metal	8/10

Killadelphia is a live album by American heavy metal band Lamb of God in Philadelphia, October 2004, which was released by Epic Records as a DVD. It includes the entire unabridged audio from the concert documented in the DVD of the same name. The CD was released on December 13, 2005, available with a special re-release version of the DVD or by itself in conventional CD packaging.

It was mixed by Machine, who also produced Lamb of God's Ashes of the Wake and Sacrament studio albums. The concert itself features songs from the band's first three studio albums, and even a song from the band's previous incarnation, Burn the Priest. Because it is a complete audio version of the concert, the CD is almost 70 minutes long and the transitions between tracks are seamless.

== Track listing ==
All tracks are written by Lamb of God.

No.	Title	Length
1.	"Intro"	2:03
2.	"Laid to Rest"	3:50
3.	"Hourglass"	3:48
4.	"As the Palaces Burn"	3:28
5.	"Now You've Got Something to Die For"	3:39
6.	"11th Hour"	3:46
7.	"Terror & Hubris in the House of Frank Pollard"	6:33
8.	"Ruin"	3:57
9.	"Omerta"	4:48
10.	"Pariah"	5:14
11.	"The Faded Line"	4:41
12.	"Bloodletting"	2:17
13.	"The Subtle Arts of Murder & Persuasion"	4:39
14.	"Vigil"	5:01
15.	"What I've Become"	4:23
16.	"Black Label"	4:57
Total length:		67:02
