= Redneck (song) =

Single by Lamb of God

from the album Sacrament
- Released: June 2006
- Recorded: 2006
- Genre: Groove metal
- Length: 3:40
- Label: Epic
- Songwriters: John Campbell; Chris Adler; Randy Blythe; Mark Morton; Willie Adler
- Producer: Machine

Lamb of God singles chronology
"Now You've Got Something to Die For" (2005)	"Redneck" (2006)	"Walk with Me in Hell" (2006)

"Redneck" is the first single from the heavy metal band Lamb of God, from their fifth album Sacrament. A music video was also produced for the song. Vocalist Randy Blythe described the song's meaning in an interview with the magazine Metal Hammer:

Generally, it's not about any one person in particular. It's about people in the music industry whose egos become needlessly inflated and they show it. It's a general song. It's applicable to anyone in their life. If a fan thinks, "Oh, well, this guy is a prick," go ahead and take it and make it yours.

When writing the songs riff guitarist Mark Morton stated that he was trying to bring "blues-influenced, Southern swagger into metal."

It appeared as Brian Posehn's introductory song on the Comedy Central "Roast of Bob Saget" and is featured on the track listing of THQ's Saints Row 2, EA Sports Big's NFL Street 3, DLC for Rock Band 4, and SCEA's ATV Offroad Fury 4 video games.

On November 19, 2026, "Redneck" became the band’s first song to be certified platinum by the RIAA.

== Music video ==
The music video begins with a young girl named Mary Jane, whose birthday is near: her mother decides that this year instead of her father playing music, they should "hire some professional entertainment" and looks at the yellow pages for a band. The band ad she sees is Lamb of God's and, thinking they are a Christian band due to the name, she hires them. The next scene is a nice suburban birthday party for small children, one that is abruptly disturbed and eventually ruined as Lamb of God's tour bus arrives, full of marijuana and scantily clad groupies. The band and crew make themselves at home, trashing everything in their way, and continue to set up a stage, regardless of the obvious displeasure of the neighborhood. The band then plays the rest of the song on stage, causing everyone except little Mary to flee from the aggressive metal sound. The video ends with the singer Randy Blythe falling unconscious into a kiddie pool and Mary laughing.

Guitarist Mark Morton stated that the music video was inspired by 1980s music videos from bands such as Twisted Sister.

In November 2021, Lamb of God released a short documentary showing the process of making the songs music video.

== Reception ==
"Redneck" is widely regarded as one of the band's best songs. In 2012, Loudwire ranked the song number three on their list of the 10 greatest Lamb of God songs, and number 20 on their list of the Top 21st Century Metal Song. In 2020, Kerrang ranked the song number two on their list of the 20 greatest Lamb of God songs. The song was nominated for the Grammy Award for Best Metal Performance at the Grammy Awards of 2007.

Metal Hammer wrote "can you imagine a Lamb Of God gig without this? Redneck rules because it manages to be both a celebratory sing-along and a thoroughly vicious, turbo-thrash neck-wrecker, custom built for the kind of pits that only the brave or the foolish would enter."

== Track listing ==
1. "Redneck" (album version) – 3:40
2. "Redneck" (edited version) – 3:41
3. "Omerta" (live) – 4:48
4. "Black Label" (live) – 4:57

== Certifications ==
Region	Certification	Certified units/sales
United States (RIAA)	Platinum	1,000,000^{‡}
^{‡} Sales+streaming figures based on certification alone.
