= Ashes of the Wake =

Studio album by Lamb of God
- Released: August 31, 2004
- Studios: Sound of Music, Richmond, Virginia; Water Music Studios, Hoboken, New Jersey
- Genres: Thrash metal; metalcore; groove metal; death metal
- Length: 47:42
- Labels: Epic; Prosthetic (EK 90702)
- Producers: Machine; Lamb of God

Lamb of God chronology
As the Palaces Burn (2003)	Ashes of the Wake (2004)	Killadelphia (2005)

Singles from Ashes of the Wake
- 1. "Laid to Rest" Released: August 14, 2004; 2. "Now You've Got Something to Die For" Released: October 4, 2004

Professional ratings
Review scores
Source	Rating
AllMusic	4/5 stars
Blabbermouth.net	7/10
Collector's Guide to Heavy Metal	8/10
Entertainment Weekly	B+
Kerrang!	3/5 stars
PopMatters	favorable
Ultimate Guitar	8.5/10
Metal Injection	9/10

Ashes of the Wake is the third studio album and first major-label release by American heavy metal band Lamb of God, released in 2004 via Epic Records. The album debuted at number 27 on the Billboard 200, selling 35,000 copies in its first week and being rated by Guitar World as the 49th greatest Guitar Album of all Time. This album also was rated by Metal Hammer as the 5th greatest Metal Album of The 21st Century. As of August 2010, Ashes of the Wake has sold 398,000 copies in the United States. Ten years after its release, as of 2014, sales have topped 400,000 copies sold, making it Lamb of God’s best-selling record. The album was certified gold by the Recording Industry Association of America in February 2016.

== Background and promotion ==
Ashes of the Wake marked Lamb of God’s major label debut. The band did not have much time in between their previous release, As the Places Burn, and Ashes of the Wake. This was due to Epic Records signing the band shortly after the release of As the Places Burn in 2003, and wanting the band to release a follow up soon after. Commenting on the quick turnaround between albums, guitarist Mark Morton stated:

We didn’t have a whole lot of time to write new songs, it felt like a lot of pressure to deliver what was going to be a very important record for us very quickly. I think that’d be the only negative memory because of the pressure there; but at the same time, I think it was a good exercise for us as a band – for myself as an artist, just to learn that we could live up to that standard, we could operate at that level.

Many of the songs on the album started off with the guitar riffs that Willie Adler and Morton wrote. They would then bring the demos to the rest of the band and put it all together, with the lyrics coming last.

On May 17, 2004, Lamb of God announced the title of the album. The first single, "Laid to Rest", was released on August 14, 2004, accompanied by an official music video. The video ended up getting heavy playtime on both Headbangers Ball and Fuse.

The album was released on August 31, 2004 and sold 35,000 copies in its first week, becoming the band's first album to reach the Billboard 200, peaking at number 27.

The band supported Ashes of the Wake with extensive touring, including a second stage slot on Ozzfest in 2004 along with being headliners in the US and Europe, including the 2005 Sounds of the Underground tour.

== Lyrical themes ==
Several songs on the album were inspired by the events that took place during the war in Iraq and in Afghanistan, with songs such as "Ashes of the Wake" (which includes snippets of former Marine Staff Sergeant Jimmy Massey in an interview after his return from the Iraq War), "Now You've Got Something to Die For", "One Gun", and "The Faded Line" criticizing the war and the George W. Bush administration.

"One Gun" was inspired by Nas' song "One Mic", with guitarist Mark Morton explaining, "I remember thinking, If you can change the world with one mic, you can definitely change it with one gun." "Omerta" addresses organized crime, with the title and intro quote drawing from the Sicilian Mafia's code of silence. "Break You" is about tensions between band members.

== Releases ==
The first pressing came with a bonus disc titled "Pure American Metal", including songs taken from the band's previous albums (Burn the Priest, New American Gospel and As the Palaces Burn), a live recording of the song "Black Label" from DVD Terror and Hubris, as well as a pre-production demo of the song "Laid to Rest".

The Japanese edition included a bonus song "Another Nail for Your Coffin" which was released worldwide in 2010 in a three-CD box set called Hourglass: The Anthology. The song was later included on the 15th anniversary edition of the album.

A DualDisc version was released in the United States. The DVD side contained the album in LPCM 2.0, and Dolby Digital 5.1 surround sound, as well as various video clips, including the promo videos for "Now You've Got Something to Die For" (intended to promote the Killadelphia release) and "Laid to Rest", a short on the New England Metalfest, a "Meet the Band" and a clip from the Terror and Hubris DVD. A production error in the 5.1 mix of "Break You" causes the vocals to be displaced throughout the track, and pitch shift high and low throughout the song. This error is also in the Dolby Atmos mix on Apple Music.

On August 30, 2024, Lamb released a 20th anniversary deluxe addition of the album. It featured new remixes by HEALTH, Justin K Broadrick (Godflesh and Jesu), Kublai Khan TX, and Malevolence, along with demo and live versions of tracks from the album. In the Summer of 2024 Lamb of God went on a co headlining tour with Mastodon with both bands celebrating 20th anniversaries for their albums Ashes of the Wake and Leviathan. Both albums were played in full at each concert.

== Reception ==
The album was generally well received; Blabbermouth.net gave it a 7 rating. Johnny Loftus of AllMusic gave it a 4 out of 5 star rating. He praised Blythe's vocals, saying they became, "Lamb of God's threshold of pain conduit." In a review by Ultimate Guitar they wrote “Blythe is what really sets this band apart from other metalcore bands out there, his scream and his growls have his distinctive sound. Only a few bands have their own original sound to the screams. Blythe is a great lyricist in my opinion, very political and it does make you think. But only a few lines will stick with you.” Entertainment Weekly writer Elisabeth Vincentelli also gave the album a positive review stating “Singer Randy Blythe nimbly but ferociously rips apart the lies that leaders tell and assails imperial bloodlust, while the band unleashes an intricate, brutal barrage of riffs and blast beats. By the end, you feel clobbered -- and oddly empowered.”

In a retrospective review by Kevin Stewart of Decibel he wrote "Ashes of the Wake is Lamb of God’s most significant pivot point. It was the album where they made the biggest leap in terms of understanding what goes on in boardrooms and behind the mixing board. It also saw them take the life-altering plunge into the world of being full-time, professional musicians. Nothing would be the same, and for all the indelible changes it made in the lives of vocalist Randy Blythe, guitarists Willie Adler and Mark Morton, bassist John Campbell and then-drummer Chris Adler—as well as the enduring imprint it’s made in the name of American metal."

In 2021, Eli Enis of Revolver included the song "Laid to Rest" in his list of the "15 Greatest Album-Opening Songs in Metal". The publication also dubbed it the bands best album that same year writing "More than just Lamb of God’s finest work, Ashes of the Wake is quite possibly the greatest metal album of the 2000s. Musically, the group struck the perfect balance between death metal bite and stadium-ready grandiosity, as earth-shattering anthems like “Omerta,” “Hourglass” and “Laid to Rest” execute so swiftly. Lyrically, it hits even harder." Metal Hammer also dubbed it the bands best album in their 2026, ranking.

=== Accolades ===
Publication	Country	Accolade	Year	Rank
Guitar World	US	50 greatest guitar albums of all time	2009	49
Loudwire	US	Top Ten Best Albums of 2004	2014	4
Metal Hammer	UK	The 100 greatest metal albums of the 21st century	2018	5
Decibel	US	Decibel Hall of Fame	2021	NR
Loudwire	US	The 100 Best Rock + Metal Albums of the 21st Century	2023	29
Metal Hammer	UK	The 50 Best Metal Albums of the 2000s	2023	22
Loudwire	US	50 Best Metal Albums of the 2000s	2025	NR
Yardbarker	US	The 20 Greatest Heavy Metal Albums of the 21st Century So Far	2025	NR

== Track listing ==
All tracks are written by Randy Blythe, Willie Adler, Chris Adler, Mark Morton and John Campbell.

Ashes of the Wake track listing
No.	Title	Length
1.	"Laid to Rest"	3:50
2.	"Hourglass"	4:00
3.	"Now You've Got Something to Die For"	3:39
4.	"The Faded Line"	4:37
5.	"Omerta"	4:45
6.	"Blood of the Scribe"	4:23
7.	"One Gun"	3:59
8.	"Break You"	3:35
9.	"What I've Become"	3:28
10.	"Ashes of the Wake"	5:45
11.	"Remorse Is for the Dead"	5:41
Total length:		47:42

Japanese edition bonus track
No.	Title	Length
12.	"Another Nail for Your Coffin"	4:37

Pure American Metal (First pressing bonus disc)
No.	Title	Length
1.	"Bloodletting" (from Burn the Priest)	1:58
2.	"The Subtle Arts of Murder and Persuasion" (from New American Gospel)	4:10
3.	"11th Hour" (from As the Palaces Burn)	3:43
4.	"Black Label" (live, from Terror and Hubris)	4:37
5.	"Laid to Rest" (demo)	3:47

15th anniversary edition bonus tracks
No.	Title	Length
12.	"Another Nail for Your Coffin"	4:37
13.	"Laid to Rest" (demo)	3:47
14.	"Ashes of the Wake" (demo)	5:32
15.	"Remorse Is for the Dead" (demo)	4:20

20th anniversary edition bonus tracks
No.	Title	Length
12.	"Laid to Rest" (demo)	3:47
13.	"Ashes of the Wake" (demo)	5:32
14.	"Remorse is for the Dead" (demo)	4:20
15.	"Another Nail for Your Coffin" (featuring Kublai Khan TX & Malevolence)	4:00
16.	"Laid to Rest" (HEALTH Remix)	2:38
17.	"Omerta" (Justin K Broadrick Remix)	5:49
18.	"Remorse is for the Dead" (Live in Richmond, VA)	5:29
19.	"Now You've Got Something to Die For" (Live from '07)	3:41

== Personnel ==
Lamb of God

- Randy Blythe – vocals
- Mark Morton – guitar
- Willie Adler – guitar
- John Campbell – bass
- Chris Adler – drums

Additional musicians

- Alex Skolnick – second guitar solo on song "Ashes of the Wake"
- Chris Poland – third guitar solo on song "Ashes of the Wake"

Artwork

- Ken Adams – art direction, design
- Greg Watermann – photography

Production

- Machine – production, engineering, recording, mixing
- Lamb of God – production
- John Agnello – engineering
- Tony Schloff, Todd Parker, Dan Korneff – Pro Tools
- Ted Young, Al Weatherhead, Casey Martin, Jeremy Miller, and Cam DiNunzio – assisted Pro Tools
- Mark Wilder – mastering

== Charts ==
Chart (2004)	Peak position
UK Albums (Official Charts)	126
UK Rock & Metal Albums (Official Charts)	11
US Billboard 200	27

Chart (2025–2026)	Peak position
Greek Albums (IFPI)	48

== Certifications ==
Region	Certification	Certified units/sales
Canada (Music Canada)	Gold	50,000^{^}
United Kingdom (BPI)	Silver	60,000^{‡}
United States (RIAA)	Gold	500,000^{‡}
^{^} Shipments figures based on certification alone.^{‡} Sales+streaming figures based on certification alone.

== See also ==
- List of anti-war songs
