= Wrath (Lamb of God album) =

Studio album by Lamb of God
- Released: February 23, 2009
- Recorded: 2008
- Genres: Groove metal; thrash metal; metalcore
- Length: 44:43
- Labels: Epic; Roadrunner
- Producer: Josh Wilbur

Lamb of God chronology
Sacrament (2006)	Wrath (2009)	Hourglass: The Anthology (2010)

Singles from Wrath
- 1. "Contractor" Released: December 19, 2008; 2. "Set to Fail" Released: February 2, 2009

Wrath is the fifth studio album by American heavy metal band Lamb of God. It was internationally released on February 23, 2009 via Roadrunner Records in Europe, Japan and Australia, and on February 24, 2009 via Epic Records in the U.S and Canada. It peaked at number 2 on the Billboard 200, becoming the band's most successful album on the chart, and sold 68,000 units in the U.S. during its first week of release. As of 2010, it has sold over 202,000 copies in the United States.

== Background and production ==
In August, 2008, it was announced that the band had commenced work on the follow-up to Sacrament, and that it was expected to be released on February 24, 2009. Josh Wilbur was confirmed as the producer for the album. Wilbur takes the place of the band's previous producer, Machine, who worked with them on Ashes of the Wake and Sacrament.

The recording process of Wrath was made available for online viewing through the band's website, with two webcams installed in the studio (specifically in the drum room and mixing room).

A producer version of the album with 4 separate stems per song (vocals, guitars, bass, drums) is available on the bonus CD on the Limited Deluxe Edition of Wrath.

== Music and album direction ==
Speaking about the record, drummer Chris Adler stated:

"This album is going to surprise a lot of people. Typically bands that get to where we are in our career begin to slack off, smell the roses and regurgitate. We chose a different path. No one wants to hear another band member hyping a new record. Wrath needs no hype. We have topped ourselves and on February 24 (as 2009) you will feel it."

"We are excited to be changing things up this time and working with Josh. We've never stayed in one place too long, and the band's evolution continues. There is an aggressive shift in the material and our approach. The bar has been raised."

Guitarist Mark Morton was also quoted in an interview stating:

"We usually try to do something fresh every time. This one, I think, is deliberately a little more raw and more aggressive than Sacrament was. Sacrament was a really, really dynamic record on every level, and the songs were all over the place - it was also heavily produced. This one's really raw and real-sounding, from every angle, and we're celebrating imperfections on this record. We're choosing what takes stay on the record based more on their character and personality than how completely mechanically precise they are. It's more about vibe and attitude in the takes than it is about, 'Wow, that was perfect.' It's the perfect ones that get thrown away, because they're just too sterile."

"The guitar tones are a little cleaner than normal. We're kind of getting into this mind-set that clean is heavy. Clarity is a lot heavier than oversaturated. It's just real raw and natural and organic-sounding, which, in itself, is kind of revolutionary these days, when kids are making pro audio-sounding recordings in their dorm rooms, on their laptops, and cutting and pasting verses and choruses. It's no longer cutting edge to make a completely space-aged, robotic-sounding record. I think it's almost fresh now to make one that sounds like an actual band played it. Don't get me wrong - it still sounds airtight and rehearsed, because it is all those things. But it's just real."

== Release and promotion ==
On December 19, 2008, Lamb of God released the albums first single "Contractor," the second and final single "Set to Fail" was released on February 2, 2009. A music video for the song was later released. The album was officially released on February 23, 2009, and sold 68,000 units in its first week debuting at number two on the Billboard 200 making it their highest charting album to date. Domestically the album also reached number one on the US Top Hard Rock Albums, Top Rock Albums and the Indie Store Album Sales. Intentionally it became their first album to reach number one on the Canadian Albums chart and the UK Rock & Metal Albums chart.

Lamb of God held the Wrath Tour in support of the album which began on November 24, 2008, and lasted till November 21, 2010. The tour seen them play multiple headline dates world wide along with supporting Metallica on their World Magnetic Tour.

== Reception ==
Professional ratings
Aggregate scores
Source	Rating
Metacritic	74/100
Review scores
Source	Rating
About.com	4.5/5 stars
AllMusic	3/5 stars
The A.V. Club	A
Blabbermouth.net	8.5/10
Consequence of Sound	4/5 stars
Entertainment Weekly	B+
Kerrang!	4/5 stars
Los Angeles Times	2.5/4 stars
NME	8/10
PopMatters	6/10
Rock Sound	9/10
Rolling Stone	2/5 stars
Slant Magazine	4/5 stars

Initial critical response to Wrath was positive. At Metacritic, which assigns a normalized rating out of 100 to reviews from mainstream critics, the album has received an average score of 74, based on 14 reviews. The Los Angeles Times stated that Lamb of God "roots its best songs in a Motörhead swagger that makes the growly moments stickier and gives the stadium-sized choruses a hint of righteous evil." IGN gave it an 8 out of 10 and stated that the album's highlight is "the band's technical prowess, which is omnipresent. And Blythe leads the charge valiantly, with a passel of angry proclamations. While Lamb of God doesn't exactly reinvent the wheel this time out, this is an impressive album-meaning it should be taken as a whole, cohesive listening experience. That's the best way of soaking up all the nuances and subtleties that make Lamb of God a standout American-metal band." Spin gave it a six out of ten and stated: "The latest outburst of controlled aggression from these veteran Virginia metallurgists proves that consistency is a blessing and a curse. As always, the palm-muted jackhammer riffs and Randy Blythe's elastic denunciations of liars, hypocrites, and lying hypocrites are frightfully precise. [...] But primally satisfying as it is, the band's meat-and-taters thrash leaves one hungry for some Mastodon-style lateral thinking. Or not."

AllMusic has given it mixed comments, stating: "There's no denying the sheer "angry basement workout/summer garage weightlifting" potential that Wrath's perfectly acceptable 45-minute running time offers, but without a single hook that sticks around long enough to reel in the fish, all you've got is bait." Rolling Stone also gave a negative review on it, saying, "the fearsome fivesome opt for a somewhat varied but hardly visionary attack mode, occasionally lurching into a groove or tune. The song titles betray a cynicism over military and religious affairs, but growl-to-screech front-monster Randy Blythe never makes his anger coherent [...] Wrath opens and closes with spans of placid subtlety - a welcome touch that doesn't make up for all the raging roteness in between.

== Awards ==
In 2010, Lamb of God was nominated for a Grammy, at the 52nd Grammy Awards, for "Set To Fail" in the Best Metal Performance category, but lost out to Judas Priest's "Dissident Aggressor". In 2011, the band was nominated for a Grammy, at the 53rd Grammy Awards, for "In Your Words" in the Best Metal Performance category, but lost to Iron Maiden's "El Dorado".

The album won Best Album at the 2009 Metal Hammer Golden Gods Awards ceremony.

== Track listing ==
All tracks are written by Lamb of God.

No.	Title	Length
1.	"The Passing" (instrumental)	1:58
2.	"In Your Words"	5:25
3.	"Set to Fail"	3:46
4.	"Contractor"	3:22
5.	"Fake Messiah"	4:34
6.	"Grace"	3:55
7.	"Broken Hands"	3:53
8.	"Dead Seeds"	3:41
9.	"Everything to Nothing"	3:50
10.	"Choke Sermon"	3:21
11.	"Reclamation"	7:07
Total length:		44:43

Special Edition bonus tracks
No.	Title	Length
12.	"We Die Alone"	4:37
13.	"Shoulder of Your God"	5:52
Total length:		55:17

Japanese edition bonus tracks
No.	Title	Length
12.	"We Die Alone"	4:37
13.	"Shoulder of Your God"	5:52
14.	"Condemn the Hive"	3:41
Total length:		58:53

iTunes bonus track
No.	Title	Length
12.	"Now You've Got Something to Die For" (live at Download Festival 2007)	3:41
Total length:		48:24

== Personnel ==
=== Lamb of God ===
- Randy Blythe – vocals
- Mark Morton – guitar
- Willie Adler – guitar
- John Campbell – bass
- Chris Adler – drums

=== Additional personnel ===
- Produced and mixed by Josh Wilbur
- Engineered by Dave Holdredge, Paul Saurez
- Mastered by Brian Gardner

== Charts ==
Chart (2009)	Peak position
Australian Albums (ARIA)	8
Austrian Albums (Ö3 Austria)	53
Belgian Albums (Ultratop Flanders)	80
Canadian Albums (Billboard)	1
Dutch Albums (Album Top 100)	52
Finnish Albums (Suomen virallinen lista)	5
French Albums (SNEP)	137
German Albums (Offizielle Top 100)	61
Irish Albums (IRMA)	32
Japanese Albums (Oricon)	59
New Zealand Albums (RMNZ)	14
Norwegian Albums (VG-lista)	20
Scottish Albums (Official Charts)	21
Swedish Albums (Sverigetopplistan)	35
Swiss Albums (Schweizer Hitparade)	56
UK Albums (Official Charts)	25
UK Rock & Metal Albums (Official Charts)	1
US Billboard 200	2
US Digital Albums (Billboard)	2
US Top Hard Rock Albums (Billboard)	1
US Top Rock Albums (Billboard)	1
US Indie Store Album Sales (Billboard)	1
