= Chris Adler =

American drummer

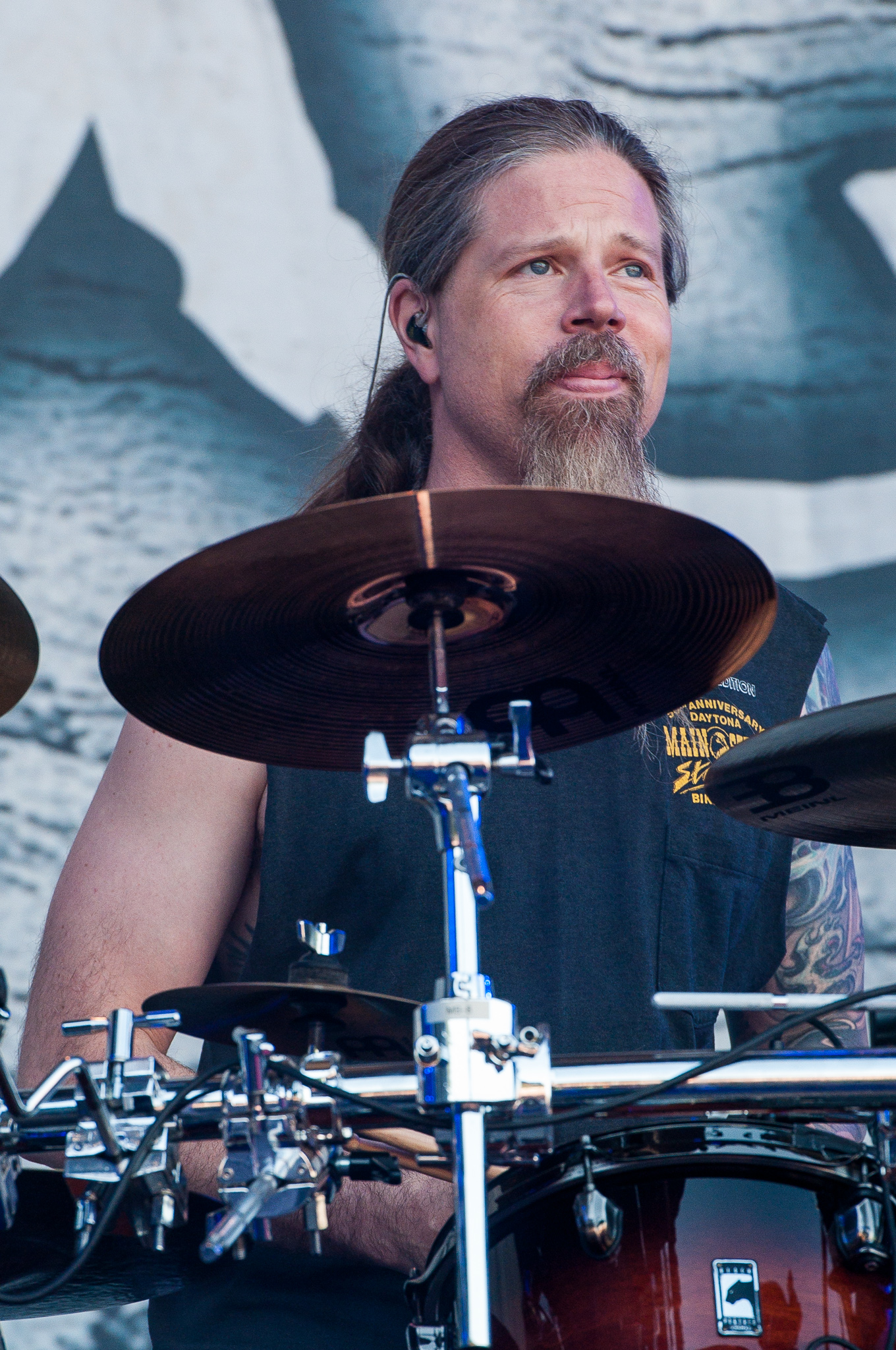
- Adler in 2015

Background information
- Born: Christopher James Adler; November 23, 1972 (age 53)
- Origin: Washington, D.C., U.S.
- Genres: Heavy metal; groove metal; thrash metal; metalcore; progressive metal
- Occupation: Musician
- Instrument: Drums
- Member of: Firstborne
- Formerly of: Lamb of God; Megadeth; Blotted Science; Protest the Hero; Nitro
- Website: chrisadler.com

Christopher James Adler (born November 23, 1972) is an American musician, best known as a founding member and the longtime drummer of heavy metal band Lamb of God from 1994 to 2019.

He was also a Grammy Award winning member of Megadeth from 2015 to 2016, appearing on their fifteenth album, Dystopia.

== Early life and influences ==
Christopher Adler was born on November 23, 1972. Growing up he played multiple instruments, first the piano with his mother who was a singer and pianist herself. During middle school he played alto saxophone, acoustic guitar and bass guitar. During his high school years he played in multiple local bands.

His influences include former Wrathchild America and former Godsmack drummer Shannon Larkin, and Stewart Copeland of The Police. Other influences are John Bonham, Dave Lombardo, Gar Samuelson, Lars Ulrich, Billy Cobham, and Gene Hoglan.

In an interview with DRUM! magazine, Adler describes his first drum kit as a disaster:

"The bass drum legs were different lengths so they wouldn't touch the ground at the same time. Every time I would hit it, it would wobble from left to right. The cymbal stands were duct taped together, and I think after two or three times playing the kit, the pedalboard actually broke in half because it was made of that crappy old fake metal."

== Career ==
=== Lamb of God ===
Adler attended Virginia Commonwealth University, in Richmond, Virginia where he met John Campbell, Mark Morton, and Matt Conner the four of them started a band named Burn the Priest in 1994. Following multiple lineup changes, they recruited vocalist Randy Blythe and released their eponymous 1999 debut under their original band moniker, Burn the Priest. When guitarist Abe Spear left and was replaced by Adler’s younger brother, Willie, the group renamed itself Lamb of God. They signed with Prosthetic Records in 2000 and released New American Gospel in September of that year. He went on to release 8 albums as a member of Lamb of God/Burn the Priest including two gold records for Ashes of the Wake (2004) and Sacrament (2006).

In 2019 he announced his departure from Lamb of God after 25 years with the group. In early May 2025, Adler revealed that his dismissal from Lamb of God was partly due to "developing Musician's Dystonia, a neurological condition that causes nerve deterioration in limbs most frequently used by musicians", in Adler's case his right foot. After years of growing tensions within the band, particularly after his time serving as Megadeth's drummer and in tandem with his condition, Lamb of God eventually told Adler "that his services were no longer required" despite being aware of his MD.

=== Other appearances and projects ===
In 2013 Adler played the drums on Protest The Hero Juno Award winning album Volition.

In 2012, he contributed several drum tracks to the Testament album Dark Roots of Earth. In 2014, he said that he could neither "confirm nor deny" whether he had performed on the Slipknot single "The Negative One". He dismissed this in a later interview. Upon Gene Hoglan’s departure from Testament In 2022 Alder was asked to become his replacement but turned down the offer, due to a recent divorce and health challenges he was facing at the time.

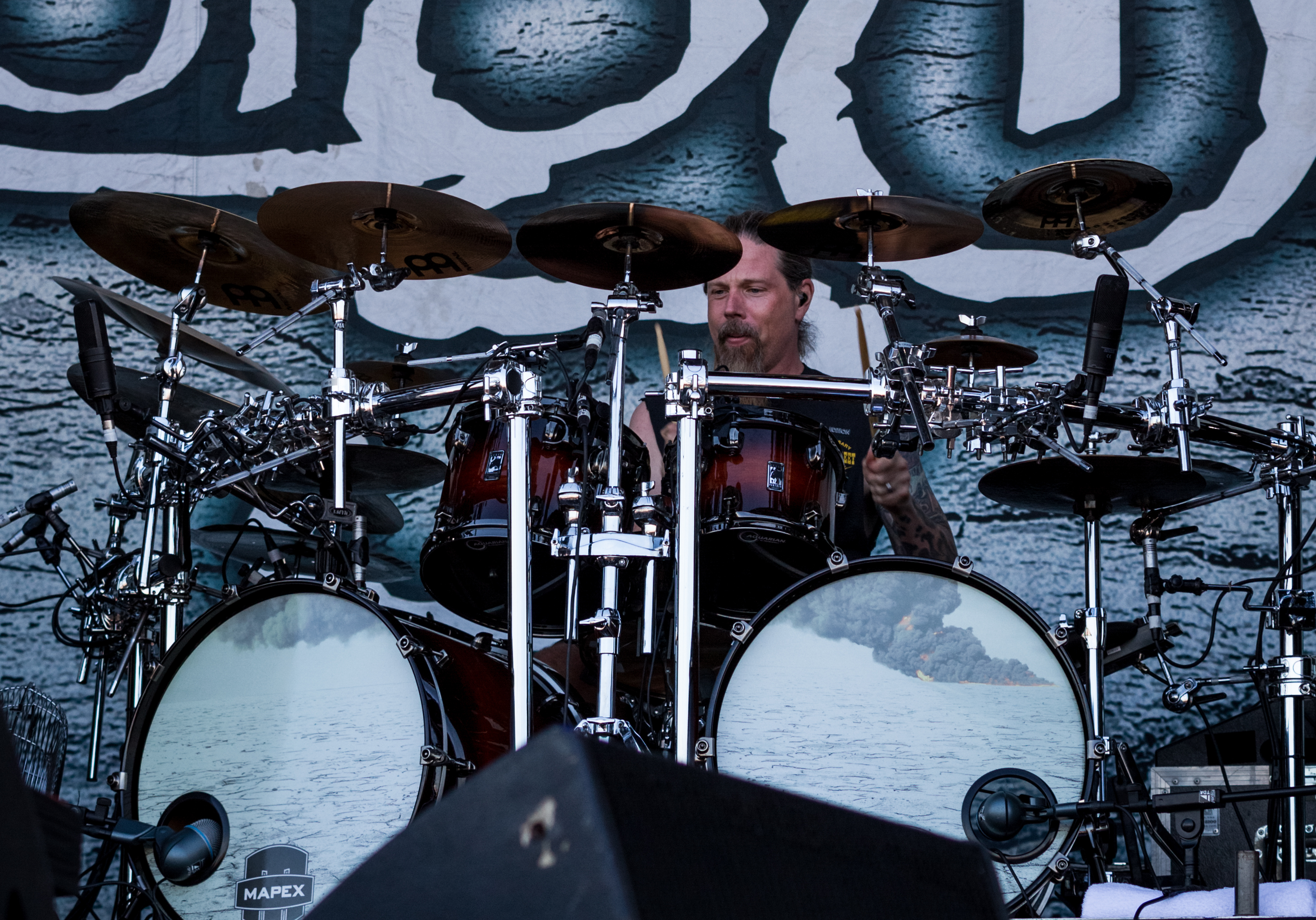
Adler performing with Lamb of God at Rock am Ring 2015

In 2016 he joined Megadeth to contribute to their 2016 album Dystopia. On February 12, 2017, Dystopia won the Best Metal Performance award at the 59th Grammy Awards.

In 2020 he joined the super group Firstborne in 2020 with vocalist Girish Pradhan, guitarist Myrone, and bassist James LoMenzo. They released an EP that same year and released their debut album Lucky in 2025.

In 2024 Adler formed a new band called Shallow Rising. Featuring vocalist Alex Villarreal, guitarist Tim Ossenfort, bassist Taylor Brandt, and keyboardist Tim King. On September 12, 2024 a music video was released for their debut song "Remorse Code".

== Personal life ==
In February 2019, Adler announced his engagement to his longtime girlfriend. Adler is interested in animal rights and is a vegetarian.

== Accolades ==
Adler won the following Modern Drummer magazine Reader's Poll awards:

- Best Metal Drummer 2007, 2011, 2012, 2014 and 2019.

In 2012 Adler was nominated for best drummer at that years Revolver Golden Gods Awards, then in 2016 he won drummer of the year at the 2016 Revolver Golden Gods Awards for his work on Dystopia.

He was nominated for 5 Grammys as a member of Lamb of God and finally won one as a member of Megadeth for Best Metal Performance at the 59th Annual Grammy Awards.

== Discography ==
With Calibra

- Demo Tape (1989, independently released)

With Cry Havoc

- Demo Tape (1993, independently released)

With Jettison Charlie

- Hitchhiking to Budapest (1994, Turn of the Century)
- Legions of the Unjazzed / I Love You, You Bastard EP (1996, Peas Kor Records)

With EvilDeathInc.

- Bedroom Compilation Cassette (1995, Funeral)
- "Full On" Now That's Metal Compilation CD (1996, mp3.com)
- Sevens and More (1998, mp3.com)

With Burn the Priest

- Demo Tape (1995, independently released)
- Split with ZED (1997, Goatboy Records)
- Split with Agents of Satan (1998, Deaf American Recordings)
- Sevens and More (1998, mp3.com)
- Burn the Priest (1998, Legion Records)
- Legion: XX (2018, Epic / Nuclear Blast)

With Grouser

- Demo tape (1996, independently released)

With Lamb of God

- New American Gospel (2000)
- As the Palaces Burn (2003)
- Ashes of the Wake (2004)
- Sacrament (2006)
- Wrath (2009)
- Resolution (2012)
- VII: Sturm und Drang (2015)

Solo

- Drum Nation Volume 3 (2006, Magna Carta) feat. Ron Jarzombek
- Chris Adler and Jason Bittner: Live at Modern Drummer Festival 2005 DVD (2006, Hudson Music)

With Testament

- Dark Roots of Earth song "A Day in the Death" (2012, Nuclear Blast)

With Protest the Hero

- Volition (2013)

With Megadeth

- Dystopia (2016)

With Thaikkudam Bridge

- Namah (2019)

With Firstborne

- Firstborne EP (2020, Firstborne Records)
- Lucky (2025, M-Theory Audio)
