= Mark Morton (guitarist) =

American musician (born 1972)

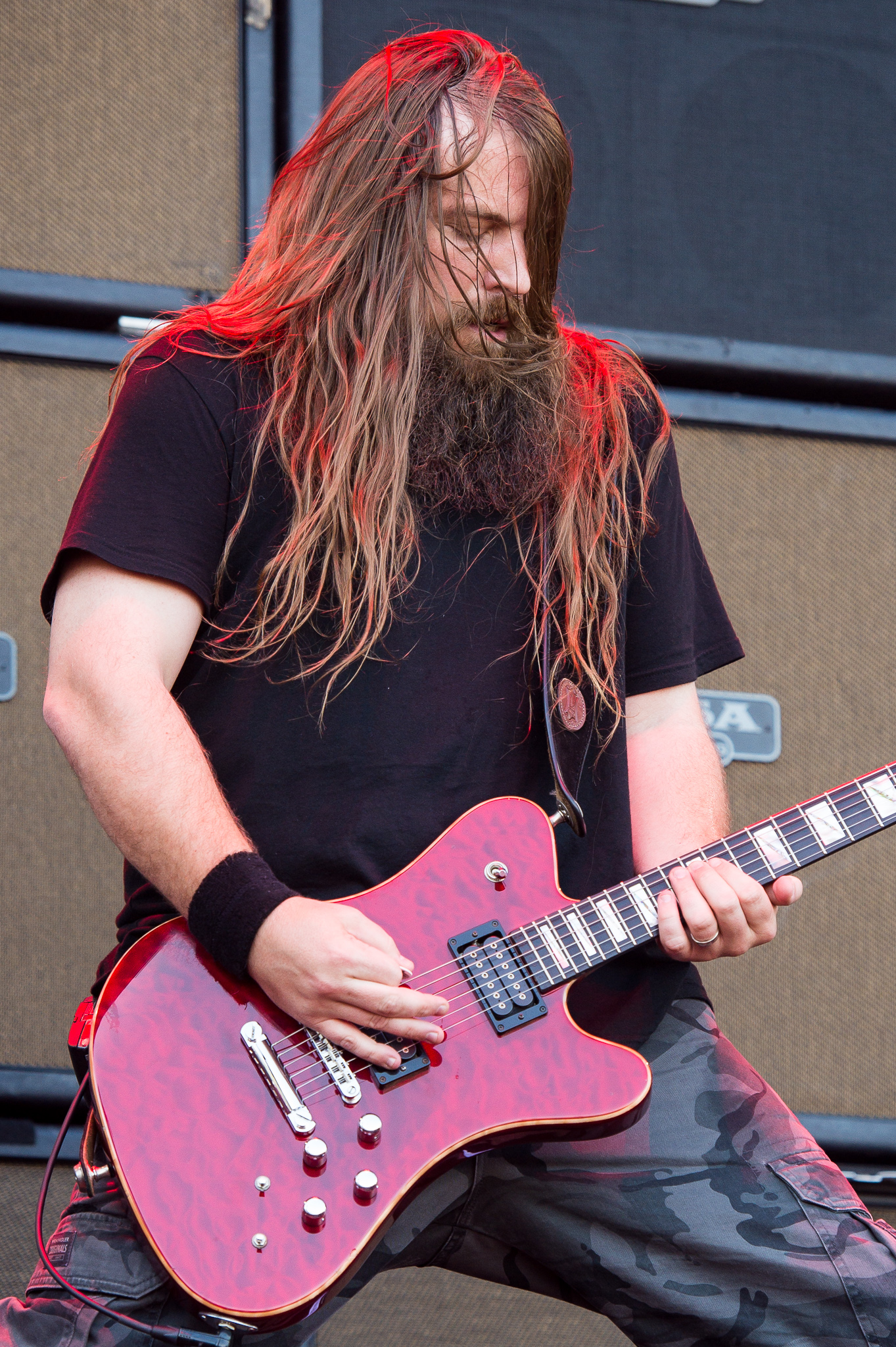
- Morton performing at Rock im Park 2015

Background information
- Born: Mark Duane Morton; November 25, 1972 (age 53); Williamsburg, Virginia, U.S.
- Genres: Heavy metal; groove metal; metalcore; thrash metal; hard rock
- Occupations: Musician; songwriter
- Instrument: Guitar
- Years active: 1989–present
- Labels: Spinefarm; Rise
- Member of: Lamb of God
- Website: lamb-of-god.com markmortonmusic.com

Mark Duane Morton (born November 25, 1972) is an American musician who is the lead guitarist and one of the founding members of the heavy metal band Lamb of God.

== Early life and influences ==
Morton grew up in Williamsburg, Virginia. He got his first acoustic guitar during his youth. Morton found the blues early on and was first inspired to play guitar after hearing Eddie Van Halen. Morton was also influenced by British blues guitarists such as Eric Clapton and Jimmy Page. Some of his other personal influences include Jimi Hendrix and Jeff Hanneman.

Before college, Morton played guitar in Killing Cycle, a high school thrash metal band with drummer Joey Huertas and singer Chris Marrow. The band performed at local venues and recorded four original songs at a studio Morton found. It dissolved when Marrow enlisted in the Marines, and Morton left for college.

== Career ==
=== Lamb of God ===
After graduating from Lafayette High School. Morton then attended Virginia Commonwealth University, in Richmond, Virginia where he met John Campbell, Chris Adler, and Matt Conner the four of them started a band named Burn the Priest in 1994. Soon after the band formed Morton left the group to pursue a masters degree in hopes of becoming a college professor. However he ultimately returned to the band in 1997, and following multiple lineup changes, they recruited vocalist Randy Blythe and released their eponymous 1999 debut under their original band moniker, Burn the Priest. When guitarist Abe Spear left and was replaced by Adler’s younger brother, Willie, the group renamed itself Lamb of God. They signed with Prosthetic Records in 2000 and released New American Gospel in September of that year.

Since then Morton and Lamb of God have gone on to become a significant band in the metal genre, releasing ten albums under the name Lamb of God and two under Burn the Priest. They have produced two gold records for Ashes of the Wake (2004) and Sacrament (2006). They have also received five Grammy nominations in the Best Metal Performance category.

Morton also composed the music for the bands 2013 documentary As the Palaces Burn.

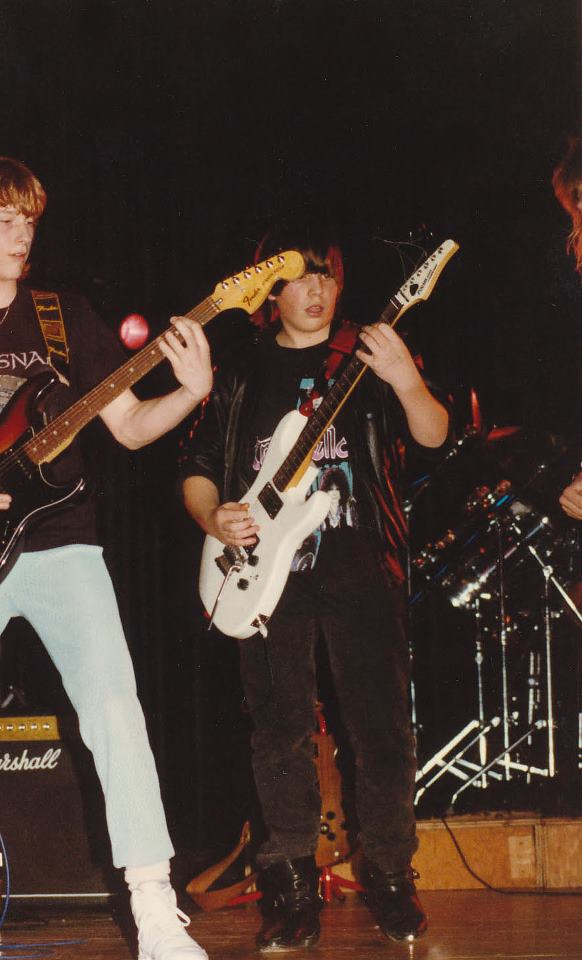
Morton (right) with Axis, circa 1988

=== Solo career ===
In December 2018, Morton announced his solo debut album, Anesthetic to be released on March 1, 2019, through Spinefarm Records. A single from the album titled "The Truth Is Dead" was released following the announcement and features Morton's Lamb of God bandmate Randy Blythe as well as Arch Enemy frontwoman Alissa White-Gluz on vocals. The album also features a posthumous collaboration with late Linkin Park frontman Chester Bennington, which was teased all the way back to April 2017. The song titled "Cross Off" was released as the album's second single on January 8, 2019. "Cross Off" quickly became one of his most popular songs and reached the top 10 on the U.S. Mainstream Rock Chart peaking at number 7.

In December of 2019 Morton announced he would release a five song EP featuring collaborations with Lzzy Hale , Howard Jones, John Carbone and Mark Morales. It was later released in January 2020.

On January 16, 2025 Morton released a new single "Hell & Back" featuring Jaren Johnston. The album Without the Pain was later released in April of that year and featured a country rock style. The album featured multiple collaborations with the likes of Isbell, Grace Bowers, Charlie Starr and Cody Jinks. Guitar World wrote on the album stating "beyond the guest stars, Morton’s bluesy chops and soulful solos make it stick."

== Gear ==
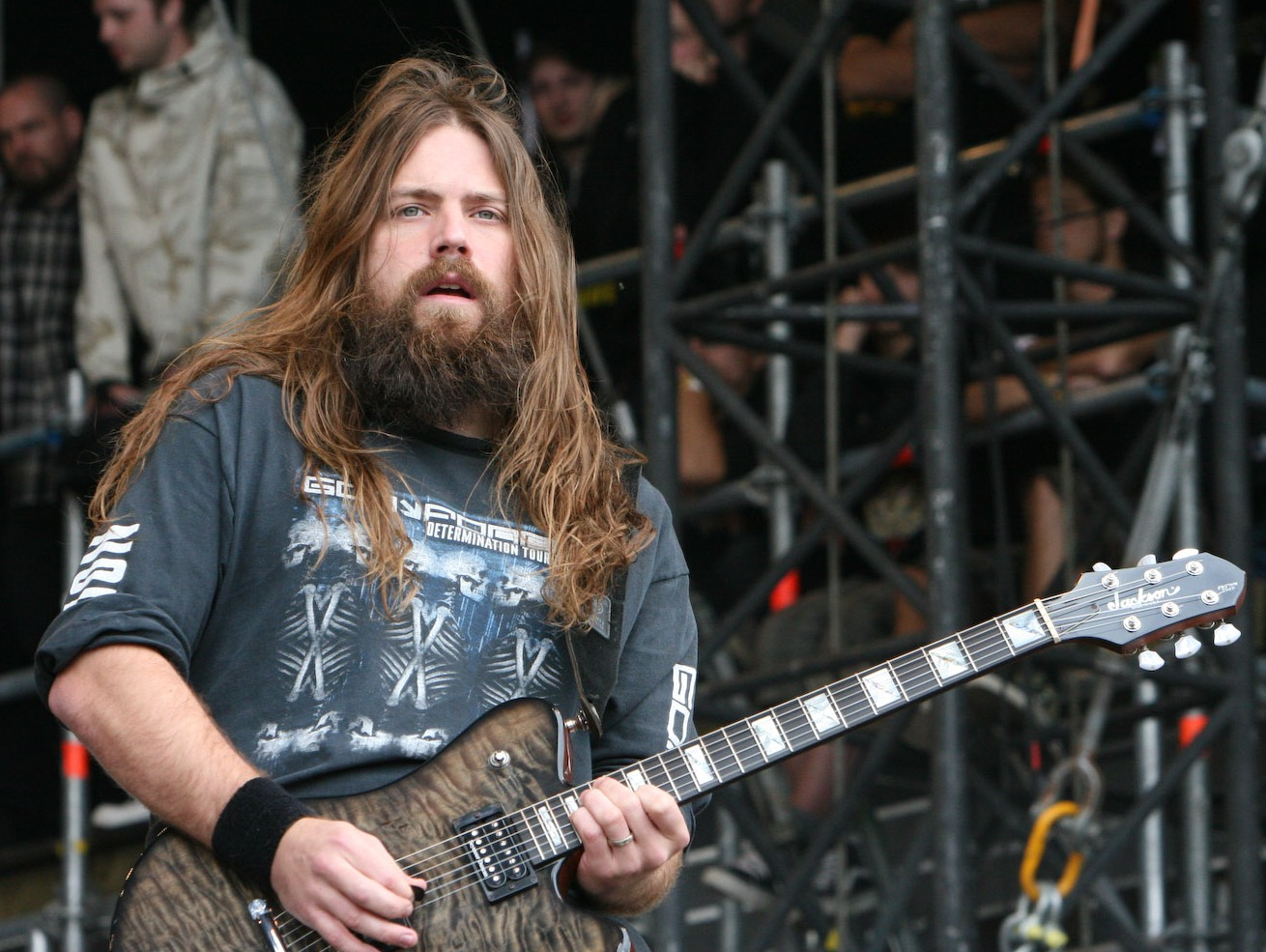
Morton with Full Force 2007

Morton has a large guitar collection with his first guitar being a 1975 Deluxe Les Paul that was hacked up for humbuckers. Morton had a longstanding relationship with Jackson guitars that spawned a line of Dominion signature models. However in September of 2022 it was announced that Morton had signed with Gibson.

In February of 2026 his first signature Gibson guitar called the Mark Morton Les Paul Modern Quilt was released.

== Personal life ==
Morton and his first wife had their first child, in 2009 a daughter named Madalyn. However she died the day after her birth due to a bacterial infection contracted during delivery. Morton has another child with his first wife, born in 2010, and one with his second wife, born in 2021.

Morton's memoir, "Desolation: A Heavy Metal Memoir" was released on June 25, 2024, which delves into his personal and professional life, including struggles with addiction, grief, and the music industry. Morton reveals that writing the memoir was a therapeutic process, allowing him to reflect on and make sense of his experiences.

Morton lives near Richmond, Virginia, with his wife and children.

Although Morton previously struggled with alcoholism and an opiate addiction he has since recovered and now lives a sober lifestyle.

== Discography ==
=== Solo ===
==== Studio albums ====
- Anesthetic (2019, Spinefarm Records)
- Without the Pain (2025)

==== EPs ====
- Ether (2020, Rise Records)

==== Singles ====
Title	Year	Peak chart positions				Album
Title	Year	US Airplay	US Main.	US Rock	US Hard Rock Digital	Album
"The Truth Is Dead" (featuring Randy Blythe and Alissa White-Gluz)	2018	—	—	—	—	Anesthetic
"Cross Off" (featuring Chester Bennington)	2019	25	7	37	11	Anesthetic
"Save Defiance" (featuring Myles Kennedy)	2019	—	—	—	—	Anesthetic
"All I Had to Lose" (featuring Mark Morales)	2020	—	—	—	—	Ether
"—" denotes a release that did not chart.

=== With Burn the Priest ===
- Demo Tape (1995, independently released)
- Split with ZED (1997, Goatboy Records)
- Split with Agents of Satan (1998, Deaf American Recordings)
- Sevens and More (1998, mp3.com)
- Burn the Priest (1999, Legion Records)
- Legion: XX (2018, Epic / Nuclear Blast)

=== With Lamb of God ===
- New American Gospel (2000, Prosthetic Records) (credited under his middle name, Duane)
- As the Palaces Burn (2003, Prosthetic Records)
- Ashes of the Wake (2004, Epic Records)
- Killadelphia (2005, Epic Records)
- Sacrament (2006, Epic Records)
- Wrath (2009, Roadrunner Records/Epic Records)
- Resolution (2012, Roadrunner Records/Epic Records)
- VII: Sturm und Drang (2015, Epic Records/Nuclear Blast Records)
- Lamb of God (2020, Epic Records/Nuclear Blast Records)
- Omens (2022, Nuclear Blast Records)
- Into Oblivion (2026, Century Media Records/Epic Records)
