= New American Gospel =

Studio album by Lamb of God
- Released: September 26, 2000
- Recorded: April 15–22, 2000
- Studios: Austin Enterprises, Clinton, Massachusetts
- Genres: Groove metal; death metal; metalcore; thrash metal
- Length: 41:34
- Label: Prosthetic
- Producers: Steve Austin; Chris Adler; Lamb of God

Lamb of God chronology
New American Gospel (2000)	As the Palaces Burn (2003)

Lamb of God overall chronology
Burn the Priest (1999)	New American Gospel (2000)	As the Palaces Burn (2003)

Singles from New American Gospel
- 1. "Black Label" Released: July 2001

New American Gospel is the debut studio album by American heavy metal band Lamb of God, their first album under that name (they were originally known as Burn the Priest). It was released in 2000 through Prosthetic Records. New American Gospel is also the first release with Willie Adler on guitar, who replaced Abe Spear.

Metal Blade Records reissued a remastered version of New American Gospel in 2006 with four bonus tracks. The remastered version contains a note on the inlay that explains that the sound of the album is less polished than their newer work, in part due to time constraints as well as heavy drinking. It has sold over 100,000 copies in the United States.

== Reception ==
Professional ratings
Review scores
Source	Rating
Allmusic	4/5 stars
Collector's Guide to Heavy Metal	8/10
Exclaim!	favorable
NME	8/10

Revolver magazine called New American Gospel one of the "69 Greatest Heavy Metal Albums of All Time". NME said the album "harks back to the days when Slayer ruled the kingdom of metal with speedy riffs and nihilism", and described the sound as "ferocious". CMJ described New American Gospel as "grindcore and death metal for the hardcore kids". Exclaim! compared New American Gospel to bands such as Pantera and Meshuggah, noted its "truly killer snare drum sound", and described the album in general as "a thoroughly satisfying listen and an innovative, real, heavy and scary metal album".

In 2020, it was named one of the 20 best metal albums of 2000 by Metal Hammer magazine.

== Track listing ==
All lyrics are written by Randy Blythe, except where noted; all music is composed by Lamb of God.

No.	Title	Length
1.	"Black Label"	4:52
2.	"A Warning"	2:23
3.	"In the Absence of the Sacred"	4:37
4.	"Letter to the Unborn"	2:56
5.	"The Black Dahlia"	3:20
6.	"Terror and Hubris in the House of Frank Pollard" (featuring Steve Austin; lyrics: Austin, Blythe)	5:37
7.	"The Subtle Arts of Murder and Persuasion"	4:10
8.	"Pariah"	4:24
9.	"Confessional" (lyrics: Mark Morton, Blythe)	4:01
10.	"O.D.H.G.A.B.F.E."	5:14
Total length:		41:34

Japanese release bonus track
No.	Title	Length
11.	"Nippon"	3:55
Total length:		45:29

2006 remastered re-release bonus tracks
No.	Title	Length
12.	"New Willenium" ("The Black Dahlia" demo version)	3:06
13.	"Half-Lid" ("A Warning" demo version)	2:28
14.	"Flux" ("Pariah" demo version)	4:24
Total length:		55:27

== Personnel ==
Credits taken from New American Gospel CD booklet.

=== Lamb of God ===
- Randy Blythe – vocals
- Mark Morton – guitar
- Willie Adler – guitar
- John Campbell – bass
- Chris Adler – drums

=== Additional personnel ===
- Lamb of God – production, mixing
- Chris Adler – analog editing
- Steve Austin – additional vocals on "Terror and Hubris in the House of Frank Pollard", production, mixing, engineering, analog editing, digital editing, mastering
- Dave Murello – digital editing
- Ryan Smith – remastering at Sterling Sound
