= Legion Records =

American record label

- Founded: 1997
- Founder: Michael Brosnan
- Status: Defunct
- Genre: Various
- Country of origin: United States
- Location: Philadelphia, Pennsylvania

Web logo when known as Goatboy

Legion Records was an American independent record label. It was started by Michael Brosnan in 1997 as Goatboy Records and later changed to Goatboy Farms Recordings. The final name change (to Legion) occurred in 1999. Based in Philadelphia, Pennsylvania, the label specialized in the heavy metal, grindcore and sludge genres of music.

== Releases ==
- GB001 Burn the Priest / ZED (split, 7" vinyl record)
- GB002 Machine That Flashes – Resensitized (EP, 7" vinyl record)
- GB003 ZED / 309 Chorus (split, CD)
- Terror13-04 Burn the Priest – Burn the Priest (full-length, CD)
- Terror13-05 Noisegate – The Towers Are Burning (full-length, CD)
- Terror13-06 Wormwood – Behemoth (EP, 7" vinyl record)

The following release by Legion Records has an unknown catalog number:

- Wormwood – Requiescat (full-length, CD, co-release with Arm Records)
