= As the Palaces Burn =

Studio album by Lamb of God
- Released: May 6, 2003
- Recorded: 2002
- Studios: Montana, Inc., Richmond, Virginia
- Genres: Groove metal; thrash metal; metalcore
- Length: 38:06
- Label: Prosthetic
- Producers: Devin Townsend; Lamb of God

Lamb of God chronology
| New American Gospel (2000) | As the Palaces Burn (2003) | Ashes of the Wake (2004) |

Singles from As the Palaces Burn
- 1. "11th Hour" Released: July 19, 2003; 2. "Ruin" Released: October 18, 2003; 3. "As the Palaces Burn" Released: March 1, 2004

Professional ratings
Review scores
| Source | Rating |
|---|---|
| AllMusic | 3/5 stars |
| Blabbermouth.net | 8/10 |
| Collector's Guide to Heavy Metal | 9/10 |
| Entertainment Weekly | B |
| MetalReviews.com | 8.6/10 |
| Rolling Stone | 3/5 stars |
| Ultimate Guitar | 8/10 |

As the Palaces Burn is the second studio album by American heavy metal band Lamb of God (third overall counting Burn the Priest), released under Prosthetic Records on May 6, 2003. The album was produced by Devin Townsend and the band itself, and received considerably more airplay than their previous effort, with three singles. As of 2013, As The Palaces Burn has sold 270,000 copies since its original release, according to Nielsen SoundScan.

The band released a 10th anniversary edition of the album on November 11, 2013, with all songs in the album being remixed and remastered, alongside three bonus demo tracks. The 10th-anniversary edition of the album sold around 6,400 copies in the United States in its first week of release to land at position No. 64 on Billboard 200 chart.

Lamb of God has released two documentaries under the same name: one alongside the release of the album in 2003, and another in 2014, which focused on the band's 2012 world tour and the death of a fan, leading to the arrest and acquittal of Randy Blythe in Prague.

In celebration of the albums 20th anniversary the band played it in its entirety at the 2023 Milwaukee Metal Fest.

In 2013, the staff of Loudwire included the main riff of the song "11th Hour" in their list of "the 10 Best Metal Riffs of the 2000s".

== Critical reception ==
Blabbermouth.net gave the album a 8/10 stating "it's refreshing to find LAMB OF GOD refusing to court mainstream acceptance and instead wholeheartedly embracing its brutality. With confrontational lyrics, relentlessly harsh vocals (Blythe must gargle with broken glass), a virgin-tight rhythm section and riffs heavy enough to test the endurance of even the toughest moshpits, "As The Palaces Burn" is uncompromising in its aural assault." Entertainment Weekly also gave the record a positive review stating "AS THE PALACES BURN" is lean and mean. Surrendering to the aggro pummeling is extremely satisfying."

AllMusic gave the record a 3/5 stating "The band's second effort as Lamb of God, 2003's equally impressive As the Palaces Burn. First off, gone is that out-of-whack percussive curiosity (thanks, boys!), but the band's knack for conjuring tasty riffs out of death metal's tired and weathered carcass remains intact, and it's pleasantly refreshing to discover something memorable and compelling about virtually every song."

== Accolades ==
Revolver Magazine named As the Palaces Burn their album of the year in 2003.

In 2017, Rolling Stone put As the Palaces Burn at #86 on their Top 100 Greatest Metal Albums of All Time list with Dan Epstein praising Devin Townsend's production which helped sharpen the guitar riffs on songs like "Vigil", "Ruin" and "11th Hour".

== Track listing ==
All tracks are written by Lamb of God.

| No. | Title | Length |
|---|---|---|
| 1. | "Ruin" | 3:55 |
| 2. | "As the Palaces Burn" | 2:24 |
| 3. | "Purified" | 3:11 |
| 4. | "11th Hour" | 3:44 |
| 5. | "For Your Malice" | 3:43 |
| 6. | "Boot Scraper" | 4:40 |
| 7. | "A Devil in God's Country" | 3:10 |
| 8. | "In Defense of Our Good Name" | 4:13 |
| 9. | "Blood Junkie" | 4:23 |
| 10. | "Vigil" | 4:42 |
| Total length: | | 38:06 |

10th anniversary edition bonus tracks
| No. | Title | Length |
|---|---|---|
| 11. | "Ruin" (demo) | 3:44 |
| 12. | "As the Palaces Burn" (demo) | 2:26 |
| 13. | "Blood Junkie" (demo) | 4:16 |
| Total length: | | 48:32 |

== Personnel ==
Lamb of God

- Randy Blythe – vocals
- Mark Morton – guitar
- Willie Adler – guitar
- John Campbell – bass
- Chris Adler – drums

Additional musicians

- Chris Poland – guitar on "Purified"
- Devin Townsend – backing vocals and guitar on "A Devil in God's Country"
- Steve Austin – backing vocals on "11th Hour"

Additional personnel

- Devin Townsend – production, engineering
- Shaun Thingvold – mixing
- Josh Wilbur – mixing (10th Anniversary Edition)
- Louie Teran – mastering
- Brad Blackwood – mastering (10th Anniversary Edition)
- Carla Lewis, Dan Kearley, Dennis Solomon, Grant Rutledge, Scott Cooke – assistant engineers
- Petar Sardelich – engineer for Chris Poland
- K3N – artwork
- Adam Wentworth – picture disc artwork redesign

== Release history ==
| Region | Date | Label | Format | Catalog |
|---|---|---|---|---|
| US | 2003 | Prosthetic | CD | 10008-2 |
| US | 2003 | Prosthetic | CD/DVD | 793018 291902 |
| European Union | 2004 | Epic | CD | EPC 513880 2 |
| Australia & New Zealand | 2004 | Epic | CD | 5138 8 02000 |
| US | 2004 | Black Market Activities | LP | BMA 006 |
| US | 2009 | Prosthetic | LP | 6561910008-1 |
| Worldwide | November 11, 2013 | Prosthetic/Razor & Tie | CD | LOG000CD00-DL |
| Worldwide | November 11, 2013 | Prosthetic/Razor & Tie | LP | LOG000LP00-DL |

== Charts ==
| Chart (2013) | Peak position |
|---|---|
| US Billboard 200 | 64 |
| US Indie Store Album Sales (Billboard) | 25 |
