= Randy Blythe =

American vocalist

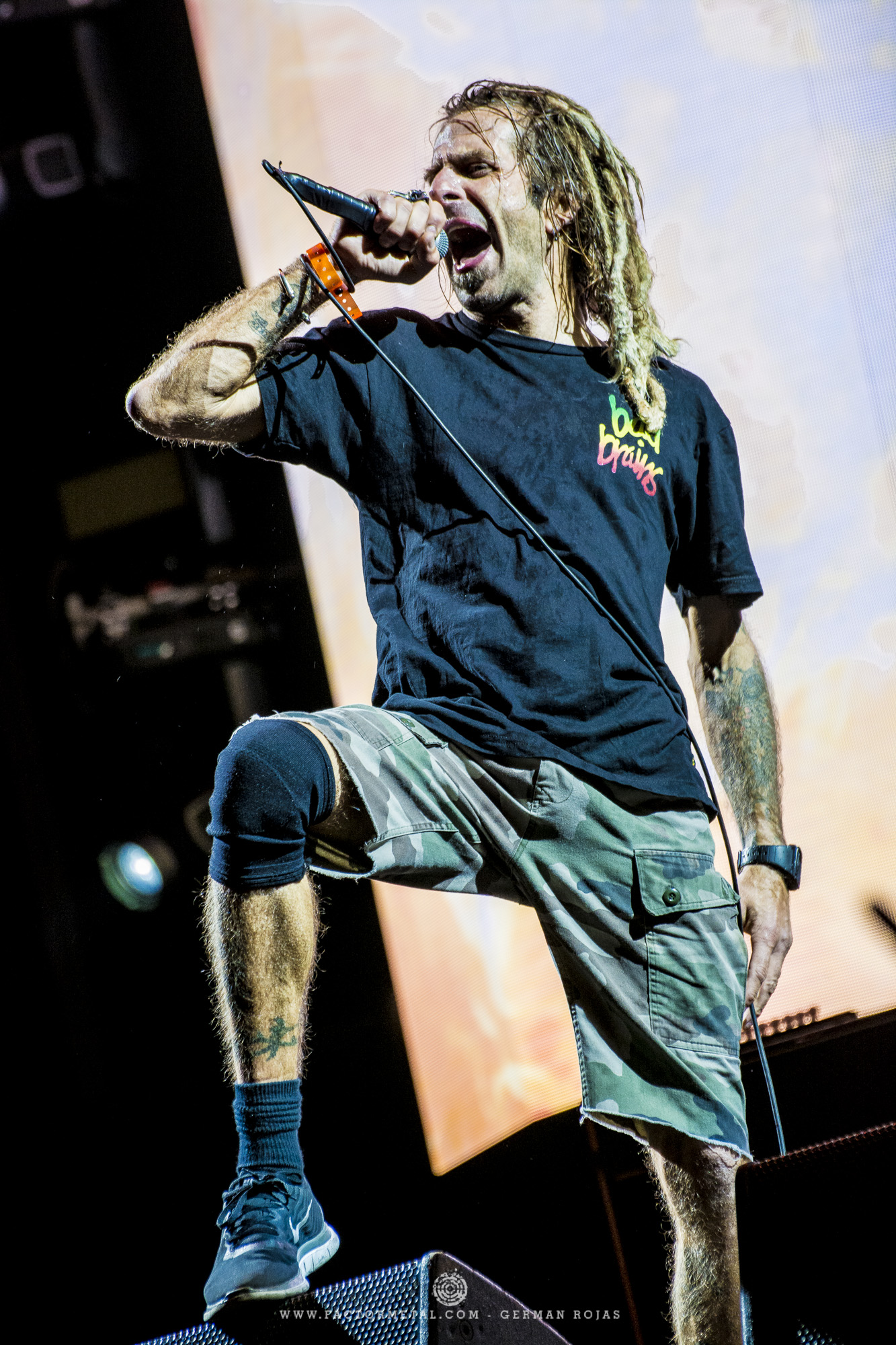
- Blythe at Rock al Parque 2017

Background information
- Born: David Randall Blythe; February 21, 1971 (age 55); Fort Meade, Maryland, U.S.
- Origin: Franklin, Virginia, U.S.
- Genres: Groove metal; metalcore; thrash metal
- Occupations: Singer; songwriter
- Years active: 1994–present
- Member of: Lamb of God; Halo of Locusts; Over it All
- Formerly of: Pigface; Burn the Priest

David Randall Blythe (/blaɪ/, born February 21, 1971) is an American vocalist, best known as the lead singer and lyricist of heavy metal band Lamb of God and Burn the Priest. He has also performed guest vocals for Cannabis Corpse, A Life Once Lost, Overkill, Gojira, Pitch Black Forecast, Eyehategod, Eluveitie, Bad Brains, Soulfly, Clutch, Body Count, DevilDriver, Suicide Silence, Doyle, Metal Allegiance, Voodoo Glow Skulls, Lacuna Coil, Walls of Jericho, and Mastodon; and is the lead singer of side-project band Halo of Locusts.

Outside of music Blythe has released two books which both became Publishers Weekly non-fiction best sellers. He has also made multiple appearances in television and film. In 2016 Loudwire named him the #61 best Hard Rock / Metal Frontman of all time.

== Early life ==
David Randall Blythe was born on February 21, 1971, at Fort Meade, Maryland, where his father was serving in the Air Force. His parents divorced when he was young, and while he was in the fourth grade, he moved to Virginia, where he lived on his grandmother’s farm with his father and brothers. Blythe has described himself as a "nerd" during his youth, being an avid reader and playing games such as Dungeons & Dragons. He was first introduced to punk rock in the sixth grade while attending a summer camp, where a friend gave him a copy of Never Mind the Bollocks, Here's the Sex Pistols by the Sex Pistols. Blythe graduated from Western Branch High School in Chesapeake, in 1989 and was also enrolled at the Governor’s School for the Arts for a period of time.

After dropping of out college Blythe spent that Summer hopping freight trains to travel across country, after two months he returned to Virginia where he tried out for Burn the Priest and became their lead singer.

== Professional career ==
Blythe joined Lamb of God in 1995, when they were still known as Burn the Priest. Before the band was successful, Blythe had previously worked as a cook and a roofer. The group released their self-titled album in 1999. Their first album under the name Lamb of God was released the following year, titled New American Gospel; this was followed by 2003's As the Palaces Burn. During this time, Blythe also started a side project band known as Halo of Locusts, who were founded around 2004. A full-length release was planned, but has yet to be released. They contributed to For the Sick, the tribute album for Eyehategod, covering "Dixie Whiskey". That same year, Blythe and Lamb of God made their major label debut with their gold certified record Ashes of the Wake. In a review by Ultimate Guitar, they wrote: "Blythe is what really sets this band apart from other metalcore bands out there, his scream and his growls have his distinctive sound. Only a few bands have their own original sound to the screams."

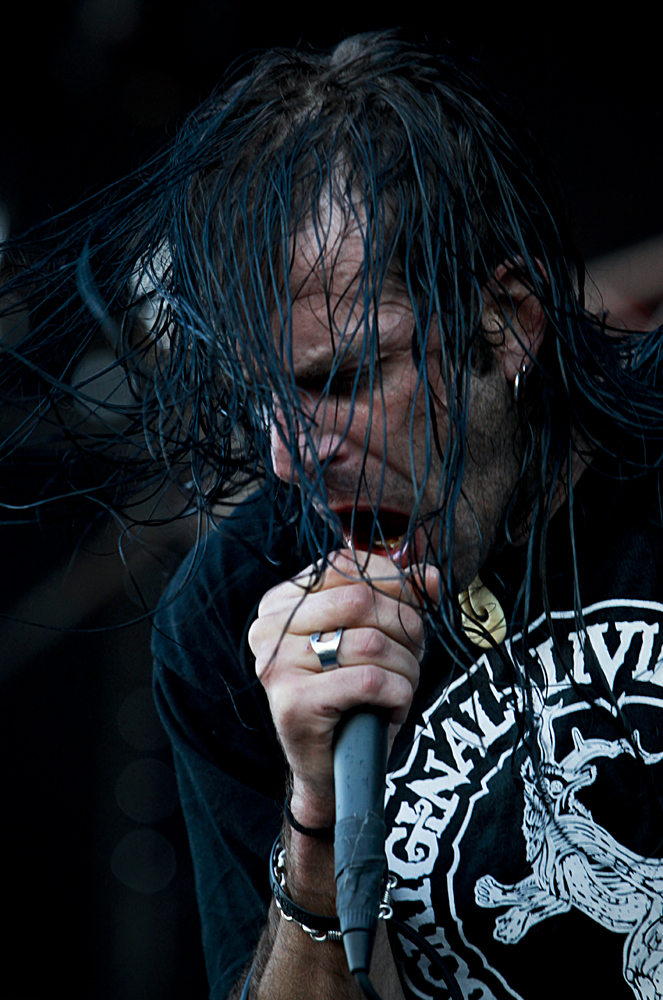
Blythe at Optimus Alive in Lisbon Portugal in 2009

In 2005, Blythe worked with the metalcore outfit A Life Once Lost on their album Hunter. In 2006 Blythe and Lamb of God released their 5th studio album Sacrament, this album has also been certified gold. The song "Redneck" earned Blythe and the band their first Grammy nomination for Best Metal Performance at the 2007 Grammy Awards for Best Metal Performance, but lost out to Slayer's "Eyes of the Insane".

He provided additional vocals on the A Life Once Lost track "Vulture" as well as helped in the vocal processing of the track. He later worked with the band again in 2007 on "Iron Gag." He also appeared on the song "Skull and Bones" by the band Overkill and "Adoration for None" on Gojira's album The Way of All Flesh. He was also featured on Shadows Fall song, King of Nothing, on their 2009 release, Retribution. Blythe was featured in many of his peers' DVDs, such as Killswitch Engage's (Set This) World Ablaze and Machine Head's Elegies. Blythe was also featured in Metal: A Headbanger's Journey, Working Class Rock Star, Melissa Cross's The Zen of Screaming, and Suicide Silence's Ending Is the Beginning: The Mitch Lucker Memorial Show (2014).

He appears as Luke in the movie The Graves (2009), written and directed by Brian Pulido. Also in 2009 he and Lamb of God released their 6th studio album, Wrath, which is their highest performing album as it topped the charts in Canada and debuted at number 2 on the Billboard 200. The record also took home album of the year at the 2009 Metal Hammer Golden Gods Awards. In 2011 Blythe was named to Revolver Magazines list of the 100 Greatest Living Rock Stars, as the magazine celebrated its 100th issue.

On January 5, 2012, Blythe announced that he would be running for President of the United States via a blog entry entitled "I want to be The Big Cheese". His official campaign slogan was "Fuck the dumb shit. Let's get real here." Blythe did not appear on the ballot in any of the fifty states or the District of Columbia. Shortly after Lamb of God's 7th studio album, Resolution, was released. Blythe stated he recorded the album completely sober, as he had struggled with alcoholism in the past. He stated that his sobriety contributed to his "ferocious" and more controlled vocal performance on the album. The record won Metal Album of the year at the 2nd annual Loudwire Music Awards, individually Blythe was nominated for male vocalist of the year.

On November 20, 2014, was announced that Blythe is to star in an action movie being made by Taiwanese metal band Chthonic. The film was later released in 2017 titled Tshiong, with Blythe only making a cameo appearance. On July 14, 2015, Blythe's first book, Dark Days: A Memoir was released by Da Capo Press. During its first week of sales, it made the Publishers Weekly non-fiction National Best Sellers list. The book went over Blythe's trail and life after awards. He stated in an interview “My Tribulations and Trials, is being written and will start with the arrest day and end “on a porch, by the beach.” 10 days later on July 24 Lamb of Gods album VII: Sturm und Drang was released. It was their first to be released following Blythe’s manslaughter case, despite this Blythe stated it would not be a prison record instead he would "write about things that affect me very deeply", such as going to prison in a foreign country and being charged with manslaughter. Blythe was once again nominated for male vocalist of the year at the 6th annual Loudwire Music Awards.

In February 2016, he joined Deafheaven on stage at the Hollywood Palladium in Los Angeles with their song "Dream House". Seven months later, in September 2016, he was recruited by Eyehategod as a replacement for lead singer Mike Williams during their US tour.

In July 2018 he collaborated with DevilDriver on the covers of "Ghost Riders in the Sky" by Johnny Cash and "Whiskey River" by Willie Nelson from Devil Driver's country covers album. In October, his voice appeared in the Soulfly song "Dead Behind the Eyes" from Ritual. Also in 2018 he and the other members of Lamb of God decided to release a record under their old name Burn the Priest titled Legion: XX. On April 4, 2019, Blythe made a music video for the Black Queen song "The End Where We Start".

In November 2019, Blythe was a member of the supergroup, Pigface, during the group's first tour in fourteen years. Initially, Blythe had agreed to perform with the group for the first five dates of the twelve-date tour but due to his enjoyment of it, he agreed to stay on for the remaining seven dates.

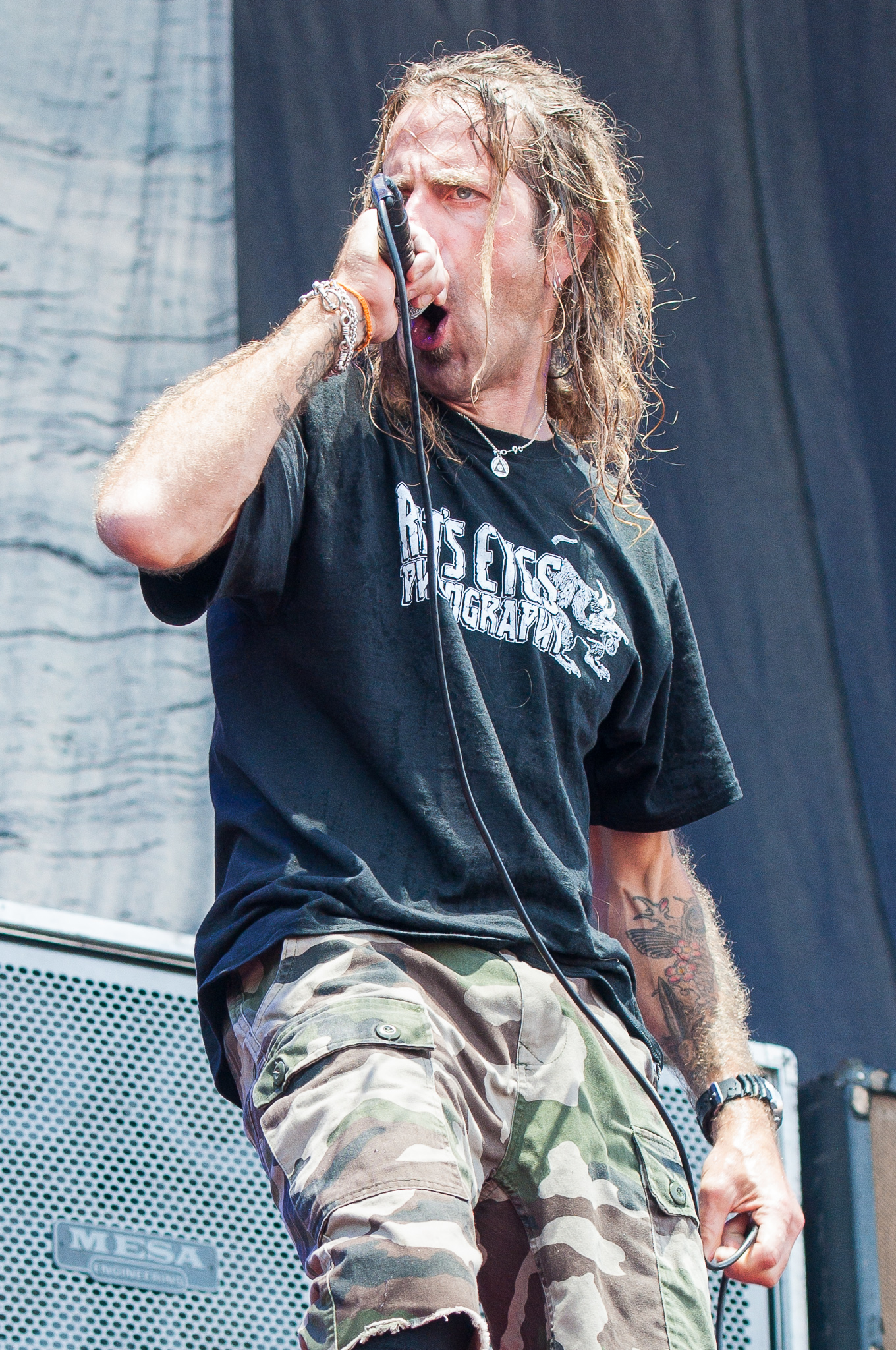
Blythe in 2015

In April 2020, Blythe and Scottish brewery BrewDog announced a collaboration that yielded a non-alcoholic beer named "Ghost Walker". The name is taken from the Lamb of God song "Ghost Walking" which is on their 2012 album Resolution. Blythe wrote the lyrics to the song whilst beginning his journey to live an alcohol-free lifestyle. Blythe also made a cameo appearance in the 2020 film Hairmetal Shotgun Zombie Massacre: The Movie. In June of that year Lamb of God released their 10th studio album a self titled record, their most recent record Omens was released in 2022.

Blythe played the recurring character Dom, leader of a veteran band called Over It All, in the 2021 an American musical drama television Paradise City.

On February 18, 2025, Blythe released his second book Just Beyond the Light. Just like his first book, with its first week sales, it made the Publishers Weekly non-fiction National Best Sellers list. Blythe also narrated the audio book version of Just Beyond the Light. The book touches upon struggles in Blythe’s personal life while also touching upon his love of surfing, he has claimed “it's a collection of thoughtful and inspiring essays that explore the human condition.”

== Artistry ==
Blythe's lyrics touch upon politics, war, existentialism, and his own personal challenges such as touring exhaustion, substance abuse, and depression. He also leaves the lyrics up to interpretation, once stating on their 2022 album Omens: "I don’t really want to give the play-by-play on what each song is about because I think it robs each person of the experience of making that music their own."

Blythe stated that when he first started learning how to scream, it was initially a joke. He recalled: "I thought it was stupid and funny, and so here I am. Never ever ever ever did I take it seriously... I never ever thought I would be in a heavy metal band either. I thought I was gonna be the south’s version of Johnny Rotten or Iggy Pop." Blythe cites early influence from hardcore and grind-style metal; he named Lee Dorrian (of Napalm Death) and Kevin Sharp (of Brutal Truth) as his 2 major vocal influences. He also acknowledged that while he's in a metal band, much of his musical foundation came from punk and hardcore, not just traditional metal. He eventually began incorporating clean singing into Lamb of God's music as well.

== Manslaughter charges and acquittal ==
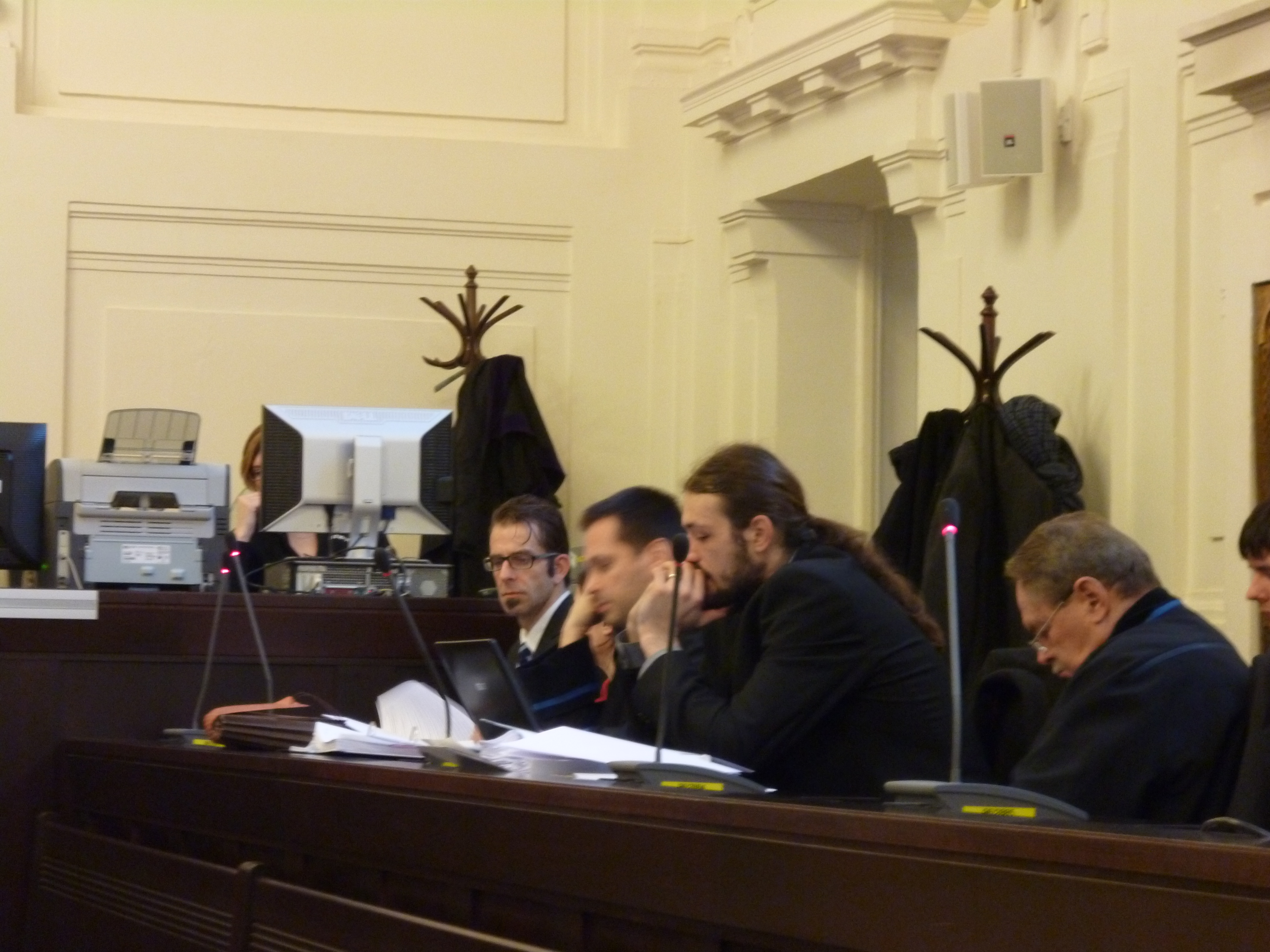
Randy Blythe (left) with his defence team during his manslaughter trial

At the end of June 2012, Blythe was arrested, charged and remanded in custody by the Czech authorities in connection with an incident that had happened during Lamb of God's previous concert in Prague two years earlier. According to the prosecution, Blythe shoved Daniel Nosek, a 19-year-old fan, off stage, thus inflicting fatal wounds on him. After being released on bail, which was contested by the State Attorney, Blythe denied responsibility for Nosek's death and pledged to return to attend the trial, which began on February 4, 2013.

According to a verdict delivered by the Municipal Court in Prague on March 5, 2013, it was proven that Blythe had shoved Nosek off the stage and Blythe thus has the moral responsibility for his death. Due to the circumstances, however, Blythe was held not criminally liable with most of the blame lying with the promoters and the security members. The State Attorney appealed the verdict, but the acquittal was upheld by the Prague High Court on June 5, 2013.

== Personal life ==
Blythe has struggled with alcoholism in the past, but has been sober since 2010. He claimed that he stopped drinking after a realization in Australia that alcohol was no longer working for him and that he was on a path to death if he didn't quit. In a 2015 interview with Metal Hammer he stated “I’m just this dude from a little town, I don’t feel like a rock star... I was a rampaging alcoholic that did his best to destroy his life, and now I'm living like a normal human being.”

In his free time Blythe is an avid photographer and surfer. In 2019 he teamed up with Dez Fafara to relaunch the SunCult Surfwear Brand.

=== Charity work ===
In 2007 Blythe auctioned off his Grammy Medallion that he had received from Lamb of God's 2006 song “Redneck”. He did this to raise funds for Myotonic Muscular Dystrophy research, in honor of his friend Todd, whose two sons suffered from the disease. The man who had won the auction then gifted it to Todd, and in 2018 when Blythe’s sister-in-law Bianca was raising funds for her breast cancer treatment Todd auctioned the Medallion off once again raising over $3,000 dollars for Bianca’s treatment. While on Jamey Jasta's podcast in 2025 Blythe revealed that he had auctioned off some of his other Medallions to charity stating “the Grammys mean fucking nothing to me.”

In 2016 Blythe wrote a song titled “The Duke” (released in 2016) which was written about a fan he met that was named Wayne Ford, who died of leukemia in 2015. After the song's release and its association with the bone-marrow / stem-cell donor registration organisation Be the Match (run by the National Marrow Donor Program), a man named Todd Seaman from Arkansas, who had registered thanks in part to hearing “The Duke”, was matched with a 65-year-old leukemia patient and donated stem cells/plasma. Blythe later posted on his Instagram “To say that I am honored to have been a small part of this is a massive understatement. Yesterday Todd said, ‘Dude — Lamb of God saved someone’s life today.’ I said, ‘No, you saved someone’s life today. Lamb of God just helped you a little.”

In 2019 Blythe auctioned off his gold album plaque for Lamb Of God's 2006 album Sacrament along with hand-written lyrics to the band's hit song “Again We Rise”, in order to benefit Libby's Legacy, a charity working to fight breast cancer.

While surfing with his friend Carlos in Ecuador in 2020, Blythe and his friend decided to begin a project where the two bought a large piece of land in the country to help replant trees in the area to combat deforestation. In 2022 Blythe released a mini documentary titled Rewilding where he showed the progress that he made so far as well as raising awareness on the issue.

In 2024 Blythe auctioned off a framed photo that he had taken of Glenn Danzig, with all proceeds going to Hurricane Helene & Milton Victims.

On July 5, 2025, Blythe and his band Lamb of God performed at Ozzy Osbourne farewell concert Back to the Beginning. The concert itself was a charity event however Blythe was given a special pair of shoes signed by Osbourne. Blythe then auctioned off the shoes to raise even more money.

Blythe also does work with the Living the Dream Foundation which works with terminally ill children and has granted multiple children wishes.

=== Political views ===
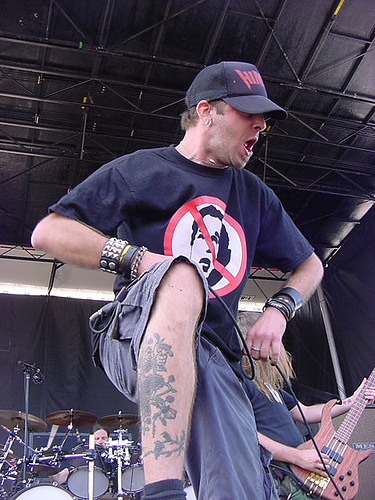
Blythe wearing an anti George W. Bush shirt at Ozzfest in 2004

Blythe’s lyrics are known to be political; he was highly critical of George W. Bush during his presidency along with U.S. foreign intervention in the Middle East. Many of the lyrics from Lamb Of God's 2004 album Ashes of The Wake were his take on the war on terror. In 2004, Blythe told Now Toronto “The best I can do is talk to people and write about it, and hope that people will open their eyes, stop being such apathetic cows and vote” “We have got to get that monkey out of the office before he kills us all.”

Blythe does not identify with any political ideology or party and has claimed that both Democrats and Republicans “play both side of the same coin” and don’t truly care about the American people. In a 2021 interview with Blabbermouth.net he commented on the subject stating "I don't define myself as liberal or conservative or Democratic or Republican," "Just because you speak on a certain issue... And that's a problem in our country today, on both the left and the right, is this knee-jerk reaction, that if you disagree with some sort of issue, because things are so polarized right now, then automatically you're painted as A or B, and that's idiotic; that's simply moronic.”

Blythe supports environment protection, and has been critical of current U.S. President Donald Trump. He has also been critical of United States Immigration and Customs Enforcement, calling them "fascists" in a 2026 blog post.

=== Religious beliefs ===
Blythe grew up going to a Southern Baptist church. Around age 7–8 he began observing what he perceived as hypocrisy in church attendees and how they treated others and what they said behind the scenes. This led him to think: “This is all bullshit.” Despite this, Blythe has stated that he is not an atheist. He has claimed this realization came to him while he was struggling with alcohol when nothing else was left, he said he asked “something outside myself for help.” This ultimately led to him believing in a higher power. In a 2025 interview he stated: “So, do I believe in a God, for lack of a better term? Yes. Do I attempt to have a conscious contact with that quote-unquote God? Yes, on a daily basis. Really, the main point of it is, do I know what that God is? Absolutely not. No clue. It doesn’t fucking matter.”

== Discography ==
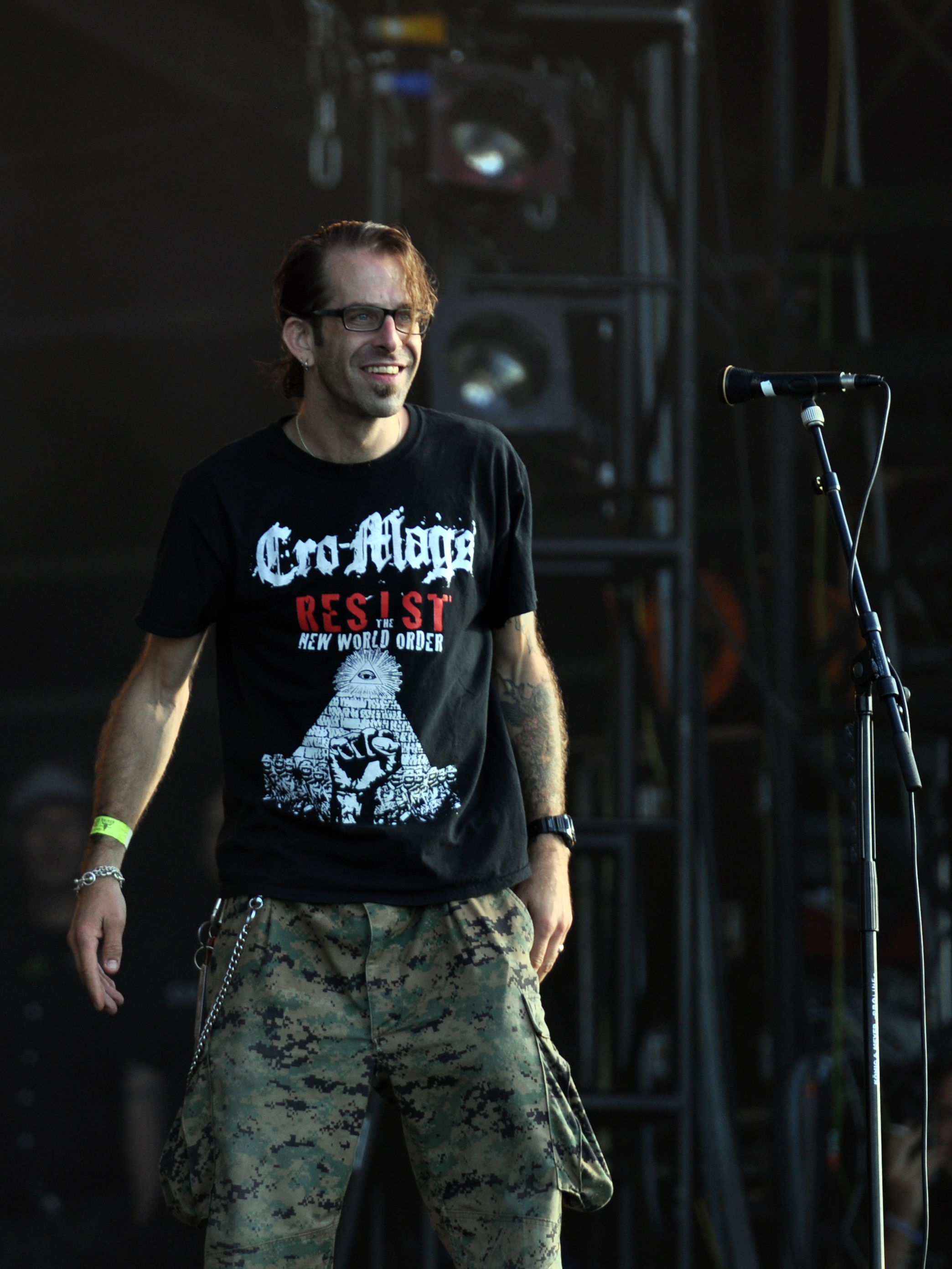
Blythe at Wacken Open Air 2013

=== Guest appearances ===
- The Mercury Lift (2003) by Haste − guest vocals on "God Reclaims His Throne"
- Without Any Remorse (2004) by Bloodshoteye − guest vocals on "F.U.B.A.R"
- Hunter (2005) by A Life Once Lost − guest vocals on "Vulture"
- Immortalis (2007) by Overkill − guest vocals on "Skulls and Bones"
- Iron Gag (2007) by A Life Once Lost − guest vocals on "Pigeonholed"
- Absentee (2008) by Pitch Black Forecast − guest vocals on "So Low"
- Lesser Traveled Waters (2008) by Gollum − guest vocals on "Cross-Pollenation"
- The Way of All Flesh (2008) by Gojira − guest vocals on "Adoration for none"
- Icons of the Illogical (2009) by The Kris Norris Projekt – lead vocals
- Retribution (2009) by Shadows Fall − guest vocals on "King of Nothing"
- Jasta (2011) by Jasta – guest vocals on "Enslaved, Dead or Depraved"
- Tour dates with Chthonic in Taiwan as guest vocals
- Cannabis Corpse (2012) – guest vocals on the 'Cory Smoot Memorial' show
- Suicide Silence (2012) – "You Only Live Once" (vocals) at the Ending is the Beginning: Mitch Lucker Memorial Show
- Teenage Time Killers (2015) – guest vocals on "Hung Out to Dry"
- Metal Allegiance (2015) – guest vocals on "Gift of pain"
- Aquatic Occult (2016) by Sourvein – guest vocals on "Ocypuss"
- Westfield Massacre (2016) – guest vocals on "Underneath the Skin"
- Deafheaven (2016) – guest vocals (live) on "Dream House" at Hollywood, California
- Ironshore (2016) by Oni – guest vocals on "The Only Cure"
- Bloodlust (2017) by Body Count – guest vocals on "Walk with Me…"
- Doyle II: As We Die (2017) by Doyle – guest vocals on "Virgin Sacrifice"
- Souls of the Revolution (2017) by ChthoniC – guest vocals
- Outlaws 'til the End: Vol. 1 (2018) by DevilDriver – guest vocals on "Whiskey River"
- Ritual (2018) by Soulfly – guest vocals on "Dead Behind the Eyes"
- Anesthetic (2019) by Mark Morton – guest vocals on "Truth Is Dead" (with Alissa White-Gluz of Arch Enemy)
- Ategnatos (2019) by Eluveitie – guest vocals/narration on "Worship"
- The Weathermaker Vault Series, Volume 1 (2020) by Clutch – guest vocals on "Passive Restraints"
- Veritas (2024) by P.O.D. – guest vocals on "Drop"
- Lacuna Coil (2024) – guest vocals on "Hosting the Shadow"

== Filmography ==
Film
| Year | Title | Role | Notes |
|---|---|---|---|
| 2009 | The Graves | Deacon Luke | |
| 2017 | Tshiong | Himself | Cameo |
| 2020 | Hairmetal Shotgun Zombie Massacre: The Movie | Sound Guy | |

Television
| Year | Title | Role | Notes |
|---|---|---|---|
| 2021 | Paradise City | Dom | 6 episodes (TV spinoff of American Satan) |

== Bibliography ==
| Year | Title |
|---|---|
| 2015 | Dark Days: A Memoir |
| 2025 | Just Beyond the Light |

== Awards and nominations ==
| Year | Award | Category | Result |
|---|---|---|---|
| 2011 | Revolver Magazine | 100 Greatest Living Rock Stars | Won |
| 2012 | Loudwire Music Awards | Vocalist of the Year | Nominated |
| 2013 | Loudwire Music Awards | Rock Titan of the Year | Nominated |
| 2015 | Loudwire Music Awards | Male Vocalist of the Year | Nominated |
