= Burn the Priest =

Studio album by Burn the Priest
- Released: April 4, 1999
- Recorded: November 1998
- Genre: Groove metal; death metal; thrash metal
- Length: 40:26
- Label: Legion
- Producer: Chris Adler; Steve Austin

Burn the Priest chronology
Burn the Priest (1999)	Legion: XX (2018)

Lamb of God chronology
Burn the Priest (1999)	New American Gospel (2000)

2005 reissue cover

Professional ratings
Review scores
Source	Rating
Allmusic	4/5 stars

Burn the Priest is the debut studio album by the American heavy metal band Burn the Priest. It was released on April 4, 1999, by Legion Records. It was the band's only release before being re-named to Lamb of God until the release of Legion: XX (2018), and also the only album by the band to feature guitarist Abe Spear.

== Track listing ==
All lyrics are written by Randy Blythe, except where noted; all music is composed by Burn the Priest, except where noted.

No.	Title	Lyrics	Music	Length
1.	"Bloodletting"			1:57
2.	"Dimera"	Blythe, Judd Prather		2:27
3.	"Resurrection #9"	Blythe, Steve Austin		5:15
4.	"Goatfish"			2:23
5.	"Salivation"			2:12
6.	"Lies of Autumn"			4:47
7.	"Chronic Auditory Hallucination"			3:53
8.	"Suffering Bastard"			2:07
9.	"Buckeye"			3:57
10.	"Lame"			1:51
11.	"Preaching to the Converted"			2:36
12.	"Departure Hymn"			2:36
13.	"Duane"		Burn the Priest, Matt Conner	2:17
14.	"Ruiner" (hidden track on original version)			2:08
Total length:				40:26

== Epic reissue ==
On Mar 22, 2005, the album was re-released by Epic Records. It has been remixed by Colin Richardson, remastered by Mark Wilder and features new liner notes by original producer Steve Austin (from noisecore band Today Is the Day). The cover art was changed in order to be store friendly, but retains the original artwork in the booklet. A live video of the song "Bloodletting", taken from the Killadelphia DVD, was included on an enhanced portion of the disc in QuickTime format.

The inlay of the CD case reads "Der Teufel nennt mich Bruder", German for "The Devil Calls Me Brother".

== Personnel ==
=== Burn the Priest ===
- Randy Blythe – vocals
- Mark Morton – guitar
- Abe Spear – guitar
- John Campbell – bass
- Chris Adler – drums

=== Additional personnel ===
- Chris Adler – production
- Michael Brosan – backing vocals
- Steve Austin – additional vocals on "Resurrection #9", production, engineering, mixing, mastering
- Remixed by Colin Richardson with Will Bartle (2005 reissue)
- Remastered by Mark Wilder (2005 reissue)
