= The Duke (EP) =

EP by Lamb of God
- Released: November 18, 2016
- Genre: Groove metal; thrash metal
- Length: 22:13
- Label: Nuclear Blast Records
- Producer: Josh Wilbur

Lamb of God chronology
VII: Sturm und Drang (2015)	The Duke (2016)	Lamb of God (2020)

The Duke is an extended play (EP) by the American heavy metal band Lamb of God. It was released in honor of Wayne Ford, a fan and a friend of the band who was diagnosed with leukemia and died in February 2015. The EP features two new tracks "Culling" and the titular track which was directly inspired by Ford. The other songs on the EP consist of live recordings from their 2015 album VII: Sturm und Drang which were taken from their performances at Bonnaroo Music & Arts Festival and Rock Am Ring.

The EP debuted at Number 85 on the Billboard 200, and "The Duke" became the bands second song to reach the US Mainstream Rock chart peaking at number 40.

== Critical reception ==
Professional ratings
Review scores
Source	Rating
AllMusic	3/5 stars
Metal Injection	7/10
Metal.de	5/10

Metal Injection wrote on the EP, stating:

The real meat is in the two new studio offerings. "The Duke" is obviously a tribute to Mr. Ford, and features some interesting, uncharacteristically clean vocals from Randy Blythe. There's a real 90's vibe to this song, but the riffs deftly sidestep any dubious nu metal trappings that might have sandbagged the track. Blythe even indulges in screamo affectations on the bridge which suit him immensely. "Culling" is a more traditional NWOAHM affair, a mix of mid-paced thrash and old school groove metal that features the band effortlessly rocking out. Could make a fine concert staple.

James Monger of AllMusic noted that the EP "boasts a trio of live cuts and a pair of studio tracks, the latter of which should help to satiate fans until the hard-charging metal unit's next full-length."

== Track listing ==
All tracks are written by Lamb of God.

No.	Title	Length
1.	"The Duke"	4:31
2.	"Culling"	3:32
3.	"Still Echos (Live from Rock Am Ring)"	4:34
4.	"512 (Live From Bonnaroo)"	4:48
5.	"Engage the Fear Machine (Live from Bonnaroo)"	4:48
Total length:		29:39

== Personnel ==
Credits adapted from the album's liner notes and Tidal.

Lamb of God

- Randy Blythe – vocals
- Mark Morton – guitar
- Willie Adler – guitar
- John Campbell – bass
- Chris Adler – drums

Technical

- Josh Wilbur — producer, engineer, mastering
- Kyle McAulay — engineer
- Nick Rowe — engineer
- Paul Suarez — engineer
- Charles Park — assistant
- Nick Zagorin — assistant
- Ken Adams — art direction

== Charts ==
Chart (2016)	Peak position
UK Albums Chart Update (OCC)	100
UK Album Downloads (OCC)	80
UK Independent Albums (OCC)	30
UK Rock & Metal Albums (OCC)	15
US Billboard 200	85
Top Rock & Alternative Albums (Billboard)	11
Top Hard Rock Albums (Billboard)	6
Top Rock Albums (Billboard)	11
