= 512 (song) =

Single by Lamb of God

from the album VII: Sturm und Drang
- Released: June 8, 2015
- Recorded: 2015
- Genre: Groove metal
- Length: 4:44
- Label: Epic; Nuclear Blast
- Songwriters: John Campbell; Chris Adler; Randy Blythe; Mark Morton; Willie Adler
- Producer: Josh Wilbur

Lamb of God singles chronology
"Still Echoes" (2015)	"512" (2015)	"Overlord" (2015)

"512" is the second single from the heavy metal band Lamb of God, from their eighth album VII: Sturm und Drang. It was released on June 8, 2015. The song was nominated for a Grammy Award for Best Metal Performance at the 58th Annual Grammy Awards.

== Background ==
Blythe wrote the lyrics for the song, in Pankrác Prison cell number 512, while in custody during his manslaughter case. The song is about contemplating how the experience was changing him. According to Blythe, most of his time was spent in a basement dungeon. He said the guards put him there so they could monitor him for depression. "They stick you in the worst, dimmest, darkest place in the prison," he says. "I couldn't even see the sun to tell what part of the day it was. It was just steadily lessening levels of gloom."

== Music video ==
The video follows a group of teens drinking under a bridge, who find the dead body of a young girl washed up on a riverbank. As the girl is mourned, the rest of the video follows the girls killer as her spirit appears throughout the rest of the video.

The music video was produced by Jorge Torres-Torres.

== Reception ==
In an interview with Rolling Stone, Gene Simmons of KISS praised the songs backing track however he was critical of the song’s vocals.

The song garnered the band their 5th Grammy Award nomination for Best Metal Performance at the 58th Annual Grammy Awards. However it lost to lost to "Cirice" by Ghost. It was also nominated for Best Metal Song of the year at the 2015 Loudwire Music Awards.

Loudwire dubbed "512" the 6th best metal song of 2015, and in 2020 Kerrang! named it the bands 6th best song.

== Live performances ==
Lamb of God performed the song on Jimmy Kimmel Live! on August 27, 2015.

== Charts ==
Chart (2015)	Peak position
US Hard Rock Didgital Song Sales (Billboard)	21
