= Overlord (song) =

Single by Lamb of God

from the album VII: Sturm und Drang
- Released: June 30, 2015
- Recorded: 2015
- Genre: Groove metal
- Length: 6:28
- Label: Epic; Nuclear Blast
- Songwriters: John Campbell; Chris Adler; Randy Blythe; Mark Morton; Willie Adler
- Producer: Josh Wilbur

Lamb of God singles chronology
"512" (2015)	"Overlord" (2015)	"Erase This" (2015)

"Overlord" is the third single from the heavy metal band Lamb of God, from their eighth album VII: Sturm und Drang. It became the bands first song to reach the US Mainstream Rock chart peaking at number 33. The song is notable for being the bands first to incorporated clean singing.

== Background ==
Lead singer Randy Blythe commented on the song stating "I wrote the song about the dangers of self-obsession in our distressingly myopic and increasingly entitled 'me-now/now-me' culture. Just like the couple in the video, many people can't seem to look past their own relatively small problems to see the bigger picture: the world is in serious trouble. Having a bad day at work, or a fight with your significant other, or getting a crappy haircut or table service does not in any way shape or form constitute an emergency. Sometimes things just don't work out the way we want them to, [so] deal with it."

== Music video ==
The music video was produced by Jorge Torres-Torres who worked in collaboration with Randy Blythe to create the video.

== Reception ==
Robert Pasbani of Metal Injection wrote "Lamb of God's new song "Overlord" is a huge, huge departure for the band. The first half of the song is perhaps the slowest tempo, most "hard rock" the band has ever sounded. We've certainly never heard frontman Randy Blythe sing clean vocals like this. Of course, about halfway through, the song kicks into high gear and the band returns to their more familiar sound, but this was still interesting to hear." Dave Pirtle of Last Rights added that the song "barely sounded like Lamb of God at all…for the first 3+ minutes anyway. The middle 2+ took things back into familiar territory before going back to the beginning to close."

== Charts ==
Chart (2015)	Peak position
US Mainstream Rock (Billboard)	33
