= Erase This =

Erase This may refer to:

- "Erase This", a song by Evanescence from Evanescence
- "Erase This", a song by Lamb of God from VII: Sturm und Drang
