= Into Oblivion (Lamb of God album) =

Studio album by Lamb of God
- Released: March 13, 2026
- Genres: Groove metal; metalcore
- Length: 39:16
- Labels: Century Media; Epic
- Producer: Josh Wilbur

Lamb of God chronology
Omens (2022)	Into Oblivion (2026)

Singles from Into Oblivion
- 1. "Sepsis" Released: October 2, 2025; 2. "Parasocial Christ" Released: November 21, 2025; 3. "Into Oblivion" Released: January 15, 2026; 4. "Blunt Force Blues" Released: February 27, 2026

Into Oblivion is the tenth studio album by American heavy metal band Lamb of God. It was released on March 13, 2026 through Century Media Records and Epic Records.

== Background and recording ==
Lead vocalist Randy Blythe commented on the album's title and themes stating "In general, the album is about the ongoing and rapid breakdown of the social contract, particularly here in America. Things are acceptable now that would’ve horrified people just 20 years ago."

It was produced by Josh Wilbur, and was recorded in multiple locations, including Richmond, Virginia, Mark Morton's home studio and Blythe recorded his vocals at Redondo Beach, California's Total Access studio.

Guitarist Mark Morton commented on the recording process stating:

For me, the album is about having the space to breathe creatively and not feeling like we have to keep up with any trend or expectation, It feels nice to be untethered from any agenda beyond rallying around the notion of, ‘Let's just make music that we think is cool,’ which is really where it all started.

Drummer Art Cruz also revealed that this was the first album he recorded while sober, which resulted in him having a completely different approach on the album.

== Release and promotion ==
On October 2, 2025, Lamb of God released the album’s first single, “Sepsis,” which was accompanied by an official music video directed by Gianfranco Svagelj. The second single, “Parasocial Christ,” was released the following month on November 21, alongside an official music video.

On January 15, 2026, the band officially announced the album’s release date and released the third single, the title track “Into Oblivion,” with an official music video. The fourth and final single, “Blunt Force Blues,” was released on February 27.

During Into Oblivion’s release weekend, multiple listening parties were held in 35 different states, with more than 140 independent record stores celebrating the record’s release. The album sold 26,000 copies in US in its first week and debuted at number 21 on the Billboard 200.

Lamb of God is supporting the album with a North American headline tour from March 17 to April 26. Kublai Khan TX, Fit For An Autopsy and Sanguisugabogg are serving as support.

The title track “Into Oblivion” was featured in Fortnite Festival. It will also be featured in Madden 27.

== Critical reception ==
Professional ratings
Review scores
Source	Rating
Blabbermouth.net	8.5/10
Kerrang!	4/5
Lambgoat	6/10
Metal Hammer	4/5 stars
Sputnikmusic	4.7/5
AllMusic	3.5/5 stars

Kory Grow of Rolling Stone stated, that the "album's title track, released with a dimly lit music video (to match Blythe's dimly lit Weltanschauung) on Thursday, finds Blythe declaring himself "the bringer of the truth from which you run into oblivion." Nick Ruskell of Kerrang! professed that "Into Oblivion boils with this anxiety and anger, occasionally spilling into downright confusion at what Randy sees." Ruskell added "Even in the album’s moments of relative let-up – the picked verses of "El Vacío", "A Thousand Years", both of which take on a doomy, almost Alice In Chains-ish crawl – this energy, this fire under their arse, is still there. The band haven’t been mellowing lately, exactly, but they weren’t swinging with this much fight in them, either."

Blabbermouth.wrote "This is their finest album since (at least) 2015's VII: Sturm Und Drang and a vigorous restating of their original values, albeit with a few refined and sophisticated elements thrown in to keep the creative fires blazing." Ryan P of Sputnikmusic also gave the album a positive review stating "This album displays Lamb of God on their game to the highest degree. It's groovy as hell and as brutal as a four-ton truck hitting you at 100 miles per hour. As soon as you hit play on the title track and that first riff from Mark blasts you, you know you're in for one hell of a treat."

Stephen Miller of Metal Hammer claimed "The smart money would now be on Lamb Of God coming back every few years to release a decent collection of songs, with one or two standouts that get chucked into the live set that recall, but never match, any of their classic records from the past, right? Wrong. Into Oblivion is a mallet to the back of the skull to anyone who believed that Lamb Of God’s best days were behind them. It is, at the very, very least, their best album since 2012’s Resolution, and it might even top that."

Christopher Monger of AllMusic wrote " Randy Blythe's frustration with the destabilization and political dysfunction of his country via potent, timely singles like "Sepsis," "Parasocial Christ," and the scorching title track. Channeling the era’s existential collapse through a volatile blend of thrash, sludge, groove, and metalcore, Into Oblivion lives up to its name by confronting the void with a cleansing blast of sonic malevolence."

== Track listing ==
All lyrics are written by David Randall Blythe; all music is composed by Blythe, William Adler, John Campbell, and Mark Morton.

Into Oblivion track listing
No.	Title	Length
1.	"Into Oblivion"	3:34
2.	"Parasocial Christ"	3:20
3.	"Sepsis"	3:38
4.	"The Killing Floor"	4:16
5.	"El Vacío"	4:17
6.	"St. Catherine's Wheel"	4:05
7.	"Blunt Force Blues"	4:11
8.	"Bully"	4:13
9.	"A Thousand Years"	3:53
10.	"Devise / Destroy"	3:49
Total length:		39:16

Limited CD and LP edition bonus track
No.	Title	Length
11.	"Wire"	3:35

Japanese bonus track
No.	Title	Length
12.	"Children of the Grave" (Black Sabbath cover)	4:47

== Personnel ==
Credits adapted from the CD booklet.

=== Lamb of God ===
- D. Randall Blythe – vocals
- Mark Morton – lead guitar
- Willie Adler – rhythm guitar, keyboards, programming
- John Campbell – bass
- Art Cruz – drums

=== Production ===
- Josh Wilbur – production, mixing, engineering, mastering, keyboards, programming, sound design
- Willie Adler – sound design
- Kyle McAulay – engineering
- Will Beasley – engineering assistance
- Steve Ornest – engineering assistance

== Charts ==
Chart performance for Into Oblivion
Chart (2026)	Peak position
Australian Albums (ARIA)	16
Austrian Albums (Ö3 Austria)	36
Belgian Albums (Ultratop Flanders)	27
Belgian Albums (Ultratop Wallonia)	13
Canadian Albums (Billboard)	100
Dutch Vinyl Albums (Dutch Charts)	28
Finnish Albums (Suomen virallinen lista)	16
French Albums (SNEP)	103
French Rock & Metal Albums (SNEP)	4
German Albums (Offizielle Top 100)	17
German Rock & Metal Albums (Offizielle Top 100)	8
Japanese Albums (Oricon)	49
Japanese Rock Albums (Oricon)	8
Japanese Top Albums Sales (Billboard Japan)	46
New Zealand Albums (RMNZ)	35
Scottish Albums (Official Charts)	6
Swedish Hard Rock Albums (Sverigetopplistan)	4
Swedish Physical Albums (Sverigetopplistan)	6
Swiss Albums (Schweizer Hitparade)	13
UK Albums (Official Charts)	48
UK Rock & Metal Albums (Official Charts)	2
US Billboard 200	21
US Top Rock & Alternative Albums (Billboard)	3
US Top Hard Rock Albums (Billboard)	1
US Top Rock Albums (Billboard)	3
