= Omens (Lamb of God album) =

Studio album by Lamb of God
- Released: October 7, 2022
- Recorded: 2022
- Genre: Groove metal; thrash metal
- Length: 41:06
- Label: Epic; Nuclear Blast
- Producer: Josh Wilbur

Lamb of God chronology
Lamb of God (2020)	Omens (2022)	Into Oblivion (2026)

Omens is the ninth studio album by American heavy metal band Lamb of God. The album was released on October 7, 2022, through Epic Records and Nuclear Blast. It was produced by Josh Wilbur, who has collaborated with the band since 2006.

== Background ==
The band's previous album, the self-titled Lamb of God, was released in 2020 shortly after the outbreak of the COVID-19 pandemic. The band was unable to tour behind that album, thus disrupting their usual cycle of recording and releasing albums, with each followed by a supporting tour, The band was unaccustomed to the downtime in 2020–2021, so they decided to create a new album with Omens being written and developed more quickly than their previous albums. The album's release was accompanied by a documentary film called The Making Of: Omens, which is available at the band's website.

The album's lyrics are informed by the social upheavals experienced in the United States since 2020, including the debate over the history of the band's hometown of Richmond, Virginia in the song "Nevermore", plus awareness of international environmental issues informed by singer Randy Blythe's recent advocacy work with Indigenous communities in the United States and Ecuador. Blythe later stated in a press release "It's a very pissed-off record, It is extremely pissed off."

Most of the album was recorded live in the same room, as a departure from the online sharing of tracks that many bands had to adopt during the pandemic. Guitarist Mark Morton commented on the album stating "The inner workings of the band have never been better, You can hear it in Omens. You can see it in our performances, and if you're around us for five minutes, you can feel it."

== Release and promotion ==
The albums first single "Nevermore" was released on released on June 10, 2022, and was accompanied alongside and official music video. The albums title track was released as the second single on July 28, and included features from members of American Nightmare, H2O, Body Count, and Youth Code. The third and final single "Grayscale" was released on September 8, alongside a lyric video.

The album was officially released on October 7, 2022, Omens sold 19,000 copies in its first week, including 5,100 of pure vinyl sales. It debuted at No. 15 on the Billboard 200, and also debuted at the No. 1 of Top Hard Rock Albums, No. 3 of Album Sales, No. 3 of Top Rock Albums and No. 5 of Vinyl Albums.

To coincide with the album Lamb of God announced the Omens tour alongside Killswitch Engage. The tour began prior to the albums release on September 9, 2022 and went till October 20. It featured other acts such as Suicide Silence and Baroness on select dates.

== Critical reception ==
Professional ratings
Aggregate scores
Source	Rating
Metacritic	80/100
Review scores
Source	Rating
Kerrang!	4/5 stars
AllMusic	3.5/5 stars
Metal Injection	9/10
Metal Hammer	3.5/5 stars
Blabbermouth.net	8/10
NME	4/5 stars
Metal.de	7/10

Omens was met with "generally favorable" reviews from critics. At Metacritic, which assigns a weighted average rating out of 100 to reviews from mainstream publications, this release received an average score of 80, based on 5 reviews.

Kerrang! concluded that "Omens finds the Virginia metal bruisers returning sounding as reliably heavy, violent, and pissed-off as ever." According to Spin magazine, the album grabs "listeners by their prefrontal cortexes, shaking the metal faithful around to what the hell is going on as they blissfully mosh through the ruins of modern living."

Blabbermouth.net wrote "One of these days, LAMB OF GOD might make an album that truly confounds expectations, but "Omens" is smart, surprising and monstrously heavy enough to distract us until they do."

Metal Injection noted that the album mixes in some elements of other genres that have rarely appeared in Lamb of God releases before, including hardcore punk, and described "a genuine thread of palpable lament woven through every track". Distorted Sound also noticed the influence of hardcore punk, plus a "raw" feel arising from the live recording techniques used in the studio, and concluded that "Omens is another incredible album to add to an already stacked back catalogue that features just enough subtle additions to keep the band still sounding as fresh as ever."

== Track listing ==
All tracks are written by Lamb of God, except for "Wake Up Dead," written by Dave Mustaine.

Omens track listing
No.	Title	Length
1.	"Nevermore"	4:36
2.	"Vanishing"	4:49
3.	"To the Grave"	3:44
4.	"Ditch"	3:38
5.	"Omens"	3:48
6.	"Gomorrah"	4:12
7.	"Ill Designs"	3:41
8.	"Grayscale"	4:00
9.	"Denial Mechanism"	2:38
10.	"September Song"	6:00
Total length:		41:06

Japanese edition bonus track
No.	Title	Length
11.	"Evidence"	3:50
Total length:		44:56

Nuclear Blast mail-order exclusive limited-edition bonus tracks
No.	Title	Length
11.	"Evidence"	3:50
12.	"State of Unrest" (featuring Kreator)	3:08
13.	"Wake Up Dead" (featuring Dave Mustaine)	3:43
Total length:		51:47

== Personnel ==
Lamb of God

- D. Randall Blythe – vocals
- Mark Morton – guitar
- Willie Adler – guitar
- John Campbell – bass
- Art Cruz – drums

Technical

- Josh Wilbur – production, mastering, mixing, engineering
- Nick Rowe – engineering
- Mark Aguilar – engineering assistance

== Charts ==
Chart performance for Omens
Chart (2022)	Peak position
Australian Albums (ARIA)	61
Austrian Albums (Ö3 Austria)	16
Belgian Albums (Ultratop Flanders)	54
Belgian Albums (Ultratop Wallonia)	111
Canadian Albums (Billboard)	9
Dutch Albums (Album Top 100)	62
Finnish Albums (Suomen virallinen lista)	10
French Albums (SNEP)	110
German Albums (Offizielle Top 100)	21
Japanese Albums (Oricon)	76
Japanese Hot Albums (Billboard Japan)	84
Scottish Albums (OCC)	11
Spanish Albums (Promusicae)	85
Swiss Albums (Schweizer Hitparade)	14
UK Albums (OCC)	34
UK Independent Albums (OCC)	4
UK Rock & Metal Albums (OCC)	3
US Billboard 200	15
US Top Hard Rock Albums (Billboard)	1
US Top Rock Albums (Billboard)	3
