= Legion: XX =

Studio album of cover songs by Burn the Priest
- Released: May 18, 2018
- Studios: Hybrid Studios, Santa Ana, California
- Genres: Crossover thrash; hardcore punk; sludge metal
- Length: 38:02
- Labels: Epic; Nuclear Blast
- Producer: Josh Wilbur

Burn the Priest chronology
Burn the Priest (1999)	Legion: XX (2018)

Lamb of God overall chronology
VII: Sturm und Drang (2015)	Legion: XX (2018)	Lamb of God (2020)

Singles from Legion: XX
- 1. "Inherit the Earth" Released: March 23, 2018; 2. "I Against I" Released: May 10, 2018; 3. "Kerosene" Released: May 17, 2018

Professional ratings
Review scores
Source	Rating
Distorted Sound	7/10
Exclaim!	8/10
Metal Injection	9/10
Metal Hammer	4/5 stars
MetalSucks	3/5 stars

Legion: XX is a cover album and the second studio album by American heavy metal band Burn the Priest, also known as Lamb of God. The title pays homage to Legion Records which was the independent label that released the band's first 7" split in 1998, with this release being twenty years later.

Legion: XX was released on May 18, 2018 through Epic Records/Nuclear Blast. It is the last album to feature founding drummer Chris Adler before his departure from Lamb of God in July 2019.

== Musical style ==
Legion: XX has been described as a crossover thrash, hardcore punk, and sludge metal album.

== Track listing ==
No.	Title	Writer(s)	Original artist (year)	Length
1.	"Inherit the Earth"	Tommy Niemeyer	The Accüsed (1988)	3:29
2.	"Honey Bucket"	Buzz Osborne; Dale Crover	Melvins (1993)	2:43
3.	"Kerosene"	Steve Albini; Santiago Durango; Dave Riley	Big Black (1986)	6:12
4.	"Kill Yourself"	Billy Milano; Scott Ian; Dan Lilker; Charlie Benante	Stormtroopers of Death (1985)	2:18
5.	"I Against I"	Paul Hudson; Gary Miller; Darryl Jenifer	Bad Brains (1986)	3:48
6.	"Axis Rot"	Andrew Sigler; Mark Smoot; Randolph Dugan; Robert Guess; Ron Demmick	Sliang Laos (1993)	3:04
7.	"Jesus Built My Hotrod"	Al Jourgensen; Paul Barker; Michael Balch; Bill Rieflin; Gibby Haynes	Ministry feat. Gibby Haynes (1992)	6:13
8.	"One Voice"	Roger Miret; Matt Henderson; Craig Stefari	Agnostic Front (1992)	3:16
9.	"Dine Alone"	Walter Schreifels; Tom Capone; Sergio Vega; Alan Cage	Quicksand (1993)	3:31
10.	"We Gotta Know"	John Joseph; Parris Mitchell Mayhew; Harley Flanagan	Cro-Mags (1986)	3:27
Total length:				38:02

Bonus track
No.	Title	Writer(s)	Original artist (year)	Length
11.	"In the Meantime"	Page Hamilton	Helmet (1992)	3:13
Total length:				41:15

== Personnel ==
Burn the Priest

- Randy Blythe – vocals
- Mark Morton – guitar
- Willie Adler – guitar
- John Campbell – bass
- Chris Adler – drums

Production

- Josh Wilbur – production, mixing, engineering
- Brad Blackwood – mastering
- Josh Brooks – mixing
- Kyle McAulay – mixing
- Lana Migliore – mixing
- Nick Rowe – mixing

== Charts ==
Chart (2018)	Peak position
Canadian Albums (Billboard)	53
Scottish Albums (Official Charts)	72
Billboard 200	107
