= The Duke (song) =

Single by Lamb of God

from the EP The Duke
- Released: October 20, 2016
- Recorded: 2015
- Genre: Groove metal
- Length: 4:32
- Label: Nuclear Blast
- Songwriter: Randy Blythe
- Producer: Josh Wilbur

Lamb of God singles chronology
"Embers" (2015)	"The Duke" (2016)	"Culling" (2016)

"The Duke" is the title track and only single from Lamb of God's 2016 EP The Duke. The song was released on October 20, 2016, and is dedicated to Wayne Ford who was a fan of the band that died of Leukemia in 2015. The song reached number 40 on the US Mainstream Rock chart.

== Overview ==
Lead singer Randy Blythe wrote "The Duke" in dedication of a fan he befriended in 2012 that was named Wayne Ford, who died of leukemia in 2015. In a press release Blythe stated:

A little while ago I became friends with a fan named Wayne Ford – he was terminal – leukemia. I talked with him often, even video chatted him into the studio. He was very calm about his impending death, and we discussed it very openly. I learned a lot from him. This song is for him.

Some of the songs lyrical themes came from things Ford had said to Blythe, others came from a conversation Blythe had with his wife. Blythe originally asked Ford if there was any message he wanted incorporated into the song. His idea was to have him say it over the phone and then layer them into the record, or take the words and work them into a song's lyrics. However Ford never got back to Blythe on the offer.

The songs title is in reference to actor John Wayne’s nickname "Duke" who Ford was a fan of.

After the song's release and its association with the bone-marrow / stem-cell donor registration organisation Be the Match (run by the National Marrow Donor Program), a man named Todd Seaman from Arkansas, who had registered thanks in part to hearing "The Duke", was matched with a 65-year-old leukemia patient and donated stem cells/plasma. Blythe later posted on his Instagram "To say that I am honored to have been a small part of this is a massive understatement. Yesterday Todd said, ‘Dude — Lamb of God saved someone’s life today.’ I said, ‘No, you saved someone’s life today. Lamb of God just helped you a little."

== Reception ==
Justin Pentrick of Echos and Dust wrote "The Duke’ is a great song with plenty of hooks and the opening riff is really something to behold. The song starts off heavy enough but moves into a slower pace for the first quarter. When it does kick in, the opening riff continues and the band just explodes with power." Loudwire stated that "The Duke" is an "atypical song that takes on a somber mood and a hard rock edge that sees Randy Blythe deliver soothing clean vocals." New Noise Magazine added "The Duke" comes in with gentle notes, to then kick in with a solid groove. The majority of the track features Blythe’s clean vocals, but this time around there is much more of an energy backing them up (where as “Overlord” leaned more towards being a relaxed track). The cleans are incredibly catchy.

Metal Injection noted that the song "features some interesting, uncharacteristically clean vocals from Randy Blythe." Adding "There's a real 90's vibe to this song, but the riffs deftly sidestep any dubious nu metal trappings that might have sandbagged the track."

== Charts ==
Chart (2016)	Peak position
US Mainstream Rock (Billboard)	40
US US Hard Rock Digital (Billboard)	19
