= Randy Blythe manslaughter case =

Court case in the Czech Republic

Randy Blythe manslaughter trial
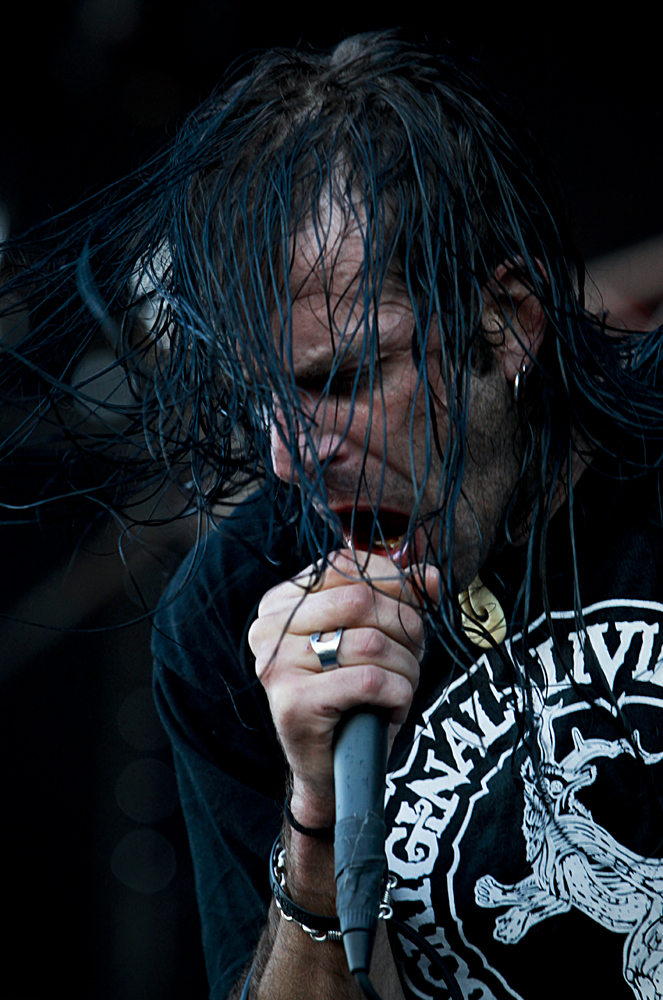
- Blythe at Optimus Alive! 2009
- Court: High Court in Prague
- Decided: June 5, 2013

Case history
- Appealed from: Municipal Court in Prague (presiding Tomáš Kubovec)

Court membership
- Judges sitting: Jiří Lněnička (presiding)

The Randy Blythe manslaughter case was a court case in the Czech Republic, stemming from a 2010 Lamb of God concert in Prague, wherein 19-year-old fan Daniel Nosek sustained head injuries leading to a coma and death. During the investigation, Czech police unsuccessfully asked United States authorities for cooperation. When the band returned to the Czech Republic for another concert two years later, its vocalist Randy Blythe was arrested, charged with causing Nosek's death, and remanded in custody for five weeks.

According to a verdict delivered by the Municipal Court in Prague on March 5, 2013, it was proven that Blythe had thrown Nosek offstage and thus had moral responsibility for his death. However, due to the circumstances, Blythe was not held criminally liable, and most of the blame lay with promoters and security members. The acquittal was upheld by the Prague High Court on June 5, 2013.

The trial was documented in the film As the Palaces Burn, directed by Don Argott.

== 2010 concert incident ==
It was a heavy metal show, people jump up on stage and go crazy and all this other stuff. It's standard. That happens every single day [at Lamb of God shows].

— Randy Blythe in August 10, 2012 interview with KROQ-FM.

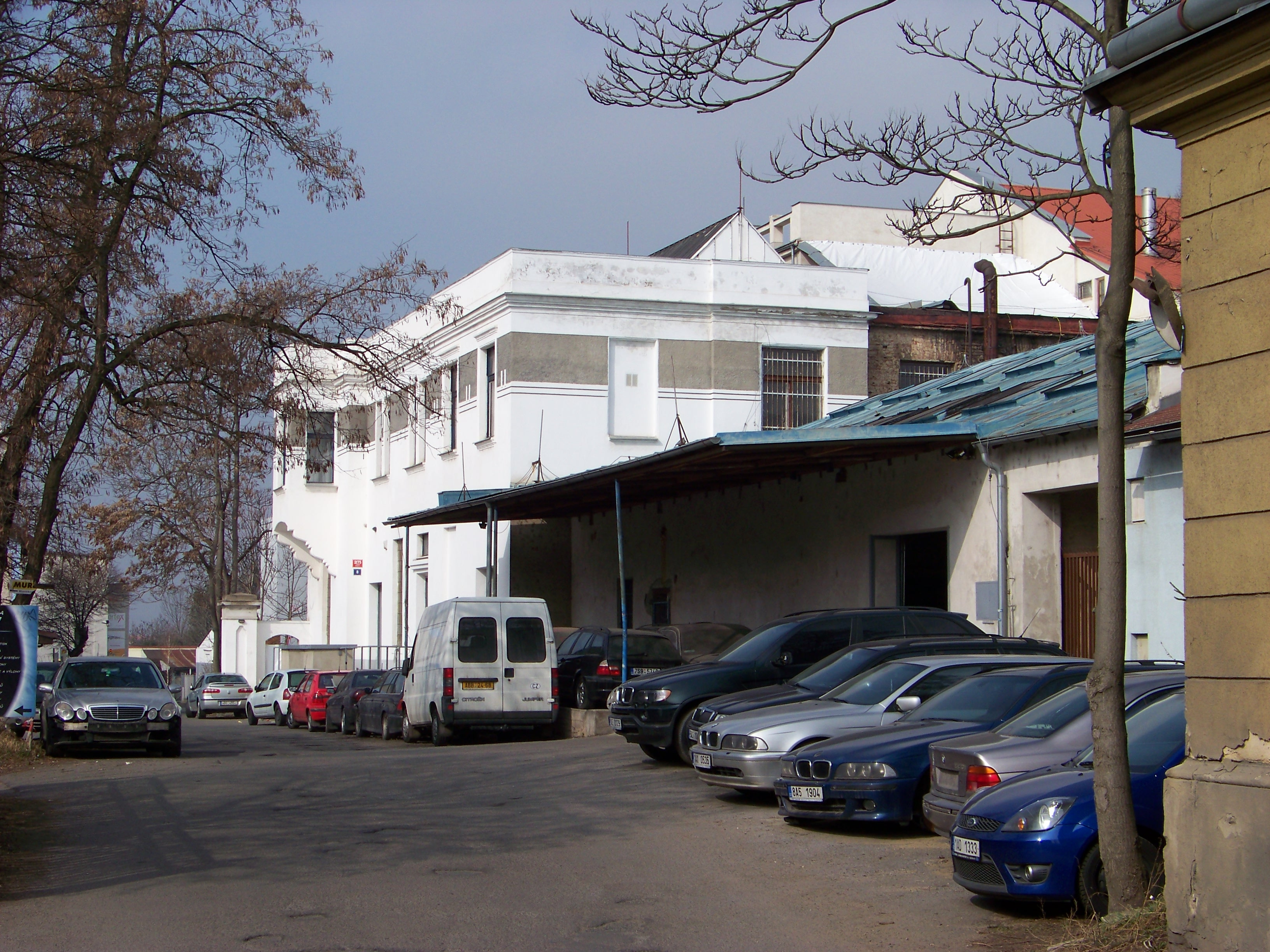
Street Na Košince in front of club Abaton (the white building in the back)

During a concert on May 24, 2010, in the Prague club, Abaton, Blythe was involved in an incident that resulted in the death of Daniel Nosek, a 19-year-old attending fan. According to eyewitness statements cited by the Czech online daily newspaper aktuálně.cz following Blythe's arrest, Blythe was chanting "Come on!" between songs, which, the newspaper stated, may have been intended to invite applause from the audience and not a direct invitation to fans to approach the stage. The newspaper went on to report that the fan tried to climb onstage and was thrown by the singer from the stage, falling backwards directly on his head. According to the same paper, Nosek was not under the influence of drugs or alcohol, suffered serious brain trauma, fell into a coma, and died weeks later from his injuries.

A report about the concert at issue released on May 26, 2010 by topzine.cz stated that "one of the things that was unexpected was the behavior of the singer Randall Blythe, who on a few occasions struck some fans in a relatively brutal way off the stage." The article also contains pictures, one of them showing Blythe holding a fan down on the ground. Meanwhile, another report released two days after the concert by metalopolis.net alleged that "Randy in a totally uncompromising way took down an impertinent fan, who has climbed the podium several times. The front-man clearly showed that it is his territory, he struck the intruder down, punched him a couple of times and sent him through the air off the podium, without even stopping singing (!)" On May 28, 2010, the report by marastmusic.com stated that "some broken heads was a testimony to the fact that the band does not like anybody on the stage", while abysszine.com stated that "the only negative thing about the concert was, to say it mildly, disputable approach of the band towards the stage-divers ... when somebody tried to climb the stage, he was brutally swept down."

Following Blythe's arrest, Tomáš Fiala, a promoter of the concert, said that there was no fight between the fan and Blythe, and that "it was an unfortunate incident which happened during the concert when someone climbed onto the stage where he was not supposed to be." According to the Lamb of God publicist Adrenaline PR, "[the] incident deals with a fan that three times during the concert jumped the barricade and rushed Randy during the performance. It is alleged that the third time, security was not able to reach him and that Randy pushed him back into the audience where supposedly he fell and hit his head." However, it was revealed during the trial that it was a different fan who previously got into contact with Blythe than Nosek. Guitarist Willie Adler said, "I can't recall that particular show, let alone a fan being beaten on the stage. I think I would've noticed something like that considering the Dime thing."

According to Blythe's attorney Martin Radvan, the police launched an investigation following the death of Nosek, about a month after the concert and following a coma. After interviewing several eyewitnesses from the concert, the police asked the United States Department of Justice to take part in the investigation; however, they refused to cooperate and, moreover, did not notify anyone from Lamb of God or its management.

== Arrest and charges ==
On June 27, 2012, Blythe was arrested by the Czech police on suspicion of manslaughter. Lamb of God was prepared to play in Prague on June 28, 2012, but Blythe's arrest upon arrival at Ruzyně Airport caused the concert to be canceled.

According to TV Nova, Blythe stated that he had not been aware of Nosek's death and expressed his remorse.

A police spokesperson stated on June 29, 2012 that the police had formally charged Blythe under section 146(4) of the Czech Criminal Code, which contains intentional infliction of bodily harm resulting in death (i.e. manslaughter). He faced 5–10 years of imprisonment if found guilty.

== Court remand and bail ==
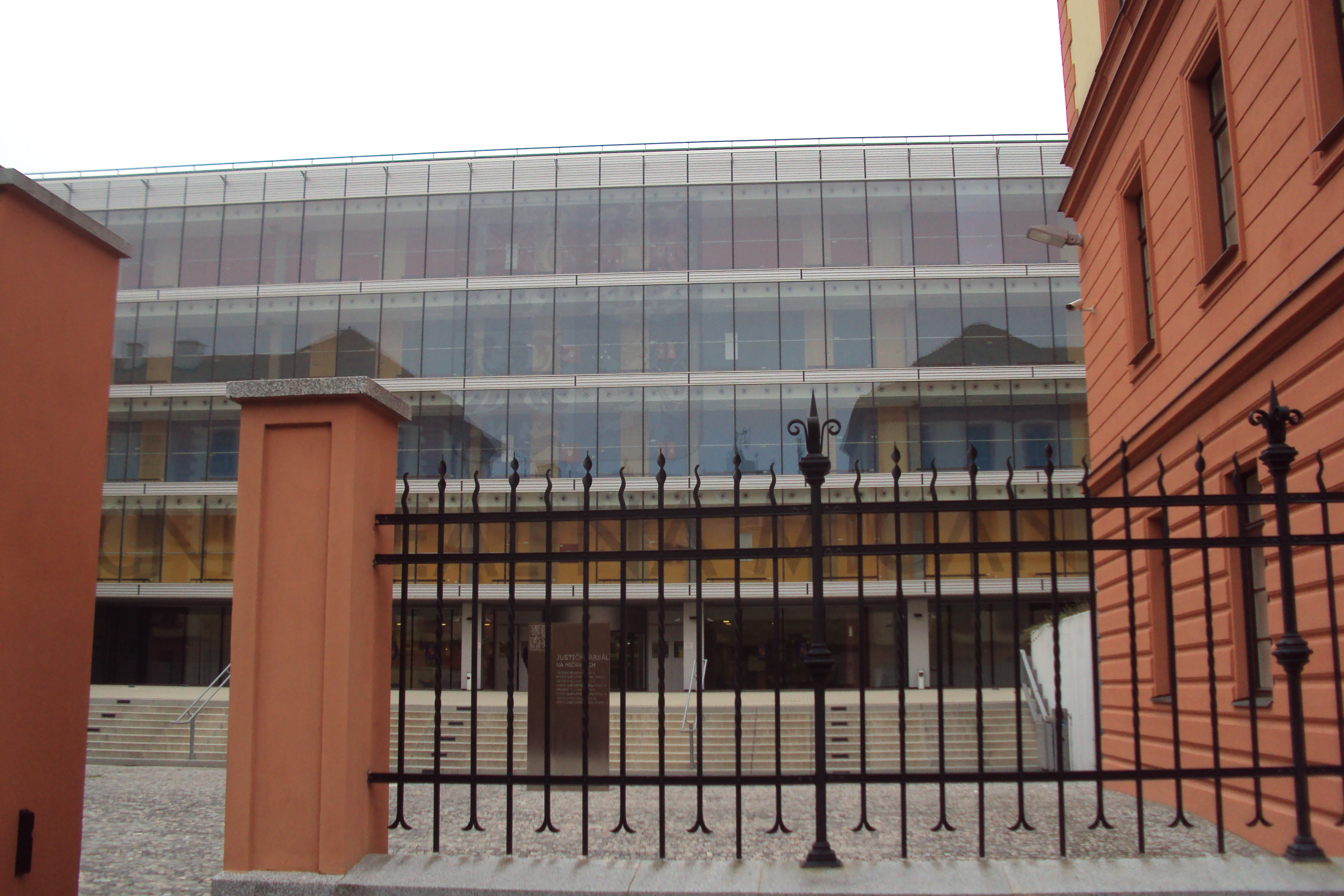
Justice compound Na Mičánkách, the seat of Prague 8 district court which was deciding on Blythe's remand and bail

On June 30, 2012, the State Attorney brought a motion to remand Blythe in pre-trial detention, as he considered Blythe a flight risk. During a hearing conducted the same day, judge Petr Fassati of the Prague 8 District Court ruled that Blythe would be held on remand, with the possibility of a bail of CZK 4,000,000 (~ US$ 200,000), Blythe's alleged annual income; Blythe was held in Pankrác Prison. Bail was deposited in the court's bank account on mid-day of July 3, 2012. After this, the State Attorney had three working days to either accept the bail or to challenge it by filing a complaint. Due to public holidays it was not until July 9, 2012, that the State Attorney filed his complaint, which was to be dealt with by appellate court, the Prague Municipal Court.

I am no flight risk. I am an international touring artist, I have to clear my name. So yes, I will come back here if I am called to court.

— Randy Blythe at the Prague Ruzyně Airport before
leaving the Czech Republic on August 3, 2012.

On July 17, 2012, Prague Municipal Court's panel of three judges headed by judge Luboš Vrba overturned the bail decision by doubling the bail amount to CZK 8 million (~ US$400,000). After this, the State Attorney challenged the conditions of release, trying to achieve that the bail is subject to Blythe staying in the country and/or Blythe having to report at a given police station regularly until the criminal proceedings are finished. On August 2, 2012, the appellate court rejected the State Attorney's second complaint and ordered Blythe's immediate release. Blythe left the Czech Republic the next day, claiming in an interview with TV Nova that he would return for the trial.

== Indictment and trial ==
On November 13, 2012, the spokesperson of the Prague State Attorney's Office announced that the police had formally closed their investigation and proposed to the State Attorney to indict Blythe. After reviewing the case file, the State Attorney indicted Blythe on the aforementioned charges on November 30, 2012. Two weeks later, a judge set the trial to commence on February 4, 2013, with a plan to conduct the hearings in four consecutive days. Blythe was summoned to attend the hearing in person.

The case was heard by a panel of the Prague Municipal Court, consisting of presiding professional judge Tomáš Kubovec and two lay judges. Trials in the Czech Republic are public. In general, the court is bound to decide on the deed as stated in the indictment; however, it is not bound by its legal assessment by the State Attorney.

Both the defendant and the State Attorney may appeal the decision; the appeal would be heard by a panel of the Prague High Court, consisting of three professional judges. A decision of second instance court is final and enforceable. Nevertheless, an extraordinary appeal may be lodged by the defendant or the Supreme State Attorney, which would be heard by the Supreme Court of the Czech Republic in Brno; an extraordinary appeal may, however, rest only on issues of law and does not provide for full review of the case. After exhausting all of these remedies, the defendant may also lodge a petition to the Constitutional Court of the Czech Republic. The petition may be based on allegation of violation of rights under the Czech Constitution and Charter of Fundamental Rights and Basic Freedoms.

=== State Attorney Vladimír Mužík ===
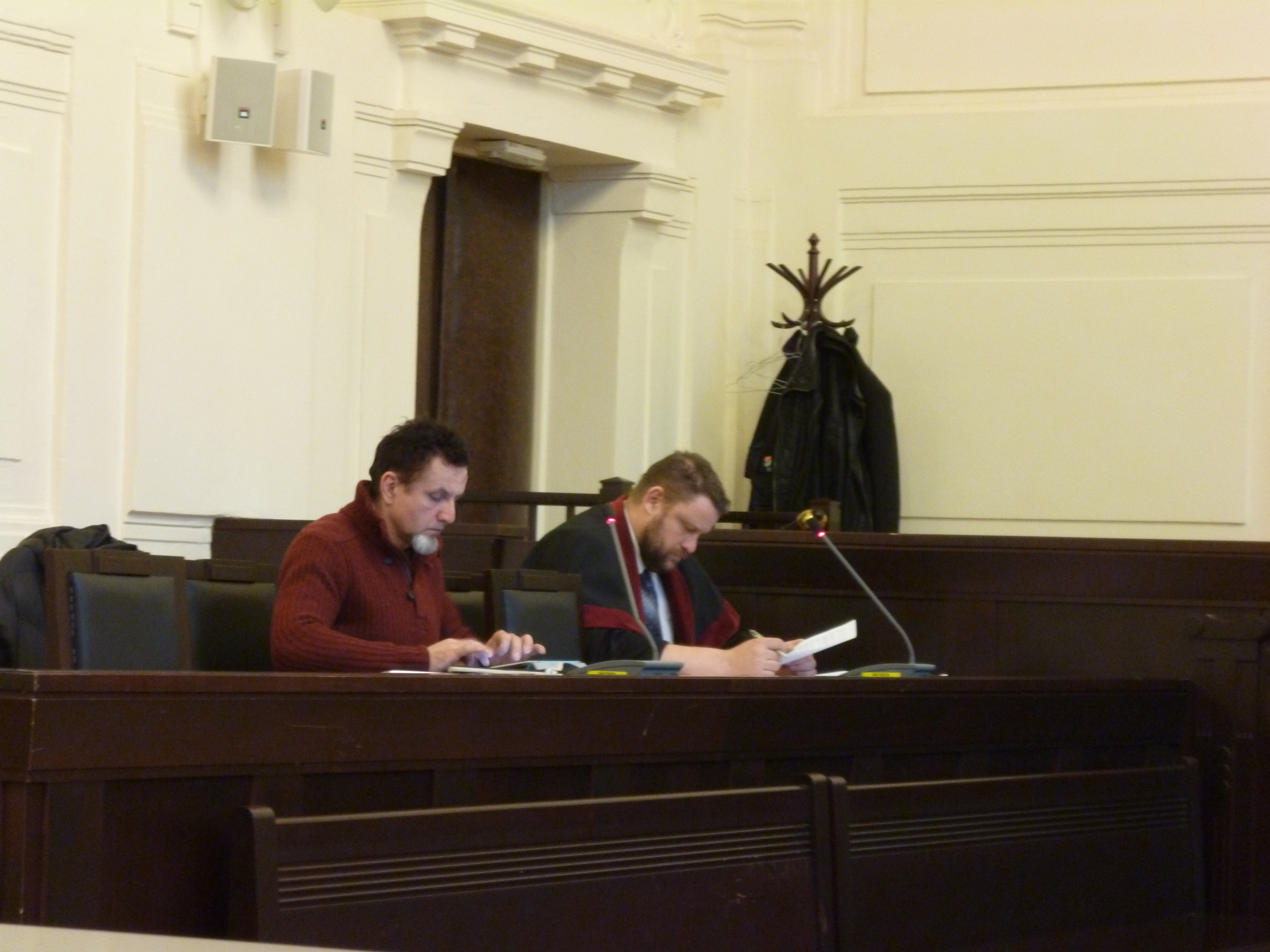
State Attorney Vladimír Mužík (right)

Indictment against Blythe was brought by State Attorney Vladimír Mužík. Mužík had tried a number of murderers, such as Luboš Mika (life in prison), Roman Fidler (life imprisonment at 1st instance, 25 years on appeal), Maria Zolotukinová (13 years imprisonment) and Petr Procházka (11 years imprisonment). He also tried a case against Andranik Soghojan, an alleged head of Russian mafia, requesting 25 years in prison for ordering a murder. The Municipal Court in Prague acquitted Soghojan due to lack of evidence; however, the decision was repealed on appeal by the High Court, and the case will be heard again by a different tribunal of the Municipal Court. Another of Mužík's murder cases which ended in acquittal due to insufficient evidence is that of Miroslav Rus, who was indicted in connection with disappearance of Miroslav Kříž, a vice-chairman of the Czech Football Association.

=== Defense lawyers ===
Randy Blythe was represented by Prague lawyers Martin Radvan and Vladimír Jablonský. Radvan studied law at the Faculty of Law of Charles University and New York University School of Law. From 1990 to 1992, he served as external advisor to the then-Prime Minister Marián Čalfa. A former partner at Baker & McKenzie, Radvan established Radvan & Co. in 1996. He is also a member of the board of directors of Forum 2000.

Jablonský gained fame as an attorney for his representation of Yekta Uzunoglu, a Kurdish national who was first charged in 1994 with preparing to commit three murders and committing blackmail and torture. His prosecution became one of the longest criminal cases in the Czech history, as the witnesses and alleged victims gradually withdrew or changed their testimonies against Uzunoglu until he was exonerated by the Municipal Court in Prague in 2007. The court held that although the crimes did take place, there is no evidence that Uzunoglu took part in them. Jablonský had also represented Pavel Nagy, who was indicted of accepting a bribe. The proceedings ended with Nagy being found insane and criminally not liable. Jablonský also acted as a defense attorney in the case of a hairdresser of Czech VIPs indicted on charges of rape and torture. During the proceedings, the judge sent Jablonský to face the disciplinary commission of the Czech bar association for what he perceived as "behaviour bordering on contempt".

=== Day 1 of the trial ===
David Randall Blythe intentionally threw the victim from a 98 centimeter high stage by approaching the victim from the side where the victim did not see him, he unexpectedly and with both hands and considerable force shoved the victim so that the victim fell over the guardrail and fell on the ground, hitting the back of his head, which led to brain hemorrhage.

— Indictment

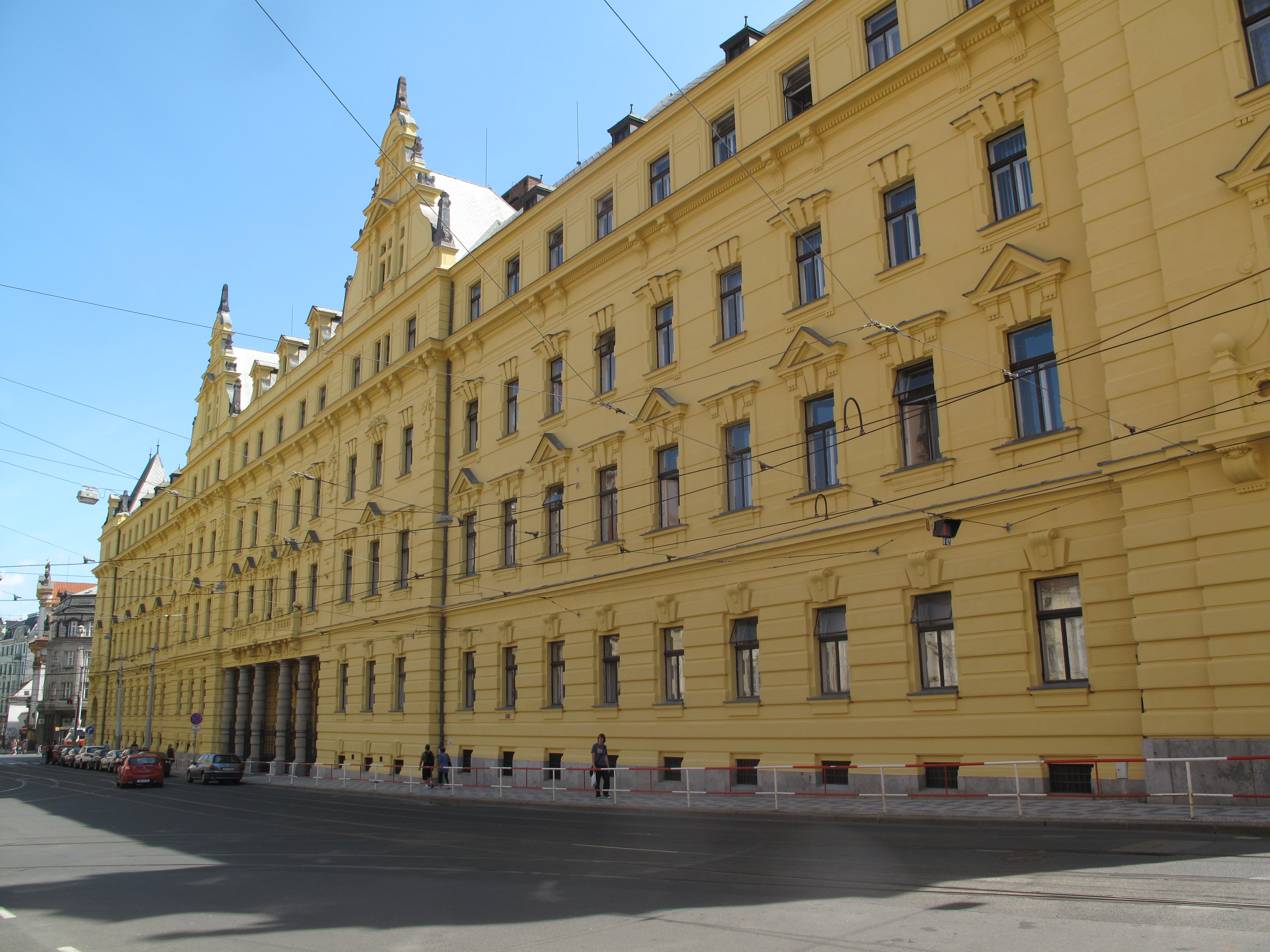
Prague Municipal Court, which was ruling on appeal against the bail and which is the first instance court for Blythe's case

The trial started on February 4, 2013. Blythe testified that when he wanted to see the club before the concert, Lamb of God's technician told him that the club was terrible and messy. According to Blythe, the technician went on, saying that the stage was small, there were too many people, and that it was rather dangerous.

Blythe, who is nearsighted, took off his glasses before entering the stage, which together with the smoke and light effects allegedly left him half-blind. Blythe said that people could easily reach the band members or climb up to the stage. One of the fans, who was identified as Milan Pořádek by Czech newspapers, and who was scheduled to testify later during the proceedings, managed to climb the stage twice without being stopped by security. Blythe testified that during the first attempt, Pořádek rushed the stage and started waving his arms before stage diving. The second time, he tried to put his arms around Blythe in an attempt to hug him. Blythe, who according to his own words perceived this as a danger, caught Pořádek's collar, pushed him on the ground, knelt on him and repeatedly told him to stop. He then led the fan by his hair to the edge of the stage, where the fan jumped off. It was only after watching a video of the incident that Blythe found out that a security officer was actually pushing the fan from back. Blythe further said that he saw Pořádek trying to reach the stage yet again before finally being stopped by security.

Later, when another fan tried to climb the stage, Blythe thought that it was Pořádek again. Blythe testified that he approached the fan and pushed him with both hands off of the stage in the belief that the crowd would catch him, which it did not. Jiří Choroš, author of video which caught the previous incidents with Pořádek, testified that the fan was for a moment lying on the ground with nobody helping him. Blythe further commented that he saw the fan get up and that other fans showed him thumbs up. Blythe insisted that he never saw Nosek nor came into contact with him. It was not until the arrest two years later that he found out about Nosek's death.

Blythe further testified that he was not under the influence of alcohol during the concert and that he had never used any drugs. Chris Adler, Lamb of God's drummer, testified that he had not seen anything from the back of the stage and further proclaimed that Blythe's aggressiveness is only a stage act. According to Adler, Blythe is a calm, moderate, and well-read person. The defense also presented videos from various Lamb of God concerts in order to demonstrate that metal music is very energetic and that Blythe regularly cheers to the crowd, but not to encourage people to climb the stage.

Blythe also alleged that after learning about Nosek's death, he had written a letter to the Nosek family, in which he offered help and a meeting in-person. Daniel Nosek's father, however, testified that the family has not been contacted by anyone from the band nor by the defense team. Nosek's father confirmed that his son had been healthy up until the day of the incident. The Nosek family's representative brought a claim for damages in the amount of CZK 10,000,000 (approx. US$530,000).

=== Day 2 of the trial ===
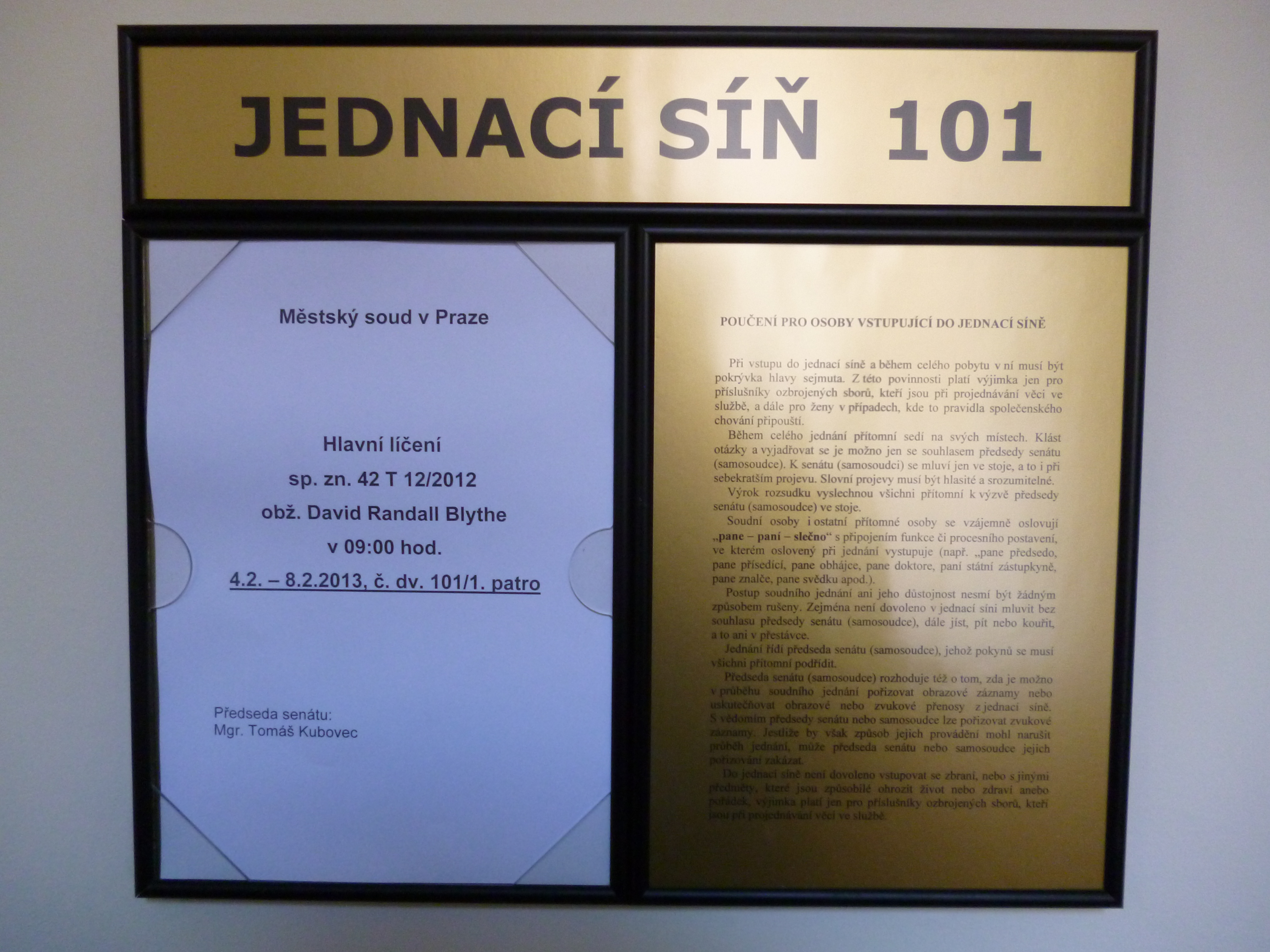
Courtroom list

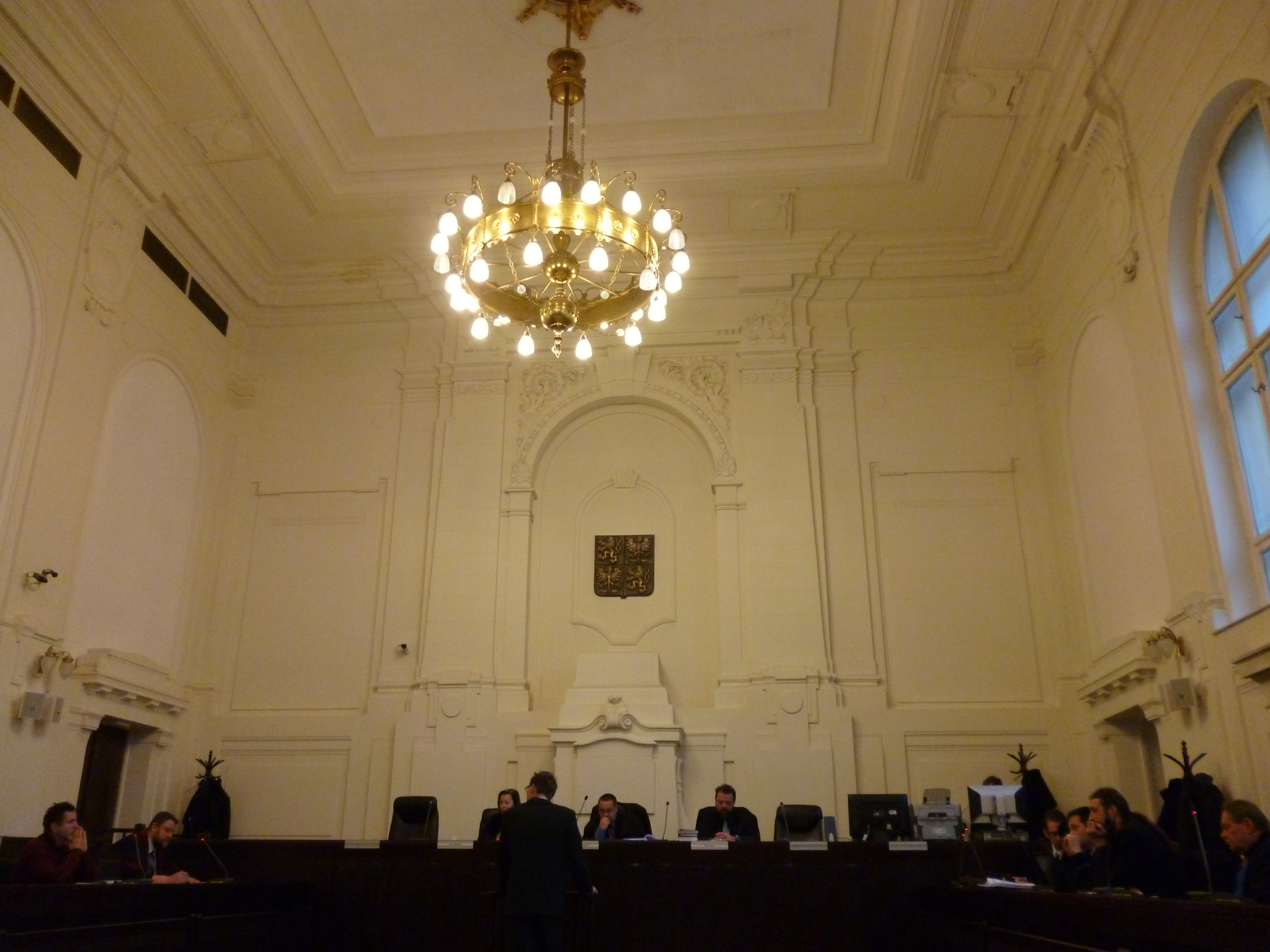
Courtroom 101 of Municipal Court in Prague

Altogether, eight witnesses delivered their testimonies on February 5, 2013. Among them were friends of Daniel Nosek. Nosek and three friends had come to attend the concert from Vrchlabí, a town in mountains some 130 kilometres (81 mi) northeast of Prague. They described Nosek as a huge fan of Lamb of God who had been able to secure an autograph from a guitar player before the concert had started.

Nosek's friend Jan Jebavý testified that Nosek climbed the stage, and as he turned around towards the crowd he was pushed by Blythe off the stage. He said he was "100% sure Blythe pushed Nosek with both hands." He further said that Blythe's behavior deviated from all the concerts he had attended in the past, commenting that Blythe was visibly furious. He further claimed that Nosek was not the first person to be chased off the stage by Blythe, with another fan being kicked, choked and receiving a punch from Blythe. Jebavý corroborated Blythe's testimony that Blythe asked "Are you okay?" after Nosek fell and that the crowd gave him a positive reply. However, as Nosek fell sick after the concert, they called him an ambulance. According to Jebavý, the band had not warned the fans against getting on stage and the security guards did not pay much attention to it.

Nosek's other friend Ondřej Vlach testified that Nosek's fall happened in a break between the end of concert and the encore. Nosek climbed the stage together with another fan as the band members were leaving to go backstage. According to him, Blythe ran into the two fans and pushed them both off. While the other fan was caught by a couple of fans remaining under the stage, Nosek fell directly on the ground. According to Vlach, there were fewer fans in front of the stage due to the break. Vlach further testified that after the fall, Nosek went to sit on a bench, where he was fetched a water bottle. Nosek began vomiting about half an hour after the fall and as his friends realized that he had a bulge at the back of his head, they called an ambulance for fear he might have a concussion. Vlach said that he understood Blythe's gesture in the break as an invitation to the stage.

Another person to testify was Robert Havelka, who worked as a security guard the night of the incident. Havelka said that the guardrail was too close to the stage, but not so close as to make a platform for climbing the stage. He testified that he pulled one person off the stage and that another person fell off before he could be secured. He further said that the fan's fall might have been helped by someone else, perhaps the singer, though he did not see it precisely.

Blythe's defense team attacked differences between the testimonies the witnesses gave after the incident in 2010 and at the court. Among other things, one of the witnesses originally alleged that Nosek and Blythe shook hands or that one of them offered hand to another on stage; however, at the court hearing, he testified that there was no prior contact between them. Blythe also argued that video evidence shown in court refuted claims about his aggressive behavior.

=== Day 3 of the trial ===
Milan Pořádek, the fan whom Blythe admitted to shoving off the stage, testified on the third day of the trial. Pořádek said he climbed the stage twice in order to stage dive; he changed his mind during the third attempt to get on stage. Pořádek testified that Blythe knocked him down, knelt on him and held him down for a moment, but Blythe definitely did not choke him. He also admitted that taking into account the fact that he (Pořádek) was drunk and the way he acted, Blythe's reaction was adequate. He commented that he grasped the fact that he was not wanted on stage.

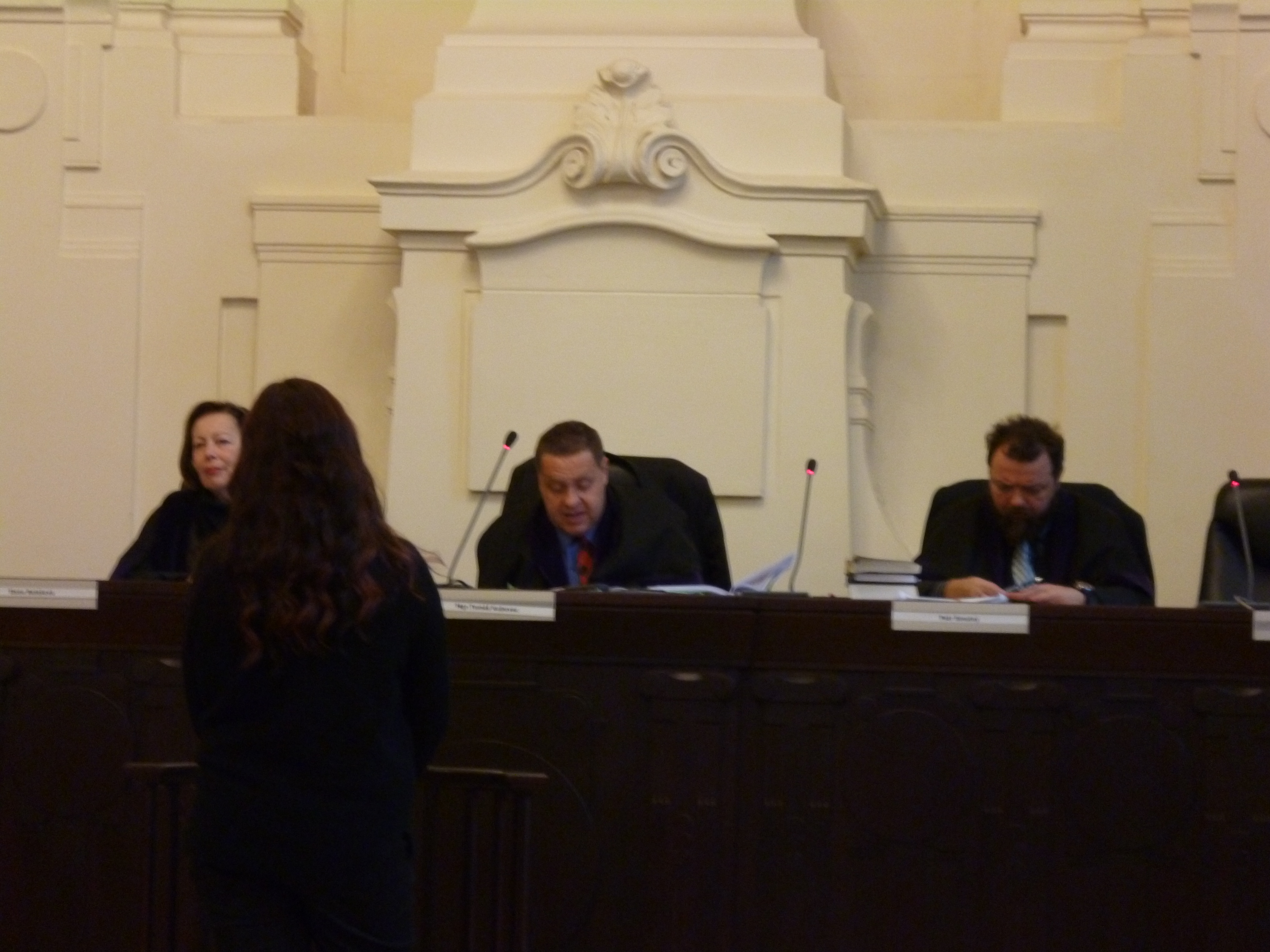
A witness testifying on 6 February 2013 in front of the panel of three judges (presiding judge Tomáš Kubovec in the middle)

Another witness who had attended the concert at the rear of the crowd testified that Blythe's behavior was standard to metal concerts, saying that metal bands always put on angry and tough acts and the concert at issue was no exception. She said that it was evident that Blythe did not want any fans on the stage. Neither the two nor any other witness who took the stand that day gave a testimony as to the moment of Nosek's fall at the end of the concert.

The judge also read a sworn statement from Abaton's former producer, who stated that she had not known about the incident. She was aware that an ambulance was called that evening, but learned about the reasons for that only later, during the police investigation. The court further heard that Lamb of God had sent a list of security demands to the concert venue, including that barriers should be placed 1.5 metres (4.9 ft) from the stage. Promoter Tomáš Fiala testified that although this was not the case, the band had not expressed any concerns to him either before or after the concert.

Randy Blythe was called again to the stand that day. The judge first alerted him that he had the right to remain silent and can deny answering his questions. The judge went again through Blythe's testimony and, with a view to the previous witness statements, asked Blythe whether he insists that it was Milan Pořádek whom Blythe threw off the stage. Blythe responded by saying: "To the best of my knowledge, it was Milan Pořádek who was coming up [on stage] every time."

Also that day, expert medical witness Michal Pogoši took the stand. According to The Prague Post, Pogoši testified that Nosek's cause of death was pneumonia resulting from a blow to the brainstem. Pogoši added that the "mortality rate from this kind of injury is around 40 percent, and that doctors couldn't have done more to save the patient." Nosek was initially taken to a nearby hospital less than a kilometer from the venue, where the initial diagnosis took place. Since this hospital did not have a specialized neurology department, Nosek was transferred to another hospital after the diagnosis. There, Nosek underwent two operations, first to tend to the injury and second to reduce pressure on brain by removing some bone.

Finally, defense asked for adjournment as a key witness fell ill. The court decided to continue with the hearings the next day, after which the hearings would be adjourned until March 4, 2013, in order to hear the defense's witness. Blythe committed to return when the trial resumed.

=== Day 4 of the trial ===
On February 7, 2013, only one witness took the stand before the hearing was adjourned. Lukáš Havlena contacted the defense after reading about the trial in newspapers because he "didn't like the description of the situation" by the previous witnesses. He said he did not think Blythe was aggressive that night, and that fans should realize any aggressive behavior displayed onstage is just part of the show. He also said that each time somebody got on the stage, Blythe demonstrated that they were not allowed there. Havlena testified that he saw how a fan tried to reach the stage three times and that as he was preparing to stage dive, somebody aided his fall from behind. He had not seen anybody fall directly on the ground. Havlena had trouble recalling details from the show, as he had visited multiple concerts on other dates in Abaton, and thus could not describe, among other things, the position of the guardrail.

=== Day 5 of the trial ===
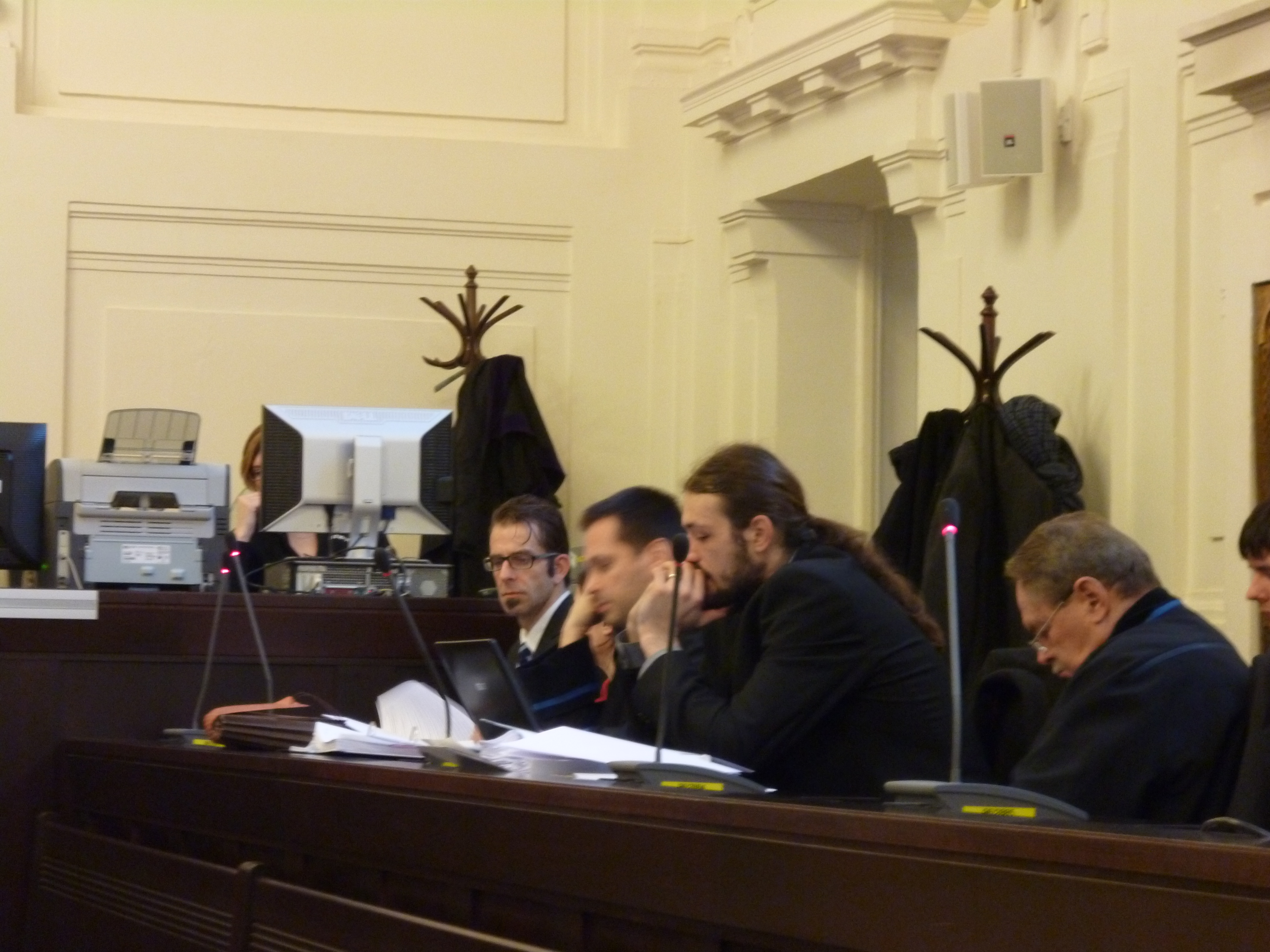
Randy Blythe with his defense team

The trial resumed on March 4, 2013 with testimonies from expert witnesses in the fields of criminal psychology (Tereza Soukupová, appointed by the court) and psychiatry (Alena Gayová, appointed by the defense). Blythe returned to attend the hearings in person, even though the presiding judge had told him that at this point they may be undertaken in his absence. The two expert witnesses agreed that Blythe is not aggressive; nevertheless, he may have issues with controlling his emotions under stress. The court further heard testimonies from two eyewitnesses. One of them was a bodyguard who was present at the concert but did not see the fall. He testified that when by the exit, he saw two men taking a third man out of the building to fresh air. He said that he was told by them that the person fell off the stage. The ambulance arrived 5–10 minutes later.

Another eyewitness was a fan, Alena Rozsívalová, who testified that she saw Blythe shove Nosek, saying "[h]e climbed onto the stage, and when he tried to stand up, Blythe shoved him." According to her, the shove was strong enough for Nosek to fall behind the front row of the fans into a place where no fans were staying at the moment. She testified that Nosek fell backwards. Another attendee of the concert who took the stand that day did not recall seeing any fall by the end of the concert.

=== Day 6 of the trial ===
A defense-appointed expert witness in the field of biomechanics testified on March 5 that Nosek could not turn 180 degrees during the fall and that should he be falling forward, he could not have sustained an injury to the back of his head. He further said that if Nosek fell over the first row of the fans, he must have been not only pushed, but must have jumped himself. The State Attorney immediately attacked this testimony, claiming that the expert witness omitted the conditions at the place and time, as well as some of the eyewitness testimonies, according to which Nosek fell onto his back from the beginning and did not turn during the fall. The presiding judge agreed with the State Attorney on some of his points.

In his closing speech, the State Attorney asked the court to incarcerate Blythe for 5 years, claiming that "even children in the kindergarten are aware that a fall from height may lead to an injury."

A Nosek family representative said that based on the witness testimonies, the family did not believe that Blythe was solely responsible. He continued that he would not be substantiating the requested amount, as no money could replace the loss the family has suffered. He further added that Daniel had died on his father's birthday, and his mother has consequently become a psychiatry patient unable to work.

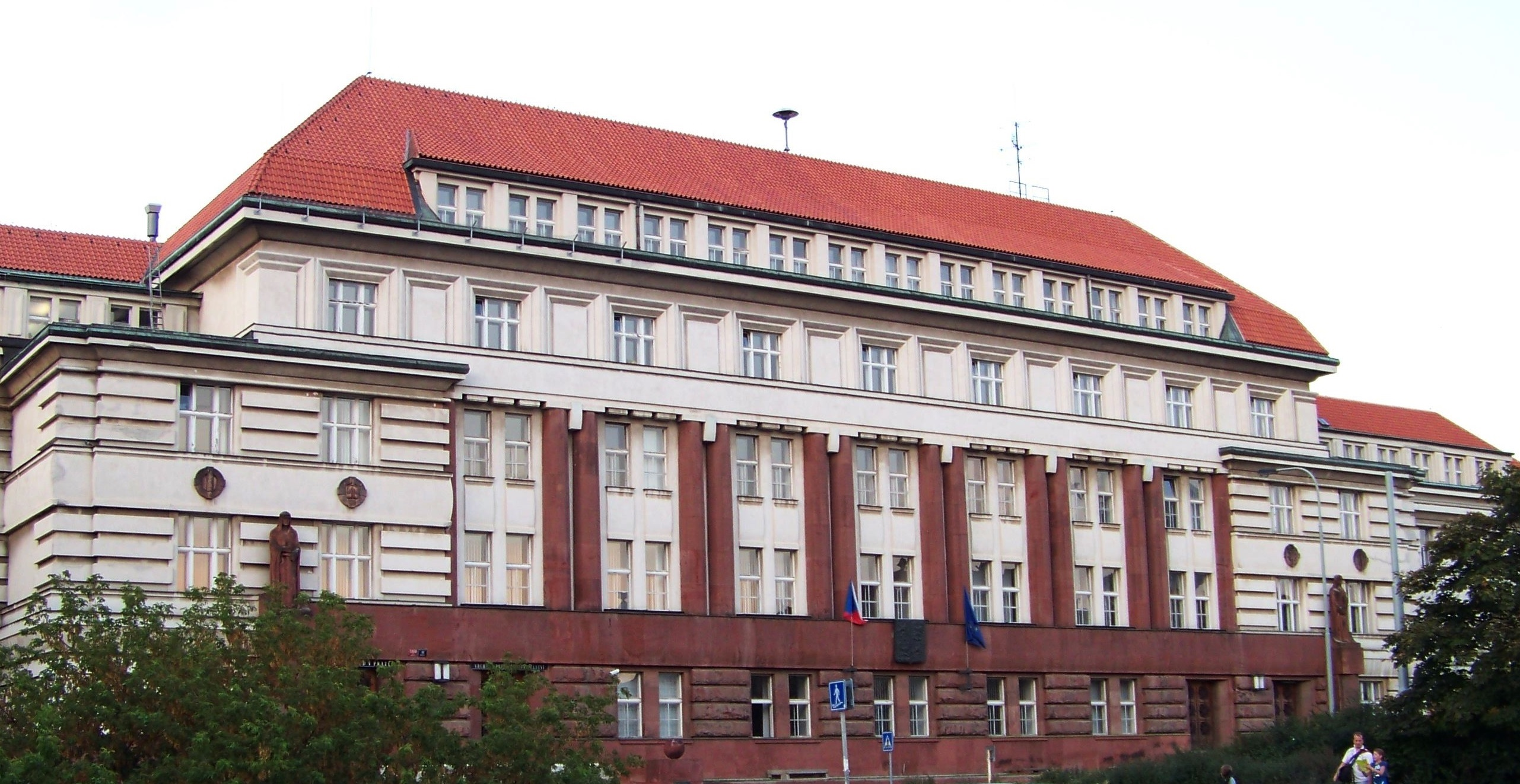
High Court in Prague upheld Blythe's acquittal. The court building is connected to Pankrác Prison, where Blythe had spent 5 weeks on remand, by a tunnel.

In his closing word, Blythe said that he did not wish to avoid any responsibility and that if he felt guilty he would have pleaded so. He further commented that in case of acquittal, measures would be undertaken to avoid anything similar from happening at Lamb of God concerts again.

=== First instance verdict ===
On March 5, 2013, the court delivered a verdict, according to which Blythe was not criminally liable for Nosek's death, even though he had the moral responsibility for it. Consequently, the court dismissed the damages claim and ordered the return of Blythe's bail.

The court held that it was proven that Blythe had thrown Nosek off the stage. However, Blythe, due to his nearsightedness, could have mistaken Nosek for the other fan who had repeatedly gotten over the guardrail. According to the court, the largest part of the blame lies with the promoters and security members. Judge Kubovec further reproached Blythe for not having met with the Nosek family.

The State Attorney announced that he would appeal the verdict.

=== Appeals verdict ===
The State Attorney's appeal was heard by a panel of three judges of the Prague High Court, chaired by judge Jiří Lněnička. The hearing took place in Blythe's absence. Blythe's acquittal was upheld by the panel on June 5, 2013.

The verdict could have been appealed by the Supreme State Attorney (SSA) to the Supreme Court. As the appeal had not been lodged by SSA within two months of the delivery of written second instance verdict, it has now become final.

In 2015 Blythe demanded around 15 million CZK for damages but the Municipal Court for Prague 2 dismissed the suit.

== Reaction ==
I think it's terrible what happened — that the kid lost his life and his family lost him — but I believe [Randy] is innocent. That's what I believe.

— Blythe's spouse, Cindy Blythe, after visiting her husband
in Prague Pankrác Remand Prison on July 11, 2012.

In reaction to the arrest and detention, a fan created a petition at the official White House petition site. By the time Blythe was released on bail, it gathered over 27,500 signatures.

On July 7, 2012, there was a vigil organized in Lamb of God's hometown of Richmond, Virginia, by a friend of Blythe's. At the event, Gwar (who are also from Richmond) frontman Dave Brockie said: “I don’t think it was right for him to be arrested. I don’t think it was right for him to be locked up.... This stuff could have all been worked out diplomatically or legally before he got there.” In addition to Brockie, other notable figures in heavy metal, such as Tom Araya and David Draiman, have also come out in support of Blythe.

In a post to his blog, Blythe explained that he met the Nosek family in private after the trial, and promised them to be "a spokesperson for safer shows". He emphasized that the family never attacked him and "just wanted to know the truth of what had happened to their son". In 2020, in a Reddit AMA, he stated that he's ready to play in the Czech Republic again and he "was not mistreated there", but added any performances in the nation would depend on approval from the Nosek family.
