= Lamb of God (album) =

Studio album by Lamb of God
- Released: June 19, 2020
- Recorded: 2019
- Studios: Studio 606 (Northridge, California, United States); The Halo Studio (Westbrook, Maine, United States); Flagship Studios (Virginia Beach, Virginia, United States); In Your Ear Studios (Richmond, Virginia, United States)
- Genres: Groove metal; thrash metal
- Length: 44:42
- Labels: Epic; Nuclear Blast
- Producer: Josh Wilbur

Lamb of God chronology
VII: Sturm und Drang (2015)	Lamb of God (2020)	Omens (2022)

Lamb of God overall chronology
Legion: XX (2018)	Lamb of God (2020)	Omens (2022)

Singles from Lamb of God
- 1. "Checkmate" Released: February 5, 2020; 2. "Memento Mori" Released: March 17, 2020; 3. "New Colossal Hate" Released: April 23, 2020; 4. "Routes" Released: May 29, 2020; 5. "Ghost Shaped People" Released: February 19, 2021

Deluxe version cover
- Artwork used for the deluxe version cover

Lamb of God is the eighth studio album by American heavy metal band Lamb of God. The album was initially set for release on May 8, 2020, through Epic and Nuclear Blast, but was later pushed back to June 19 due to the COVID-19 pandemic. Lamb of God marks the first studio album of all-new material by the band since 2015's VII: Sturm und Drang, making it the longest gap between their albums, and the first to feature Art Cruz as the replacement for original drummer Chris Adler, who left the band in July 2019. Lamb of God was once again produced by longtime collaborator Josh Wilbur, who had worked with the band since 2006's Sacrament.

A three-disc deluxe edition with two bonus tracks, along with an additional CD and DVD featuring the band's live stream event from September 18, 2020, in which the band performed Lamb of God in its entirety plus four encore tracks, was released on March 26, 2021, through Nuclear Blast.

== Critical reception ==
Professional ratings
Aggregate scores
Source	Rating
AnyDecentMusic?	7.5/10
Metacritic	81/100
Review scores
Source	Rating
AllMusic	4/5 stars
Blabbermouth.net	8.5/10
Consequence of Sound	A
Exclaim!	7/10
Kerrang!	4/5
Louder Sound	4/5 stars
Metal Storm	6.0/10
NME	4/5 stars
The Rockpit	8/10
Rolling Stone	3/5 stars

Lamb of God received critical acclaim from music critics upon its release. At review aggregate Metacritic, the album has an average score of 81 out of 100 based on eight reviews, indicating "universal acclaim reviews". At AnyDecentMusic?, the album has an average score of 7.5 out of 10 based on six reviews.

James Christopher Monger from AllMusic awarded the album four out of five stars, describing the album "a tense, yet confident album for taut and uncomfortable times." Manus Hopkins from Exclaim! scored the album 7 out of 10, and said that while nothing in Lamb of God feels "groundbreaking" or "cutting-edge" like the band's previous albums, the album is still "essentially what fans should expect from the band at this point." James McMahon from NME also gave the album four out of five stars, calling the album "a record that's the most authentic version of the band Lamb of God want to be." He particularly singled out the song "Memento Mori", which "driven by Mark Morton's unforgiving guitar, flirts with the ethereal goth of the Sisters of Mercy."

Kory Grow from Rolling Stone gave the album three out of five stars, stating that the album contains "the sort of piledriving guitar riffs and Olympic-medal-worthy drumming the band has perfected over the last 20 years" which making it easy for the band's "less political fans" to "get in on the fun." He also praised Blythe's "open-minded" and "inclusive" lyrics that make listeners to "strain your ears to make sense of his screeds."

=== Accolades ===
Accolades for Lamb of God
Publication	Accolade	Rank
Consequence of Sound	Top 50 Albums of 2020	40
Loudwire	Top 70 Rock & Metal Albums of 2020	N/A
Metal Hammer	The 50 Best Metal Albums of 2020	17
Revolver	Top 25 Albums of 2020	14
Loudwire	The 35 Best Metal Songs of 2021 ("Ghost Shaped People")	28

== Commercial performance ==
Lamb of God debuted at No. 15 on the Billboard 200, selling 30,000 album-equivalent units in its first week of release, of which 27,000 were pure album sales. The album also debuted at No. 2 on both the Current Album Sales and Top Rock Albums charts, and No. 1 on the Hard Rock Albums charts.

== Track listing ==
All tracks are written by Lamb of God.

Lamb of God track listing
No.	Title	Length
1.	"Memento Mori"	5:48
2.	"Checkmate"	4:30
3.	"Gears"	3:55
4.	"Reality Bath"	4:32
5.	"New Colossal Hate"	4:30
6.	"Resurrection Man"	4:59
7.	"Poison Dream" (featuring Jamey Jasta)	4:57
8.	"Routes" (featuring Chuck Billy)	3:04
9.	"Bloodshot Eyes"	3:57
10.	"On the Hook"	4:30
Total length:		44:42

Deluxe edition bonus tracks
No.	Title	Length
11.	"Ghost Shaped People" (also in limited digipak boxset and Japanese edition)	4:05
12.	"Hyperthermic/Accelerate"	4:04
Total length:		52:51

Live in Richmond, VA - Deluxe edition bonus live CD/DVD
No.	Title	Length
1.	"Memento Mori" (live)	5:51
2.	"Checkmate" (live)	4:39
3.	"Gears" (live)	3:57
4.	"Reality Bath" (live)	4:48
5.	"New Colossal Hate" (live)	4:38
6.	"Resurrection Man" (live)	5:20
7.	"Poison Dream" (live)	4:55
8.	"Routes" (live)	2:56
9.	"Bloodshot Eyes" (live)	4:21
10.	"On the Hook" (live)	4:28
11.	"Contractor" (live)	4:00
12.	"Ruin" (live)	3:56
13.	"The Death of Us" (live)	4:11
14.	"512" (live)	5:19
Total length:		63:19

== Personnel ==
Credits are adapted from the album's liner notes.

=== Lamb of God ===
- Randy Blythe – vocals
- Mark Morton – guitar
- Willie Adler – guitar
- John Campbell – bass
- Art Cruz – drums

=== Additional musicians ===
- Jamey Jasta – guest vocals (on "Poison Dream")
- Chuck Billy – guest vocals (on "Routes")
- Samantha Wilbur – children voice (on "Memento Mori")
- Maxwell Wilbur – children voice (on "Memento Mori")

=== Production and design ===
- Josh Wilbur – production, engineering, mixing
- Kevin Billingslea – engineering
- Nick Rowe – engineering
- Oliver Roman – engineering (additional)
- Jerred Pollaci – engineering (additional)
- Evan Myaskovsky – engineering (additional)
- Kyle Hynes – engineering (additional)
- Matthew Erlichman – engineering (additional)
- Paul Bruski – engineering (additional)
- Ted Jensen – mastering
- K3n Adams – artwork, art direction
- Randy Blythe – photography
- Travis Shinn – photography (band)

== Charts ==
=== Weekly charts ===
Chart performance for Lamb of God
Chart (2020)	Peak position
Australian Albums (ARIA)	5
Austrian Albums (Ö3 Austria)	8
Belgian Albums (Ultratop Flanders)	23
Belgian Albums (Ultratop Wallonia)	15
Canadian Albums (Billboard)	11
Czech Albums (ČNS IFPI)	62
Dutch Albums (Album Top 100)	44
Finnish Albums (Suomen virallinen lista)	6
French Albums (SNEP)	117
German Albums (Offizielle Top 100)	7
Hungarian Albums (MAHASZ)	19
Italian Albums (FIMI)	96
Japanese Albums (Oricon)	39
Scottish Albums (Official Charts)	8
Swiss Albums (Schweizer Hitparade)	4
UK Albums (Official Charts)	16
UK Rock & Metal Albums (Official Charts)	1
US Billboard 200	15
US Top Hard Rock Albums (Billboard)	1
US Top Rock Albums (Billboard)	2

=== Year-end charts ===
Year-end chart performance for Lamb of God
Chart (2020)	Position
US Top Rock Albums (Billboard)	94
