= VII: Sturm und Drang =

Studio album by Lamb of God
- Released: July 24, 2015
- Studios: NRG Recording Studios, North Hollywood, Los Angeles; Suburban Soul Studios, Torrance, California
- Genres: Groove metal; thrash metal
- Length: 48:07
- Labels: Epic; Nuclear Blast
- Producer: Josh Wilbur

Lamb of God chronology
Resolution (2012)	VII: Sturm und Drang (2015)	Lamb of God (2020)

Lamb of God overall chronology
Resolution (2012)	VII: Sturm und Drang (2015)	Legion: XX (2018)

Singles from VII: Sturm und Drang
- 1. "Still Echoes" Released: May 18, 2015; 2. "512" Released: June 8, 2015; 3. "Overlord" Released: June 30, 2015; 4. "Erase This" Released: July 10, 2015; 5. "Embers" Released: July 17, 2015

VII: Sturm und Drang is the seventh studio album by American heavy metal band Lamb of God (the "VII" of the title ignores the album recorded under the name Burn the Priest with a slightly different line-up). The album was released on July 24, 2015, through Epic Records in North America and through Nuclear Blast outside North America. It is the final Lamb of God album of original material to feature longtime drummer Chris Adler, who left the band in 2019.

== Background ==
VII: Sturm und Drang is the first album after lead vocalist Randy Blythe's manslaughter case and a brief hiatus after finishing the Resolution touring cycle. Randy Blythe stated that people should not expect a prison record and that instead, he would "write about things that affect me very deeply", such as going to prison in a foreign country and being charged with manslaughter, as stated by Blythe.

The album's subtitle, literally translated as "Storm and Stress", indirectly refers to Blythe's experience. Blythe says he and Mark Morton were talking about how the record's theme relates to the psychology of humans reacting under extreme conditions, and they wanted a word that reflected such situations. Morton, whose mother is German, came across the term while researching German vocabulary, after which the band agreed to the title.

Blythe calls the album "the most cohesive record" the band has done in a long time, with Blythe writing "90 percent" of the lyrics as well as main songwriters Mark Morton and Willie Adler working in collaboration on all of the tracks instead of writing complete songs individually. Blythe also stated that due to these reasons, "The record is much, much stronger for it" and is less "schizophrenic" than previous albums.

There was a guillotine right down the hall from me, from when the Nazis had the prison. From 1943 to 1945 they executed almost 2,000 people by the guillotine, because it was cheaper than shooting and quicker than hanging... They call it the Pankrác 'Saw Room' or the 'Axe Room'. I sat there at night, and I'd think about all those dudes that got their heads chopped off – men and women – in that place not too far from me.

— Randy Blythe talking about the inspiration behind "Still Echoes".

== Inspiration for lyrics ==
"Still Echoes", VII's first single, draws inspiration from the history of Pankrác Prison, where Blythe was held on manslaughter charges. Reciting the first lyric from "Still Echoes", Blythe asserts that there was real inspiration for the lyrics even though the words "might read like graphic metal imagery". Blythe said that he sought out information about the prison's history from guards and fellow inmates while he was incarcerated.

Blythe wrote the lyrics to the song "512", the album's second single, in Pankrác Prison cell number 512, while he was contemplating how the experience was changing him. According to Blythe, most of his time was spent in a basement dungeon. He said the guards put him there so they could monitor him for depression. "They stick you in the worst, dimmest, darkest place in the prison," he says. "I couldn't even see the sun to tell what part of the day it was. It was just steadily lessening levels of gloom."

The third single, "Overlord", was released on June 30, 2015. Blythe said the song is about the dangers of self-obsession in our distressingly myopic and increasingly entitled 'me-now/now-me' culture. It is about how many people cannot seem to look past their own relatively small problems to see the bigger picture, and how everyday problems do not in any way shape or form constitute an emergency. Blythe commented: "Sometimes things just don't work out the way we want them to, [so] deal with it. People who only see their own problems eventually wind up alone because no one wants to hear their crap anymore. We all know someone like that, always whining and complaining about some inconsequential setback as if it were the apocalypse. This song is for those people."

A fourth single, "Erase This", was made available for streaming on July 10, 2015. Guitarist Mark Morton told Rolling Stone the song is about "negative people and how they can drag you down without you realizing it. It's about people you might be close to, but who are stuck in their own self-pity and that kind of energy can spread like a virus". "Most of us as humans have been on both the giving and receiving end of that kind of attitude, but the older I get, the more I try to focus on not allowing that type of vibe to enter my mindset." He also said, musically, "it's trademark Lamb of God riffing," and compared it to "Laid to Rest" from 2004's Ashes of the Wake.

On July 17, 2015, a week before the album's release, a fifth song entitled "Embers" was released. The song features a guest vocal appearance from Chino Moreno of Deftones. Randy Blythe says the lyrics deal with how loss affects interpersonal relationships in terms of a family dynamic, and if a family member dies, that can really twist things up. Blythe commented further, saying: "I used a sort of 'oceanic' vibe in the lyrics. I'm talking about I've been staring at her laying still for so long, and I'm talking about the ocean at that point. The ocean is a metaphor for life." Blythe also said when the song was written there were two different endings. The first one was "'Lamb of God-like" which is "boring" and "done it a million times", said Blythe. Guitarist Mark Morton wrote the second ending and when Blythe was down at the beach writing his book and listening to it he says he could hear Chino's vocals on it and is a huge Deftones fan.

"Footprints" is an ecological song according to Blythe. While he was living at the beach during the making of the album, for the summer, he remembered how much he hated tourist season. "There is no reason for tourists to behave like fucking animals and children. The locals are not your goddamn maids, and if you want the beach to be nice or the mountaintop to be nice or the town to remain picturesque, don't like throw trash everywhere, don't destroy beauty...So 'Footprints' is about [carbon] footprints."

"Anthropoid" is about Reinhard Heydrich who was the architect of the Final Solution during World War II. When the Nazis invaded Czechoslovakia, they sent Heydrich. Heydrich was brutal to the people of Prague and broke their spirits. Due to his brutal efficiency, Heydrich was nicknamed the Butcher of Prague, the Blond Beast, and the Hangman. Later, a group of Czechoslovakia-born, British-trained paratroopers carried out the only successful assassination attempt on a high-ranking Nazi official when they attacked Heydrich during Operation Anthropoid on May 27, 1942, who died a few days later from his injuries. Blythe considers them superior men, and wanted to honor them with a song. So the song is about them and killing the Butcher of Prague.

"Engage the Fear Machine" is about the media using scare tactics and controlling the masses through fear. Since the band was flying around a lot during that time Blythe says he remembers seeing all of the stories about Ebola and how insane he thought it was. Blythe says: "What ever happened to Ebola? How long ago was that? We were all going to die, you know? The news just takes everything to the next limit, and it keeps viewers glued to the TV and it brings in advertiser dollars."

"Delusion Pandemic" is about how the Internet is a useful tool, and one can use it to learn, but it has also created a creatively stifled environment. "I do not like mashup culture." Blythe says. "There is nothing original about it. It's a waste of my cerebral space. Everything's getting shittier and shittier and shittier. I mean, I'm not Ernest Hemingway or whatever, I'm not the new greatest photographer in the world, but at least I'm writing my own stuff and I'm doing my own thing. Internet memes? Why are you paying attention to this? Why is there some stupid picture that you put some stupid little things on that say something dumb? This is cerebral garbage. You are clogging your mind".

"Torches" was inspired by a Czech student named Jan Palach. In 1968 the Warsaw Pact invaded Czechoslovakia in an attempt to keep the Czech people under communist rule. Since the Nazis had already destroyed and brutalized Czechoslovakia during World War II, this student went to Wenceslas Square to the stairs of the National Museum during a busy time of the day and set himself on fire. He walked down the steps in protest and then died a few days later. He became a symbol of dissidence for the Czechs up until the end of the communist area. Blythe says he learned of the topic while awaiting his trial and had a lot of respect for him. It also made Blythe think about "what kind of mentality does a person have to be in to be so upset that you burn yourself alive? That's got to be an unpleasant way to go." The song was inspired by visiting Palach's grave. The song also features guest vocals by Greg Puciato of The Dillinger Escape Plan.

== Release and promotion ==
VII contains ten tracks and a limited first pressing features two bonus tracks. The album was also made available with exclusive bundles through the band's website.

The first single "Still Echoes" was made available for streaming on the band website, and was also available for download on May 18, 2015, through all digital retailers. The album's second single, "512", was made available for streaming on the band's official YouTube channel on June 8, 2015. The official music video for "512" premiered on June 12, 2015. The official music video for the album's third single, "Overlord", premiered on June 30, 2015, and was also made available through digital retailers. The album's fourth single "Erase This" was made available for streaming on July 10, 2015. The album's fifth single, "Embers", was released July 17, 2015, a week before the album's release, and features guest vocals from Chino Moreno of Deftones.

Upon release the album sold 47,000 copies in its first week in the US making it one of the highest selling metal albums of 2015. It debuted at number 3 on the Billboard 200, and went on to reach number one on the US Top Rock Albums, Top Rock & Alternative Albums, Top Hard Rock Albums and Indie Store sales. Internationally it became the band’s second album to reach number one on Canadian Albums chart and also reached number one on the UK Rock and Metal Chart.

Lamb of God performed both "512" and "Still Echoes" on Jimmy Kimmel Live! on August 27, 2015.

The band began touring in support of the album on the day of its release alongside Slipknot, Bullet for My Valentine and Motionless in White. The tour went throughout the US and went till September 5. The group then embarked on their own US headlining tour with support from Anthrax, Deafheaven and Power Trip in January and February 2016. Lamb of God then embarked on a North American tour in May and June of that year with Clutch and Corrosion of Conformity serving as the supporting acts.

== Reception ==
Professional ratings
Aggregate scores
Source	Rating
Metacritic	73/100
Review scores
Source	Rating
AllMusic	4/5 stars
The A.V. Club	(C−)
Blabbermouth	9/10
Boston Globe	(Favorable)
Pitchfork Media	(7.8/10)
Slant Magazine	3/5 stars
The Guardian	4/5 stars
Rolling Stone	3/5 stars
Metal Hammer	4.5/5 stars
PopMatters	8/10

Upon the release, the album has received a score of 73 out of 100 on review aggregator site Metacritic based on 13 reviews, indicating "Generally favorable reviews". Blabbermouth's Ray Van Horn Jr gave a positive review of the album, citing "Still Echoes" and "Overlord", among other songs, for praise. Dom Lawson from The Guardian also gave the album a positive review stating "From the brooding dynamics of Overlord and Embers to the more expected savagery of Erase This and Delusion Pandemic, Lamb of God sound more focused than ever here, and thoroughly deserving of their status as one of metal’s biggest bands." Metal Hammer added "Behind the polished, muscular production of Josh Wilbur, Sturm Und Drang delivers LOG’s finest outing in a decade – a filler-free showcase of anthemic choruses, bludgeoning grooves and some of the best damned riffs the band have ever written, squarely establishing that tension is indeed essential to all great art."

The album was included at number 20 on Rock Sound's top 50 releases of 2015 list, while MetalSucks voted it the best metal album of 2015. Rolling Stone also put the album at Number 16 on their list of the top 20 metal albums of 2015. It was honored with a 2015 Metal Storm Award for Best Thrash Metal Album.

The album's second single "512" was nominated for a Grammy Award in 2016 for Best Metal Performance however it lost to "Cirice" by Ghost.

== Track listing ==
All tracks are written by Lamb of God

VII: Sturm und Drang track listing
No.	Title	Length
1.	"Still Echoes"	4:22
2.	"Erase This"	5:08
3.	"512"	4:44
4.	"Embers" (featuring Chino Moreno)	4:56
5.	"Footprints"	4:24
6.	"Overlord"	6:28
7.	"Anthropoid"	3:38
8.	"Engage the Fear Machine"	4:48
9.	"Delusion Pandemic"	4:22
10.	"Torches" (featuring Greg Puciato)	5:17
Total length:		48:07

Limited digipak edition & F.Y.E. exclusive edition bonus tracks
No.	Title	Length
11.	"Wine & Piss"	3:33
12.	"Nightmare Seeker (The Little Red House)"	4:56
Total length:		56:36

Japanese edition bonus tracks
No.	Title	Length
11.	"Wine & Piss"	3:33
12.	"Nightmare Seeker (The Little Red House)"	4:56
13.	"Ruin" (Live at Rock am Ring 2015)	4:16
14.	"Still Echoes" (Live at Rock am Ring 2015)	4:34
Total length:		65:26

F.Y.E. exclusive edition bonus CD
No.	Title	Length
1.	"Still Echoes" (instrumental)	4:22
2.	"Erase This" (instrumental)	5:08
3.	"512" (instrumental)	4:44
4.	"Embers" (instrumental)	4:56
5.	"Footprints" (instrumental)	4:24
6.	"Overlord" (instrumental)	6:28
7.	"Anthropoid" (instrumental)	3:38
8.	"Engage the Fear Machine" (instrumental)	4:48
9.	"Delusion Pandemic" (instrumental)	4:22
10.	"Torches" (instrumental)	5:17
11.	"Wine & Piss" (instrumental)	3:33
12.	"Nightmare Seeker (The Little Red House)" (instrumental)	4:56
Total length:		56:36

== Credits ==
As taken from album liner notes

Lamb of God

- Randy Blythe – vocals
- Mark Morton – guitar
- Willie Adler – guitar
- John Campbell – bass
- Chris Adler – drums

Guest musicians

- Chino Moreno – vocals on "Embers"
- Greg Puciato – vocals on "Torches"

Production

- Josh Wilbur – producer, engineering, mixing
- Nick Rowe – engineering
- Kyle McAulay – engineering
- Brad Blackwood – mastering

Studios

- NRG Recording Studios, North Hollywood, California
- Suburban Soul Studios, Torrance, California
- Euphonic Masters, Memphis, Tennessee

== Charts ==
=== Weekly charts ===
Chart (2015)	Peak position
Australian Albums (ARIA)	2
Austrian Albums (Ö3 Austria)	12
Belgian Albums (Ultratop Flanders)	25
Belgian Albums (Ultratop Wallonia)	18
Canadian Albums (Billboard)	1
Danish Albums (Hitlisten)	21
Dutch Albums (Album Top 100)	13
Finnish Albums (Suomen virallinen lista)	3
French Albums (SNEP)	55
German Albums (Offizielle Top 100)	12
Hungarian Albums (MAHASZ)	32
Irish Albums (IRMA)	25
Italian Albums (FIMI)	84
Japanese Albums (Oricon)	69
New Zealand Albums (RMNZ)	11
Scottish Albums (Official Charts)	6
Swedish Albums (Sverigetopplistan)	19
Swiss Albums (Schweizer Hitparade)	5
UK Albums (Official Charts)	7
UK Rock & Metal Albums (Official Charts)	1
US Billboard 200	3
US Top Rock Albums (Billboard)	1
US Top Hard Rock Albums (Billboard)	1

=== Year-end charts ===
Chart (2015)	Position
US Top Rock Albums (Billboard)	55
