= Lamb of God (band) =

American heavy metal band

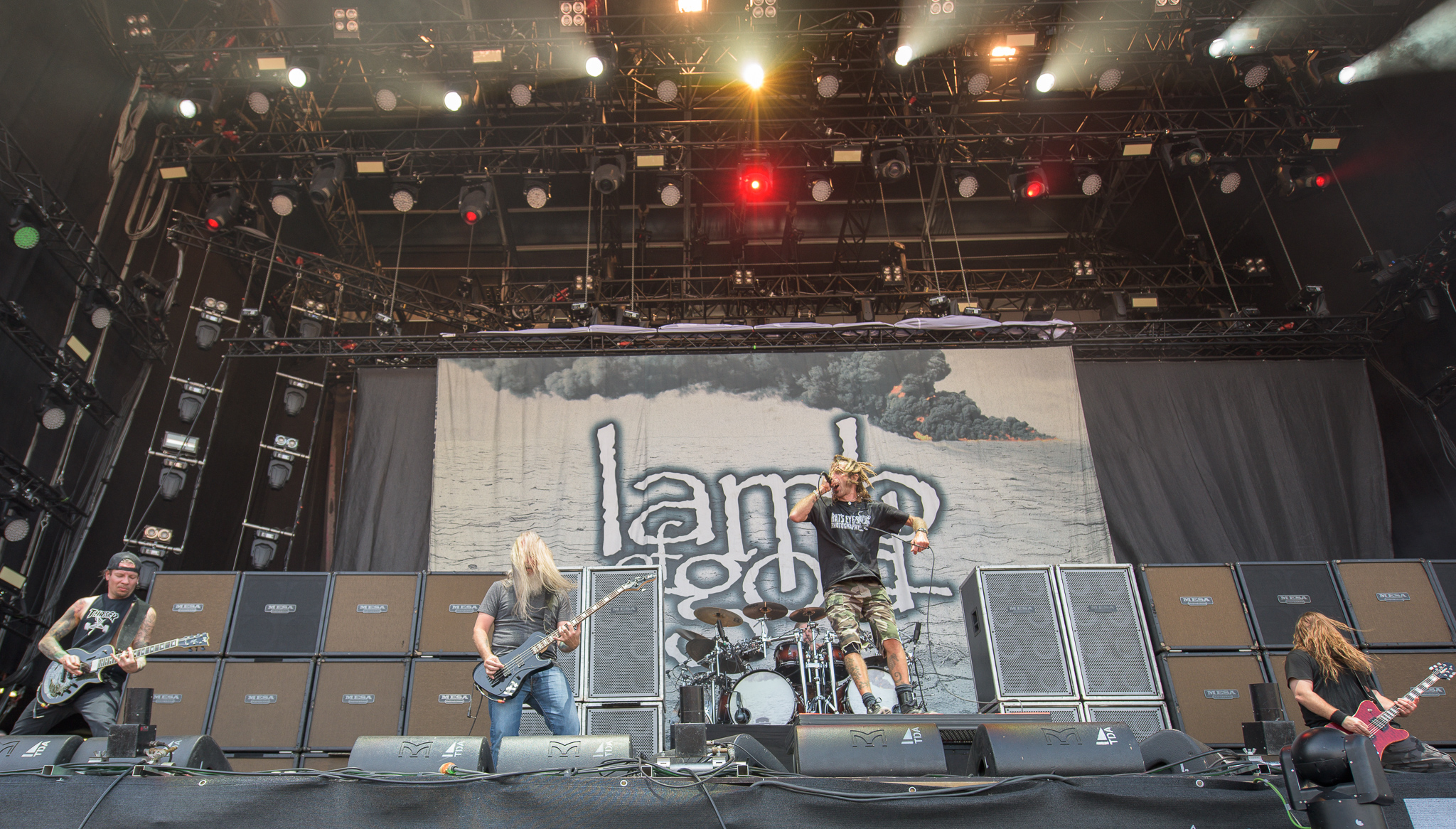
- Lamb of God performing in 2015

Background information
- Also known as: Burn the Priest (1994–1999, 2018)
- Origin: Richmond, Virginia, U.S.
- Genres: Groove metal; metalcore; thrash metal; death metal (early)
- Works: Lamb of God discography
- Years active: 1994–present
- Labels: Legion; Prosthetic; Black Market Activities; Epic; Roadrunner; Nuclear Blast; Century Media
- Members: John Campbell; Randy Blythe; Mark Morton; Willie Adler; Art Cruz
- Past members: Matt Conner; Abe Spear; Chris Adler
- Website: lamb-of-god.com

Lamb of God is an American heavy metal band from Richmond, Virginia. Formed in 1994 as Burn the Priest, the group consists of bassist John Campbell, vocalist Randy Blythe, guitarists Mark Morton and Willie Adler, and drummer Art Cruz. The band is considered a significant member of the new wave of American heavy metal movement.

Since their formation, Lamb of God has released twelve studio albums, including two under the name Burn the Priest; their most recent album, Into Oblivion, was released in March 2026. The band has also released one live album, one compilation album, three DVDs, two EPs, and twenty-eight singles.

The band's cumulative sales equal almost two million in the United States, including two albums certified Gold by the RIAA. In 2010 and 2011 the band received Grammy nominations for songs from their 2009 album Wrath. They also received a nomination in 2016 for their song "512". Lamb of God has toured with the Ozzfest twice. Other appearances include Download Festival and Sonisphere Festival in the UK, Soundwave Festival, Mayhem Festival 2010 and Gigantour. From 2008 to 2010 they toured as part of Metallica's World Magnetic Tour, and supported Slayer on their final world tour in 2018 and 2019.

In 2016, the staff of Loudwire named them the 39th-best metal band of all time. They are considered one of the "Big Four of 2000s metal", along with Slipknot, Avenged Sevenfold and System of a Down.

== History ==
=== Formation and Burn the Priest (1994–1999) ===
In 1994, bassist John Campbell, drummer Chris Adler, and guitarists Mark Morton and Matt Conner started a band named Burn the Priest. The band members knew each other from the college they were all attending, Virginia Commonwealth University, in Richmond, Virginia. Morton and Conner left the band soon after its inception to pursue a master's degree and work on other bands respectively. Adler and Campbell replaced Morton with Abe Spear. For the next five years, the band practiced in Richmond and around Virginia. In 1995, the band released its self-titled first demo. After the demo, Burn the Priest recorded two split EPs with Agents of Satan and ZED respectively. After the band's first three demos, Burn the Priest added vocalist Randy Blythe to its line up.

In 1997, Morton returned to the band. Two years later, the band released its first full-length self-titled album, Burn the Priest, through Legion Records. Mikey Brosnan of Legion Records saved up $2,500 for the recording and then broke them in Philadelphia, Pennsylvania, through DIY shows. The album was produced by Today Is the Day guitarist and vocalist Steve Austin. Spear left the band, leaving an open position for a guitarist. Adler's younger brother Willie became the band's second guitarist a year later, and a deal with Prosthetic Records was signed. Contrary to rumour, the band did not change their name to Lamb of God after being banned from venues; these bans occurred afterwards. They changed their name because of the altered line-up and to avoid being mistaken for a satanic metal band.

=== New American Gospel and As the Palaces Burn (2000–2003) ===
With a new name and label, the band released its second album, New American Gospel, in September 2000. Patrick Kennedy of Allmusic compared the band to Pantera stating, "The essential signatures of post-Pantera metal are in abundance on Lamb of God's inaugural album. New American Gospel provides a mighty oak upon which gritty American metal's faith is maintained, effectively bridging the '90s' insistence upon drill-sergeant technicality and the old school's determined focus on riff construction." Chris Adler commented: "This is a classic record. We had all the elements come together to make one of the heaviest, yet contagious records of our career. It was difficult to contain us—we didn't even understand at the time what we had created."

Lamb of God toured for two years before releasing their third studio album, As the Palaces Burn, on May 6, 2003. Kirk Miller of Rolling Stone gave the album three out of five stars, writing that "unlike many of their overreaching, Slipknot-influenced contemporaries, Lamb of God deliver a meticulously crafted metal assault." The album was voted the number one album of 2003 by both Revolver Magazine and Metal Hammer. The band was part of the first Headbangers Ball tour, where they recorded a DVD including live performances and a documentary, titled Terror and Hubris. The DVD was a success, debuting at number 31 on the Billboard Top Music Videos chart.

=== Ashes of the Wake (2004–2005) ===
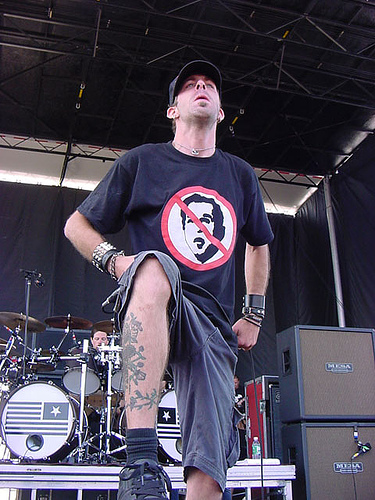
Randy Blythe during Ozzfest 2004

Lamb of God released Ashes of the Wake in August 2004. The album debuted at number 27 on the Billboard 200, and sold over 35,000 copies in its first week. The album was distributed through the band's new record label, Epic Records. Johnny Loftus of Allmusic praised the album, saying "With the genre getting clogged by PVC goofs and Alice in Chains impersonators, Lamb of God balances the equation of power, rage, tradition, and craft. It kills the filler." The title track of the album featured Testament guitarist Alex Skolnick and ex–Megadeth guitarist Chris Poland. Ashes of the Wake eventually became their first Recording Industry Association of America certified studio album, being awarded gold status in February 2016.

The band supported Ashes of the Wake with extensive touring, including a second stage slot on Ozzfest in 2004, and the 2005 Sounds of the Underground tour. The band was awarded 2nd Best Album of the Year by Revolver magazine behind Mastodon's Leviathan, and was awarded Best Music Video for "Laid to Rest" (2005). While on tour, the band recorded a performance and released it with the name of Killadelphia. The release was made available as a DVD and a CD. The DVD was certified platinum by the Recording Industry Association of America in 2007.

In 2006, a cover version of the first single from the album, "Laid to Rest", was featured as a playable track in Guitar Hero II. The original version was released for Guitar Hero Smash Hits in 2009. The original version is also available as downloadable content for Rock Band.

=== Sacrament (2005–2007) ===
In August 2006, Lamb of God released its fifth studio album Sacrament. The album debuted at number eight on the Billboard 200 and sold nearly 65,000 copies in its first week of sales, nearly doubling the first week sales of Ashes of the Wake. The album received generally positive reviews, with Cosmo Lee of Stylus Magazine stating, "Sacrament has the band's most memorable songs to date. Musically, there's no fat. The band plays with laser precision and songs move smoothly through riffs and transitions." Ed Thompson of IGN referred to Sacrament "one of the best metal albums of 2006", and Jon Pareles of Blender called it a "speed rush all the way through". Sacrament would become the band's second gold record issued by the RIAA in September 2019.

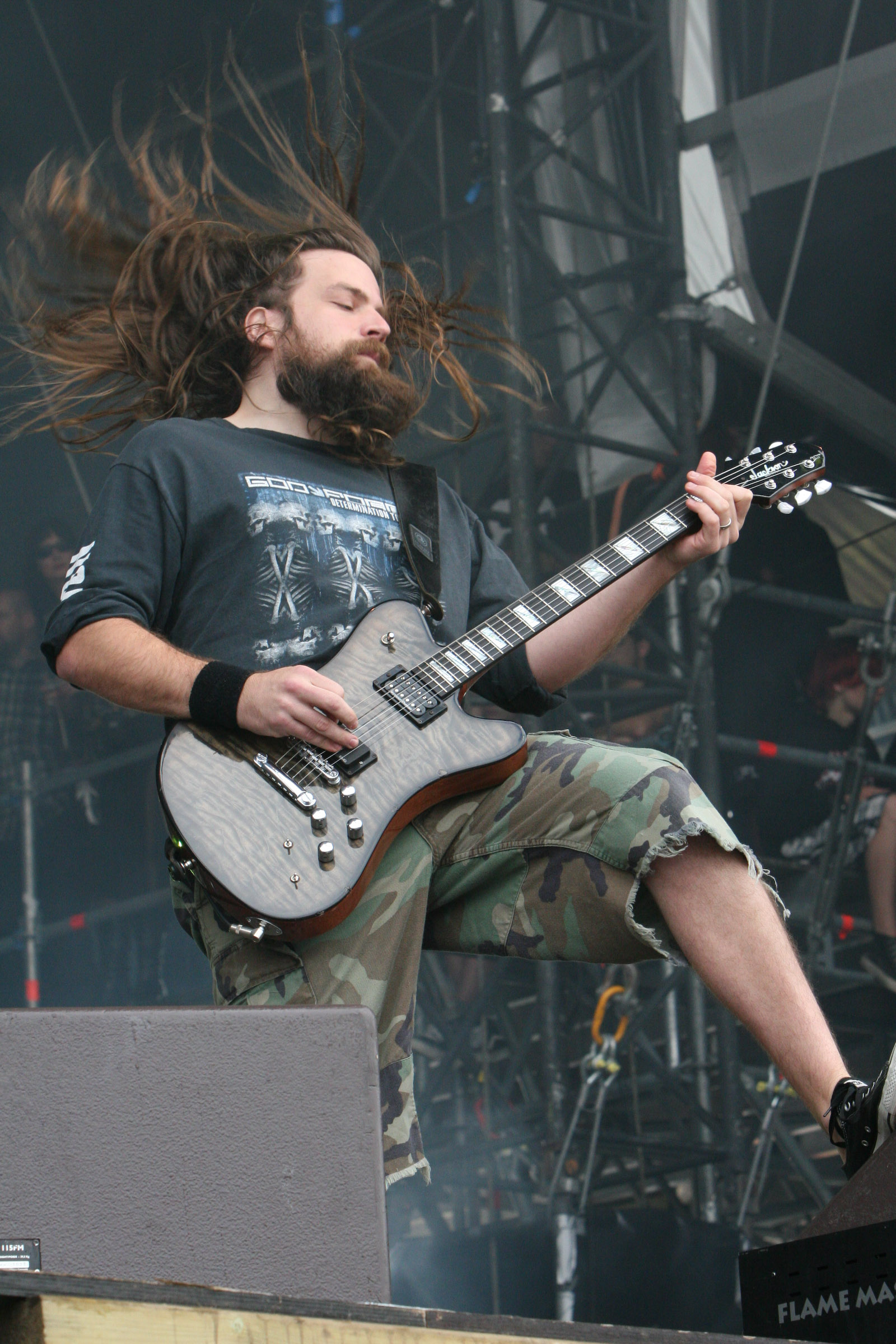
Mark Morton at Download Festival 2007

The band appeared on major tours to support the album, including The Unholy Alliance with Slayer, Mastodon, Children of Bodom, and Thine Eyes Bleed, Gigantour, supporting Megadeth; main stage at Ozzfest; an appearance at the Download Festival, and an exclusive co-headlining tour with Killswitch Engage, Soilwork, and DevilDriver, where Killswitch Engage and Lamb of God shared headlining spots alternately each show. Lamb of God was nominated for Best Metal Performance at the 2007 Grammy Awards for "Redneck", but lost out to Slayer's "Eyes of the Insane".

In December 2007, the band rereleased the album as Sacrament: Deluxe Producer Edition. The release contained all of the original songs from Sacrament on the first disc, and the second disc was a CD-ROM featuring all of the vocal, bass, guitar, and drum tracks in 192 kbit/s MP3 format, enabling the buyer to produce their own interpretation of the songs. Blythe stated, "you sometimes have to do something special to get kids to even buy an album these days rather than download it." The band took a break to write new material throughout 2008 and prepare a new record for release, slated for 2009. The band negotiated for a new record label to distribute records outside the United States. Chris Adler stated Epic Records in the United States "couldn't be more perfect", but wants a different label for international releases.

In spite of the success of the tour, the band was not without at least one serious altercation which has since been widely publicized. After playing a sell-out show in Glasgow, Scotland, members of the band and crew were involved in heavy drinking. After a brief amount of time, vocalist Randy Blythe, whilst wearing a kilt and attempting to speak with a Scottish accent, became verbally violent towards both drummer Chris Adler and guitarist Mark Morton, the latter of whom then struck Blythe from behind on the bus in response. The incident developed into grabbing, pushing and separating until Blythe and Morton then encountered each other outside on the footpath. The fight between the two was especially lackluster due to intoxication, but it resulted in Morton bringing Blythe down hard on the pavement beneath him, briefly incapacitating Blythe. Two days and at least one show later, the duo reconciled over drinks.

=== Wrath (2008–2009) ===
On May 2, Lamb of God announced via MySpace their new DVD, Walk with Me in Hell, would be released on July 1, 2008. The DVD is a double-disc and has nearly five hours of footage, containing the feature documentary Walk with Me in Hell and multiple live performance extras from the Sacrament World Tour. In August 2008, it was announced, by studio producer Cole Higley, that the band had commenced work on the follow-up to Sacrament, and that its release was scheduled for February 2009. Josh Wilbur was also named as the producer for the record. They also toured with Metallica as a direct support act starting in December 2008. The recording process of the new record was made available to view online live through the band's website, with two webcams installed in the studio (specifically in the drum room and mixing room).

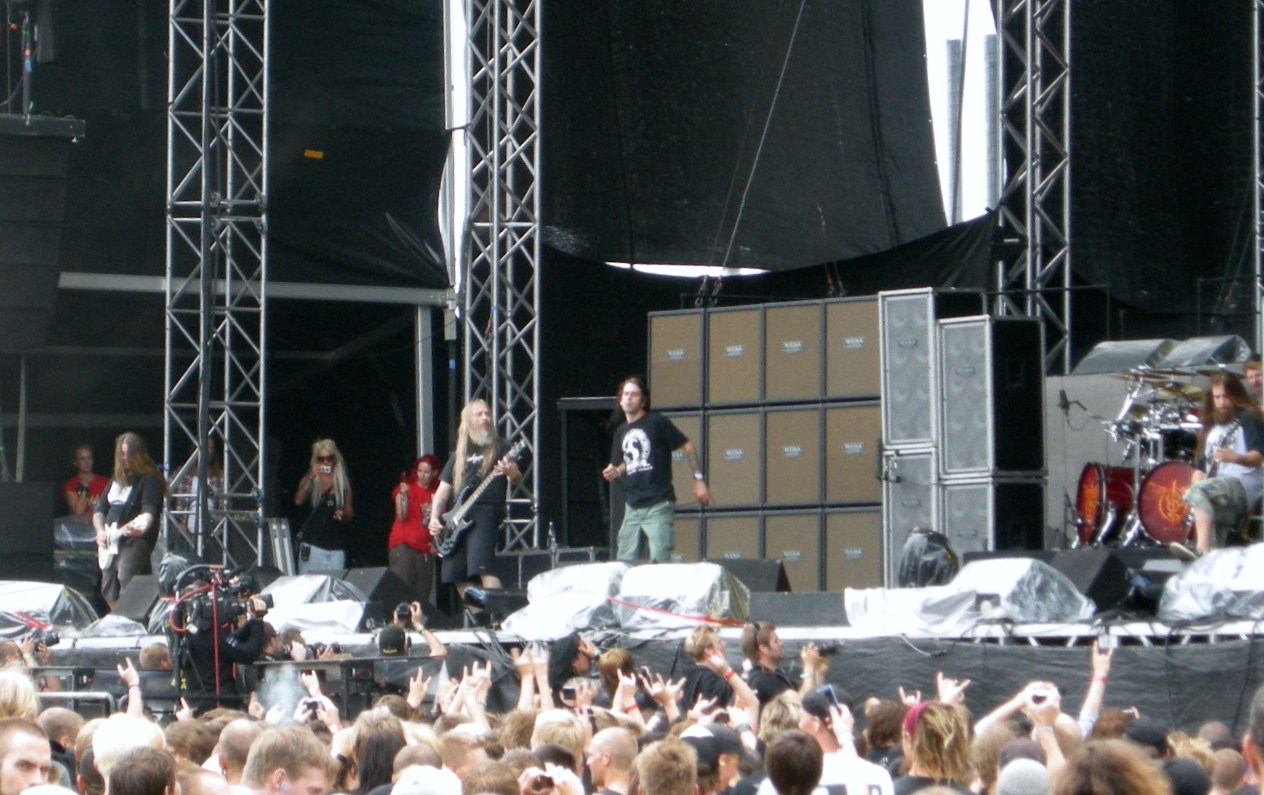
Lamb of God performing in 2009

On February 23, 2009, the band released their sixth studio album internationally via Roadrunner Records, titled Wrath and one day later in America via Epic Records. The album is dedicated to Mikey Bronsnan, who helped them get started in Philadelphia. In November 2008, Bronsnan was killed by a drunk driver. According to drummer Chris Adler, "Without Mikey, we'd very well might not be a band today." Drummer Chris Adler was quoted saying "This album is going to surprise a lot of people. Typically bands that get to where we are in our career begin to slack off, smell the roses and regurgitate. We chose a different path. No one wants to hear another band member hyping a new record. ‘Wrath’ needs no hype. We have topped ourselves and on February 24 you will feel it." "Wrath" debuted on the Billboard 200 at number two, selling over 68,000 copies in its first week.

In support of Wrath, the band in spring of 2009 embarked on the first leg of their world tour, No Fear Energy Tour headlined by themselves with main support from Children of Bodom and As I Lay Dying, and rotating opening slots with God Forbid and Municipal Waste. The band played in Europe in the summer to perform with Metallica on the World Magnetic Tour along with Mastodon, while also playing headlining shows of their own and performing at major European festivals. For the final six dates of the tour, Unearth's Buz McGrath filled in for Mark Morton, as he left early to be with his wife and his first child.

Lamb of God was announced to also serve as Metallica's direct support for the North American leg of their 2009 world tour, as well as finishing the year off by headlining shows in Australia and New Zealand with Shadows Fall and DevilDriver.

=== Resolution and Blythe's arrest (2010–2013) ===
Lamb of God performed for the first time in the Philippines for the annual PULP Summer Slam on April 17, 2010, with thrash metal band Testament and performed there again on February 18, 2012. The band also played in India for the first time on May 15, 2010, headlining the Summer Storm festival in Bangalore. They played for their Turkish fans at Kucukciftlik Park, Istanbul, on May 17. Lamb of God was featured on the 2010 Mayhem Festival, playing on the main stage alongside Korn, Rob Zombie, and Five Finger Death Punch. Paul Waggoner, guitarist for Between the Buried and Me, filled in for Lamb of God guitarist Mark Morton during the Mayhem Festival. In June 2010, the band played on the main stage at the Download Festival. It was their third appearance at Download Festival.

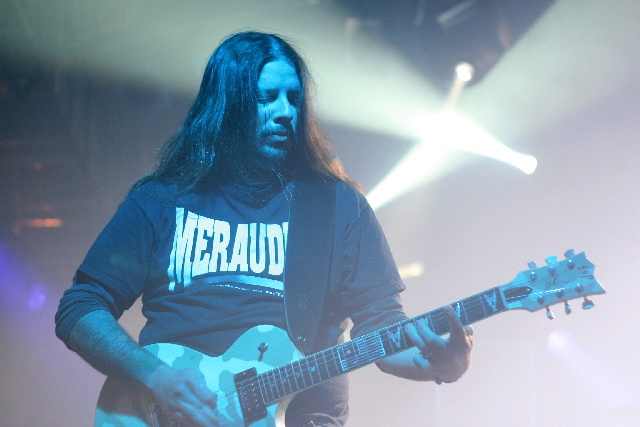
Willie Adler in 2010

On April 19, 2010, IGN released a 'making of' video that features Lamb of God working on their next single, "Hit the Wall". The single is featured in the Iron Man 2 video game. On February 15, 2011, Lamb of God announced that "Hit the Wall" would be available to buy via digital download. The band was also featured on the soundtrack for Namco Bandai Games' 2010 remake of Splatterhouse. Lamb of God was announced as one of the bands (the other being Baroness) to support Metallica on their Australian tour in late 2010. In a September 2010 interview, drummer Chris Adler mentioned that Lamb of God will enter the studio in February 2011 to begin work on a seventh album. In November, Chris also mentioned that the band will work with producer Josh Wilbur again.

Lamb of God was nominated for a Grammy in 2010 for Best Metal Performance, but lost out to Judas Priest's "Dissident Aggressor". The band was once again nominated in 2011, at the 53rd Grammy Awards, but lost, this time to Iron Maiden's "El Dorado".

On October 31, 2011, it was announced that the band is set to release their seventh studio album, Resolution, on January 24, 2012. The band also revealed the album's track list and cover art. On January 19, 2012, Lamb of God released a second music video for the single 'Ghost Walking', the first video being the lyric video. The video, which is completely animated, depicts a man fleeing from assassins in order to enter the abort codes for a large unidentified weapon. All the animation was completed by Moreframes Animation, and it was premiered on the music channel Vevo and YouTube.

In February 2012 Lamb of God played the Soundwave Festival in Australia and the Download Festival on the main stage in June.

On June 27, 2012, the Czech police arrested Randy Blythe for his actions during a 2010 concert in Prague. Blythe was charged, in the Prague 8 district court, with committing intentional bodily harm after an incident in which 19-year-old fan Daniel Nosek climbed up onto the stage with him. Blythe pushed the teen who then hit his head on the floor when he fell and later died of the injury. Lamb of God canceled their upcoming tour but resumed touring 38 days later when Blythe was released on bail. Blythe was indicted on the charges in December 2012. According to a verdict delivered by the Municipal Court in Prague on March 5, 2013, Blythe had thrown Nosek off the stage and had moral responsibility for the fan's death but he was not criminally liable. The decision was appealed, and upheld by the Prague High Court in June 2013.

=== First hiatus, VII: Sturm und Drang, and The Duke EP (2014–2016) ===
Despite statements from band members that Lamb of God planned to enter the studio in 2014 to begin recording their eighth studio album, hoping to complete it by the end of the same year, Chris Adler said in an interview with The Virginian-Pilot that besides the large amount legal fees the band encountered from Randy Blythe's trial, the band's inactivity during the trial had eventually depleted the band's funds and thus were unable to fulfill those plans.

On January 26, 2014, Randy Blythe posted a picture and a statement on his Instagram saying he would be taking a long break from Lamb of God. The band, after the then-current album cycle would be on hiatus, except for some summer festival appearances. By September, however, Blythe revealed that he was planning to release a new Lamb of God record, which uses lyrics he had written while he was incarcerated along with his book, Dark Days: A Memoir in early 2015.

In February 2014, a documentary film featuring Lamb of God entitled As the Palaces Burn was released worldwide. The documentary, directed by Don Argott, began filming in 2012 and was set to focus on fans of the band, but drastically altered its scope following Blythe's arrest. The film was met with positive reviews by critics.

The band began teasing a new album, with the placeholder title Lamb of God VII via Instagram and Twitter in late April 2015. A website, lambofgodvii.com, initially comprising an empty black screen, went online in early May. The "VII" (the roman numeral for the number seven) refers to the album being the band's seventh, and does not take into account the first of their albums, released with a slightly different line-up as Burn the Priest. On May 15, 2015, it was announced that the title of the new album VII: Sturm und Drang, and would be released in July via Epic and Nuclear Blast Entertainment. The first song, "Still Echoes" was made available for streaming on LambofGodVII.com, and available for digital download on May 18. In June of the same year, the band released a video for the song "512".

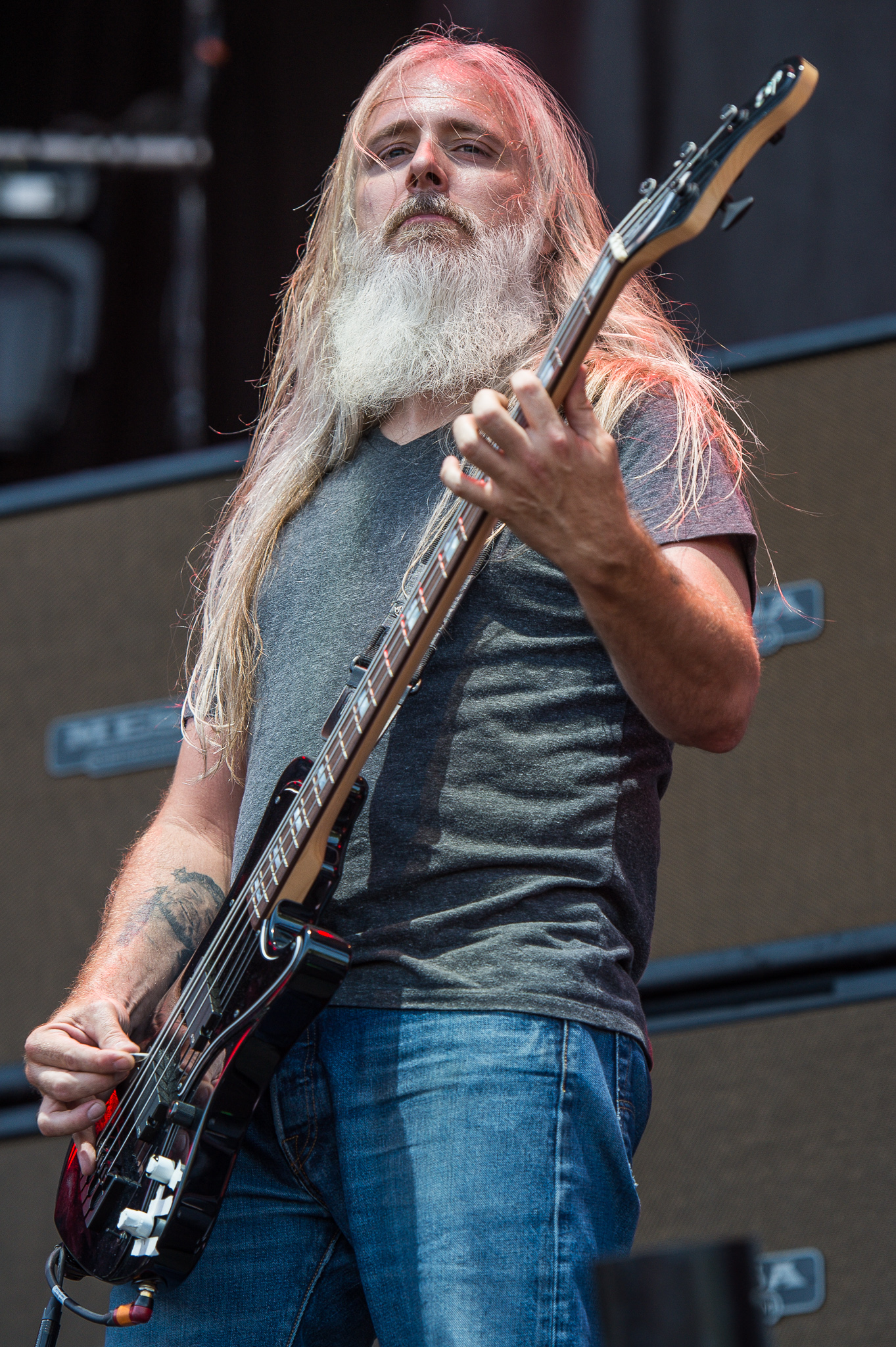
John Campbell at Rock im Park 2015

On November 14, 2016, Lamb of God released a new EP titled "The Duke", which featured two new songs from the VII: Sturm und Drang recordings and three live tracks. The title track is dedicated to a fan and friend of vocalist Randy Blythe, Wayne Ford, who died after a five-year battle with leukaemia. In addition to the new release, several members of the band auctioned off their instruments, signed CDs, lyric books and gold records to raise money for the Leukemia and Lymphoma Society.

=== Second Lamb of God hiatus and Burn the Priest cover album (2017–2018) ===
On April 4, 2017, Blythe said it was time for the band to "really go on hiatus" after their summer North American tour; this was in reference to the first hiatus being on the back of his release from prison and acquittal. On August 10, guitarist Mark Morton confirmed that the band would be going on hiatus but stated that they would still be making music but did not hint at whether this was either for an upcoming release or indeed for Lamb of God at all.

On January 22, 2018, Lamb of God was announced as one of the bands supporting the Slayer Farewell Tour. On March 22, Lamb of God announced that on May 18, 2018, they would release a cover album, Legion: XX under their original name Burn the Priest. It is the band's first album as Burn the Priest since their 1999 album.

On October 23, 2018, Lamb of God drummer Chris Adler was interviewed on the 486th Metal Injection Livecast and in the interview with Metal Injection he revealed that the band is aiming for a December 2019 release date for Lamb of God's tenth studio album. He also revealed in the interview that he had a conversation with fellow heavy metal drummer Lars Ulrich of the band Metallica about what it was like to work with ex-Metallica guitarist and current Megadeth lead vocalist and guitarist Dave Mustaine prior to working with him on Megadeth's 15th album, Dystopia, which was released in 2016.

=== Departure of Chris Adler, self-titled album, and Omens (2019–2023) ===
In 2017, Chris Adler was involved in a motorcycle accident that shattered his collarbone and right shoulder. While Adler had largely recovered to rejoin Lamb of God in time for its summer 2018 tour with Slayer, further complications from the injuries forced him to take a leave of absence from the band in July. Winds of Plague and former Prong drummer Art Cruz was brought in to replace Adler for the remainder of the tour. For several months, Adler's future with the band was uncertain, with Blythe stating in a June 2019 interview that "it's hard to see what's going to happen with [him]." On July 19, 2019, the band released a statement declaring that they parted ways with Adler, with Cruz becoming his permanent replacement. They additionally stated that they had begun pre-production on their forthcoming tenth album. On October 23, 2019, Adler released his own statement about his departure from Lamb of God revealing that he "did not make the decision to leave my life’s work" and he "is unwilling to paint by numbers".

On February 5, 2020, the band released "Checkmate" as the debut single from their self-titled album, Lamb of God, which marks the first song to feature Cruz. The album was initially planned to be released on May 8, but was postponed to June 19, 2020, due to the coronavirus pandemic. Lamb of God toured in support of the album, including a co-headlining US trek with Megadeth in the summer and fall of 2021.

In a September 2020 interview with Australia's Subculture Entertainment, Lamb of God guitarist Mark Morton was asked how he was spending his coronavirus downtime. He responded, "Writing and recording and creating new music is my favorite part out of all the things we get to do. There's a lot of elements, a lot of components about being in a band like Lamb of God. Performing and touring is one of them. Writing and recording is another one of them. The writing and recording part is far and away my favorite part of what we get to do. And so I have been doing some writing. I've been writing some stuff for Lamb of God, some stuff for other people, some stuff for my own solo project, so there's a lot of new music jumping out of me right now."

On February 4, 2021, the band released a song called "Ghost Shaped People" off the upcoming deluxe version of their 2020 self-titled album. The reissue of the album was released on March 26, 2021. On April 1, 2022, the band released a cover of Megadeth's "Wake Up Dead". The cover also features Megadeth. For select dates throughout 2022, Phil Demmel filled in for both Willie Adler on guitar and John Campbell on bass.

Lamb of God's ninth studio album, Omens, was released on October 7, 2022, nearly four months after the release of its lead single "Nevermore". The band supported the album by touring North America with Killswitch Engage and Europe with Kreator, Thy Art Is Murder and Gatecreeper throughout the fall and winter of 2022. They also opened for Pantera on the North American leg of their reunion tour during the summer of 2023.

=== Into Oblivion (2024–present) ===
When asked in a February 2024 interview with the RRBG podcast about the next Lamb of God album, bassist John Campbell said: "We're gonna put out some records on the same rough schedule that we always do. We put out a record, tour the shit out of it, take a little time back, start working on another one, record it, tour the shit out of it. So, yeah, there's definitely — we are still alive and kicking, and there will be more records. In the next five years, there will definitely be a new Lamb of God record. I don't think I'm giving away any secrets with that." In the summer of 2024, Lamb of God went on a co headlining tour with Mastodon with each band celebrating the 20th anniversary of an album: Ashes of the Wake and Leviathan respectively. Both albums were played in full at each concert. On September 12, 2024, the bands released a collaboration single "Floods of Triton".

On July 5, 2025, Lamb of God performed at Ozzy Osborne's charity farewell concert Back to the Beginning, the group then released a surprise cover of Black Sabbath's "Children of the Grave" as a tribute. The group then played a handful of headlining events in July and September. On October 2, 2025, the band signed with Century Media Records and released a new song "Sepsis". On November 21, 2025, Lamb of God released another new song "Parasocial Christ."

On December 20, 2025, a Christian holiday concert called "Behold the Lamb of God" was mistakenly labeled as one of the band's concerts by StubHub, due to similarities with the band's name. This resulted in fans of the band purchasing tickets and arriving at Spartanburg Memorial Auditorium in Spartanburg, South Carolina, believing they were actually going to see the band perform live at the venue. StubHub apologized and stated the company would issue refunds.

On January 15, 2026, it was announced that Lamb of God's upcoming twelfth studio album was titled Into Oblivion, and it will be released on March 13. The title track off the album, alongside its music video, was released on the same day. The band's previous two singles will also appear on the record. The album sold 26,000 copies in US in its first week and debuted at number 21 on the Billboard 200.

The band is scheduled to tour in 2026, including a North American headline tour from March 17 to April 26, with Kublai Khan TX, Fit For An Autopsy and Sanguisugabogg are serving as support. They will also be making an appearance at the 2026 Wacken Open Air music festival in Germany, and an appearance at Welcome to Rockville taking place in Daytona Beach, Florida in May 2026. They will also be making multiple festival and headlining appearances in Europe during the Summer.

== Headbangers boat ==
In the Fall of 2023, Lamb of God hosted the inaugural "Headbangers Boat" cruise. Aboard the Norwegian Pearl, the voyage took place from October 31 to November 4, 2023, traveling from Miami to Nassau in the Bahamas. The lineup featured numerous supporting acts such as Mastodon, Hatebreed and Gwar and Shadows Fall. Originally set to be a one-off event however due to high demand, the band held a second edition of the cruise took which took place a year later. It ran from October 28 to November 1, 2024, traveling from Miami to Puerto Plata in the Dominican Republic, once again featuring several other acts such as Poison the Well, At the Gates, and Exodus. The third iteration ran from October 31, to November 4, once again starting from Miami and traveling to Cozumel, Mexico, featuring acts such as Kublai Khan and Obituary. The fourth annual cruise is scheduled once again scheduled to take place in late October into early November ending in the Great Stirrup Cay, Bahamas.

== Musical style and influences ==
Lamb of God is considered a significant member of the New Wave of American Heavy Metal movement, having been referred to as one of "big four" bands of the movement, along with Killswitch Engage, Shadows Fall and Unearth. The band is mainly considered a groove metal band. Their music has also been described as metalcore, thrash metal, and death metal. Lamb of God's 2000 album New American Gospel has been described as "grindcore and death metal for the hardcore kids". The band's 2004 album Ashes of the Wake has been described "to showcase their thrash and melodic death metal influences and break out of the metalcore category critics tried to push the band into." The band incorporated more thrash metal elements in later albums, which was shown as a direction on Wrath (2009) and Resolution (2012). Burn the Priest has been called a fusion of thrash metal, death metal and hardcore punk. The Burn the Priest cover album, Legion: XX has been described as crossover thrash, hardcore punk, punk rock and sludge metal.

Randy Blythe's lyrics touch upon politics, war, existential questions and his own personal challenges—touring exhaustion, substance abuse and depression. He also leaves the lyrics up to interpretation once stating on their 2022 album Omens “I don’t really want to give the play-by-play on what each song is about because I think it robs each person of the experience of making that music their own.”

Lamb of God's influences include Pantera, the Accüsed, Septic Death, Drunk Injuns, the Faction, Black Sabbath, Obituary, Bolt Thrower, Corrosion of Conformity, Napalm Death, D.R.I., Machine Head, Shellac, At the Gates, Metallica, Testament, Slayer, Meshuggah, Megadeth, Aerosmith, and the Jesus Lizard. Although Lamb of God is a heavy metal band, the band's vocalist Randy Blythe is a more avid fan of punk rock than heavy metal and does not consider himself a "metalhead".

== Band members ==
Current members

- John Campbell – bass (1994–present)
- Randy Blythe – vocals (1995–present)
- Mark Morton – lead guitar (1994, 1997–present)
- Willie Adler – rhythm guitar (1999–present)
- Art Cruz – drums (2019–present)

Former members

- Matt Conner – rhythm guitar (1994)
- Abe Spear – lead guitar (1994–1997), rhythm guitar (1997–1999),
- Chris Adler – drums (1994–2019; hiatus 2018–2019)

Live musicians

- Doc Coyle – lead guitar (2009)
- Buz McGrath – lead guitar (2009)
- Matt DeVries – bass (2013)
- Paul Waggoner – lead guitar (2014)
- Phil Demmel – rhythm guitar, bass (2022)

== Discography ==
=== As Lamb of God ===
- New American Gospel (2000)
- As the Palaces Burn (2003)
- Ashes of the Wake (2004)
- Sacrament (2006)
- Wrath (2009)
- Resolution (2012)
- VII: Sturm und Drang (2015)
- Lamb of God (2020)
- Omens (2022)
- Into Oblivion (2026)

=== As Burn the Priest ===
- Burn the Priest (1999)
- Legion: XX (2018)
