= Order of the Shadow: Act 1 =

Order of the Shadow: Act I

Studio album by Psyclon Nine
- Released: November 12, 2013
- Genre: Industrial metal; industrial rock; black metal; aggrotech
- Length: 50:44
- Label: Metropolis Records

Psyclon Nine chronology
| We the Fallen (2009) | Order of the Shadow: Act I (2013) | Icon of the Adversary (2018) |

Order of the Shadow: Act I is the fifth studio album by the American band Psyclon Nine. It was officially released through Metropolis Records on November 12, 2013. Order of the Shadow: Act I is the third and final installment in the trilogy of albums that started with Crwn Thy Frnicatr and We the Fallen.

Nero Bellum worked closely with Chris Vrenna (formerly of Nine Inch Nails and Marilyn Manson) on the production of the album. It continued the industrial black metal fusion previously heard on We the Fallen, but was heavily influenced by industrial rock, notably Marilyn Manson's Antichrist Superstar and Nine Inch Nails's The Downward Spiral.

According to frontman Nero Bellum, it is supposedly Psyclon Nine's final album. In an interview Nero had this to say about the album: "The trilogy came to me in a dream. Let's put it this way, Order of the Shadow is the last Psyclon Nine record, although I may add installments to it, which is why I labeled it Act I. I always knew this would be the last record, so let's see what happens."

== Track listing ==
All tracks are written by Nero Bellum.

| No. | Title | Length |
|---|---|---|
| 1. | "(Act: I) Consecration" | 0:46 |
| 2. | "Shadows Unveiled" | 5:11 |
| 3. | "Suffer Well" (Backing vocals by Kristof Bathory, Jamison Boaz, Gary Zon) | 5:25 |
| 4. | "Glamour Through Debris" | 4:26 |
| 5. | "Come and See" | 1:36 |
| 6. | "Afferte Mihi Mortem" | 4:13 |
| 7. | "Use Once and Destroy" | 4:06 |
| 8. | "Remains of Eden: II" | 5:33 |
| 9. | "But, With a Whimper" | 1:29 |
| 10. | "Order of the Shadow (The Heretic Awakened)" | 6:11 |
| 11. | "Take My Hand While I Take My Life" | 4:51 |
| 12. | "(Act: I) Penance" | 1:22 |
| 13. | "The Saint and the Valentine" | 5:39 |

== Personnel ==
Psyclon Nine

- Nero Bellum – vocals
- Rotny Ford – guitars, keyboards
- Merritt Goodwin – bass
- Jon Siren – drums
- Glitch Nix – keyboards, samples

Production Team

- Chris Vrenna, Jamison Boaz, Nero Bellum
