= Mankind Is Obsolete =

American industrial rock band

- Also known as: MKIO
- Origin: Los Angeles, California, USA
- Genres: Alternative rock, industrial rock
- Years active: 2002–present
- Members: Natasha Cox (2002–); Jon Siren (2002–); Gordon Bash (2005–2007)(2008–); Scott Landes (2006–); Mark Nurre (2003–2007)(2021–)
- Past members: Jamie Roy (2003–2004); Nathan Trowbridge (2003–2005); Brian DiDomenico (2005–2008); Joe D'Ambra (2007–2008)
- Website: http://www.mkio.com/

Mankind Is Obsolete, (MKIO) is a female-fronted industrial rock band, based in Los Angeles, California.

== History ==
=== Formation and Metamorph (2001-2004) ===
By 2001, Jon Siren had joined Christopher Anton's synthpop band, Pseudocipher, while Natasha Cox and Gordon Bash were members of the group "Lotus Reign". Later, Siren and Cox met at the Musicians Institute in Los Angeles and recognized that they had similar tastes in music after seeing each other wearing the same Sisters of Mercy t-shirts. The two played in a jazz band together and in 2002 Cox also joined Pseudocipher.

By the fall of 2002, Cox and Siren had formed Mankind is Obsolete. With Cox on keyboards and Siren on drums, they began recording what would become their first EP, Metamorph, without a singer before Natasha stepped up to the role of lead vocalist. Some of the recording was done at the school's facilities, some in Siren's apartment using Pro Tools, and some in Cox's apartment bedroom. By February 2003, a live band had been assembled adding Jamie Roy on bass, Mark Nurre on guitars and Nathan Trowbridge on keyboards and running the light show. Additional recording and mixing was done by Steven Seibold of Hate Dept. and Pigface, and Metamorph was released in August 2003.

The songs of Metamorph range from "haunting" and "brooding" for much of the album to the faster-paced, more heavily electronic and more danceable 'Icarus'. The band toured throughout the west coast and southwest following this album and by late 2004, Roy had left the band.

=== Rise (2004-2006) ===
Cox and Siren began working on songs for their first full-length album in 2004 and in early 2005 brought in Bash as the new bassist. Bash also contributed to writing for that album and served as the producer for Rise, with the band recording it in his home studio. For that album, the band tried to capture more of their live feel by combining live acoustic instruments with electronic and programmed ones. The album has been reviewed as realizing a "mature and lucid vision", which Siren describes as being about "rising above a lot of the battles we were having in our daily lives. It is about seeing the negativity as it is and finding the power within to move past it."

Following the 2005 tours which included an East Coast foray to Goth Stock, Trowbridge left the band. Brian DiDomenico was brought on as the new keyboardist in late 2005, just in time to appear in the video for 'Still Right Here', released in February 2006. That year saw a full, nine-week, US/Canada tour supporting Rise. The tour was characterized by performances of such physical intensity that on one occasion Natasha threw out her back on stage and needed emergency room attention following the show. This incarnation of the band saw the creative load spread across the band with all band members contributing to writing new songs 'Awake' (composed for photographer J. Corsentino) and 'Picking at the Scab', both of which would eventually appear on Trapped Inside.

=== Trapped Inside (2006-2008) ===
In the fall of 2006, Scott Landes of Collide and Babalon joined the band as a second guitarist, initiating the band's brief, six-member incarnation. In the spring of 2007, MKIO lost Nurre and Bash as the band prepared to record their third album with Sylvia Massy and Jim Wood producing at RadioStar Studios in Weed, California. Landes had previously worked with Massy as part of Collide. He assumed Nurre's guitar duties and they searched for a new bassist for what was shaping up to be a darker album. Joe D'Ambra joined as the new bassist for the Trapped Inside sessions and tour. This album was to involve more extensive contributions from all the band members than previous outings. The album was recorded in July and August 2007 and released that September.

While some reviewers found the album to be their best work to date, with a very different sound than Rise, others found it entertaining and satisfying, but neither surprising nor progressing much beyond their previous efforts. A more typical reviewer found the album both a mature and experimental work that is "very rich" and "very organic", alternating between lush and hypnotic and aggressive and pounding.

After Trapped Inside 's September release, MKIO embarked on a year-long U.S. tour. While prospects of supporting the album with a tour that long contributed to Nurre's and Bash's decisions to leave the band, Bash was able to return in March 2008 when D'Ambra decided to leave. D'Ambra parted amicably after eight months with the band, including six months of heavy touring. A few months later, near the end of the tour, DiDomenico also parted ways with the band. As the tour wound down in August, they played the Warped Tour.

=== Outside endeavors ===
Following the Rise tours, band members have occasionally performed with other bands. DiDomenico and Siren formed the live band for Dismantled in its European appearances surrounding the 2007 Wave-Gotik-Treffen and Siren continues to drum for them live. Cox contributed to the Ikonoklast album The Dawn in 2007. After the Trapped Inside tour, Landes and Siren joined Kidneythieves as part of their live band. In 2009 Siren became the drummer of Psyclon Nine for the recording of We the Fallen and its associated tour. Siren occasionally drums for his former Pseudocipher bandmate, Christopher Anton's solo project, and also drums with System Syn. Bash is also part of the jazz band "Magnolia Memoir" as well as heads his own eponymous band. Bash, Cox, and Landes debuted the indie/alternative band "Alice" in early 2010. Following their tour with Android Lust in 2010, Landes began playing guitars with that band. As of 2011, Cox and Siren have appeared as part of the live band for Adam Moore's indie industrial band, Inure and Cox joined Siren for System Syn's appearance at the 2011 Kinetik Festival.

=== Möbius Loop (2010- ) ===
Work on songs for what would become Möbius Loop began soon after the tour supporting the remix album Manic Recession in the fall of 2010, with Siren and Landes starting with the instrumentals. Cox's work on lyrics and vocals followed and a version of "Crosshairs" made appearances in live performances in 2011. During the album's preproduction, in 2012, they also were named Virtual Music Ambassadors to Iran, and in June 2012 traveled without Siren to Algeria also under the aegis of a U.S. embassy program, for a ten-day workshop with Algerian bands culminating in a battle of the bands performance. By the end of the summer of 2012, the album appeared to be halfway done. 2013 saw some additional shows as tracks were laid down for much of the rest of the album. The album itself was released May 29, 2014 with additional production work and synth tracks by Christopher Jon of Android Lust.

== Discography ==
=== Albums ===
- Metamorph (EP) (2003)
- Rise (2005)
- Trapped Inside (2007)
- Möbius Loop (2014)

=== Remix albums ===
- Manic Recession (2010)

=== Compilation appearances ===
- Livid Looking Glass Compilation No. 1 (2005, Livid Looking Glass) - "She"
- Fxxk The Mainstream Vol. 1 Box Set (2007, Alfa Matrix) - "Still Right Here"
- Let There Be Life (2008, Live Laugh Love) - "In This Ocean"
- Pale Blue Dot (2011, Synthellec Music) - "Picking at the Scab (Live Mix by Sylvia Massy)"

=== Soundtrack appearances ===
- At Midnight (short)(2008) - "Angel Disease"
- The Virgin Murders (2008) - "She"
- Promise (2009) - "Prayer", "Troubled Dreams", "Fading"
- Super Undead Doctor Roach (short) (2009) - "She", "Lies"
- Amber Lake (2010)
- Ratline (2011) - "Angel Disease", "Passing Through"
- Paranoia (2012)
