= Jon Siren =

American musician

- Born: May 4, 1978 (age 48)
- Origin: Columbus, Ohio
- Genres: alternative; industrial; industrial metal; rock; electro-industrial; synthpop
- Occupations: Musician; songwriter; author
- Instruments: Drums, keyboards
- Years active: 1997–present

Jon Siren (born May 4, 1978) is an American musician and the co-founder and drummer of the band Mankind Is Obsolete. He has been a drummer or keyboardist in many other industrial bands, including Psyclon Nine, Dismantled, and System Syn. Since 2015, he has been mostly associated as the touring drummer for IAMX.

== Early life ==
Siren grew up in Columbus, Ohio and developed an early love of music in the time of MTV. His first performance instruments were guitar and bass before taking on the drums in his late teens.

== Early musical projects ==
When in Columbus, Siren played in local grindcore and punk bands such as Medium and Inept in his teens in the mid-to-late '90s.

While living in New York City in his early 20s, he met Kevorkian Death Cycle, who were interested in taking him on as their new drummer. A fan of their work, Siren moved out to Los Angeles, considering their offer, but by the time he had arrived, the band had broken up.

Once in Los Angeles, Siren attended the Musicians Institute. Columbus area collaborators Kristy Venrick of The Azoic and Steve Creighton of The Wake helped him establish California musical contacts. By 2001, Siren had joined Christopher Anton's synthpop band, Pseudocipher, and Evelyne Bennu's art-industrial band Flesh for Eve

== Formation of Mankind Is Obsolete ==
Siren met Natasha Cox at the Musicians Institute in Los Angeles and recognized that they had similar tastes in music after seeing each other wearing the same Sisters of Mercy T-shirts. The two played in a jazz band together and in 2002 Cox also joined Pseudocipher.

By the fall of 2002, Siren and Cox had formed Mankind is Obsolete. With Cox on keyboards and Siren on drums, they began recording what would become their first EP, Metamorph. Some of the recording was done at the school's facilities, some in Siren's apartment using ProTools, and some in Cox's apartment bedroom. By February 2003, a live band had been assembled adding Jamie Roy on bass, Mark Nurre on guitars and Nathan Trowbridge on keyboards and running the light show.

During this time period, beginning around 2002, Siren had also been part of Steven Seibold's Hate Dept., primarily as a keyboardist, and was involved in Hate Dept.'s 2003 album Ditch. Seibold performed additional recording and mixing duties on Metamorph, which was released in August 2003.

== Dismantled, Psyclon Nine, Kidneythieves and other musical projects ==
Siren's direct involvement with Hate Dept. wound down in 2004 as MKIO took off. For a while he continued to be involved in Chris Anton's projects including both Pseudocipher as well as 101, a Depeche Mode cover band.

By 2005, Siren had become a fan of Gary Zon's Dismantled and by the fall of 2006, he began occasionally filling in as the band's live drummer. This included a trip to 2007's Wave-Gotik-Treffen accompanied by fellow MKIO member Brian DiDomenico on keyboards

After Mankind Is Obsolete's Trapped Inside tour, Siren and fellow MKIO member Scott Landes joined Kidneythieves as part of their live band in mid to late 2008. That September Siren recorded drum tracks for Angel Bartolotta's Team Cybergeist project, which eventually appeared on 2009's How to Destroy Something Beautiful.

In the spring of 2009 Siren became the drummer of Psyclon Nine for the recording of We the Fallen and its associated tour. but following that tour, in 2010 P9 indefinitely disbanded. However, Clint Carney of Imperative Reaction, who toured with Psyclon Nine in 2009, brought Siren into his other band System Syn by 2010.

In 2009, Siren's involvement with Dismantled became a more regular event, appearing in extended tours, sometimes on the same bill as Psyclon Nine. By 2010, Zon was promising that in their upcoming album "Jon Siren, the Dismantled drummer is also going to be heard more on this album than before." In addition, Siren has occasionally served as touring drummer for one of Zon's other project's Aerodrone

In 2011, Siren and MKIO co-founder, Cox appeared as part of the live band for Adam Moore's indie industrial band, Inure. Later in 2011, Siren was involved with the Triptych Tour which featured Imperative Reaction, God Module and System Syn. On that tour Siren played keyboards/percussion for God Module and drums for System Syn. The tour also was part of the Goth Cruise which went to Puerto Rico, Bahamas and the US Virgin Islands.

In 2012, Siren toured with Dismantled in North America along with Accessory and Cyanide Regime. The tour featured Nero Bellum from Psyclon Nine on guitars. Following this tour, Siren switched to drums in God Module and embarked in a North American tour with God Module to support the Seance album. The rest of that year included tours with Psyclon Nine, Christopher Anton, Imperative Reaction and Ludovico Technique. Siren is now the guitar player for Imperative Reaction. In 2012, Siren also appeared in the Dawn Of Ashes music video for "Fuck Like You're In Hell" on the drums.

As of 2013, he has also drummed for September Mourning, Dawn of Ashes, and Early Man (band). In the fall of 2013 he embarked on "The Hellions Of Hollywood Tour" featuring Psyclon Nine and Dawn Of Ashes and drummed for both bands. He has been featured on drums in the video "Live Fast Die Loud" by Beasto Blanco featuring Chuck Garric of Alice Cooper. He has also been featured in the new Psyclon Nine video "Use Once and Destroy" on the drums as well as the new Dawn Of Ashes video "Poisoning The Steps Of Babel." Jon Siren finished off the year working on new albums with Early Man (band) and Mankind Is Obsolete.

In 2014, he filled in as a tour drummer for Information Society for two dates in May in Columbia, and for White Empress for several dates in October in the midwest. In 2014, Jon also recorded two releases with Early Man "Thank God You've Got the Answers for Us All" and "The Halloween ep."

In 2015, Siren filled in for more Information Society dates in the US during the Spring. He also recorded drums with Scott Carlson of "Repulsion" for "Morbid Tales" Celtic Frost tribute album under the name Coffin's Slave. The release included a cover of Hellhammer's "The Reaper" on a bonus flexi. In addition to that recording, he drummed on the upcoming album from Los Angeles doom/black metal band "Ancestral Awakening." Recently, Siren has been recruited to play drums for the upcoming IAMX tour supporting the new album Metanoia.

In 2017, Siren filled in on drums for a tour with industrial music pioneers Front Line Assembly. The tour also featured legendary industrial bands Revolting Cocks and Cubanate and was centered around LA's Coldwaves Festival at The Regent as well as the Wax Trax Documentary "Industrial Accident" premiere at the Montalban Theater in Hollywood, CA.

== Author ==
During the rest periods of the 1 1/2-year tour cycle with IAMX, Siren wrote his first book titled "The Touring Vegan" which contains information about his background as a long-term vegan who travels regularly. It explains Siren's views on animal issues, diet, lifestyle and includes tips on how to navigate in a world that is not set up conveniently for vegans. It was released in an e-book format in 2017 and there are plans for a physical release in 2018.

== Discography ==
=== Albums ===
- Images of Betrayal (Inept) (1998)
- Fragments of Empathy (Pseudocipher) (2003)
- DITCH (Hate Dept.), (2003)
- Metamorph (EP) (Mankind is Obsolete) (2003)
- Rise (Mankind is Obsolete)(2005)
- Trapped Inside (Mankind is Obsolete)(2007)
- How To Destroy Something Beautiful 'Crash and Burn' (Team Cybergeist) (2008)
- We the Fallen (Psyclon Nine) (2009)
- The War Inside Me (Dismantled) (2011)
- Order of the Shadow: Act I (Psyclon Nine) (2013)
- Möbius Loop (Mankind is Obsolete) (2014)
- Thank God You've Got the Answers for Us All (Early Man) (2014)
- The Halloween ep (Early Man) (2014)

=== Remix albums ===
- Manic Recession(Mankind is Obsolete)(2010)

=== Compilation appearances ===
- Livid Looking Glass Compilation No. 1 (2005, Livid Looking Glass) - Mankind is Obsolete "She"
- Fxxk The Mainstream Vol. 1 Box Set (2007, Alfa Matrix) - Mankind is Obsolete "Still Right Here"
- Let There Be Life (2008, Live Laugh Love) - Mankind is Obsolete "In This Ocean
- Morbid Tales 'A Tribute to Celtic Frost' (Coffin's Slave) (2015) "Dance Sleazy" plus bonus flexi 7" vinyl with cover of Hellhammer's "The Reaper."
