= Nothing Left =

Nothing Left may refer to:

- Nothing Left, a musical supergroup featuring current and former members of bands For Today, A Bullet for Pretty Boy, and Silent Planet
- "Nothing Left" (Kygo song), 2015 song by Kygo featuring Will Heard
- "Nothing Left", by Annihilator from their 1999 album Criteria for a Black Widow
- "Nothing Left", by As I Lay Dying from their 2007 album An Ocean Between Us
- "Nothing Left", by Asking Alexandria from their 2023 album Where Do We Go from Here?
- "Nothing Left", by Delain from their 2009 album April Rain
- "Nothing Left", by Norther from their 2002 album Dreams of Endless War
- "Nothing Left", by Psyclon Nine from their 2005 album INRI
- "Nothing Left", by Visions of Atlantis from their 2007 album Trinity
- "Nothing Left 1" and "Nothing Left 2," by Orbital from their 1999 album The Middle of Nowhere
