= INRI (disambiguation) =

INRI or I.N.R.I. represents the Latin inscription IESVS NAZARENVS REX IVDÆORVM (Iesus Nazarenus, Rex Iudaeorum), which in English translates to "Jesus the Nazarene, King of the Jews" (John 19:19).

INRI may also refer to:

- I.N.R.I. (film), a 1923 German silent film depicting the life of Christ
- INRI (Psyclon Nine album), 2005
- I.N.R.I. (Sarcófago album), 1987
- Inri Cristo (born 1948), Brazilian self-proclaimed incarnate of Jesus
- INRI studio, an independent production house from Singapore
- Iron Nails Ran In, interpretation by the protagonist of James Joyce's Ulysses
