= Davey Oberlin =

American musician

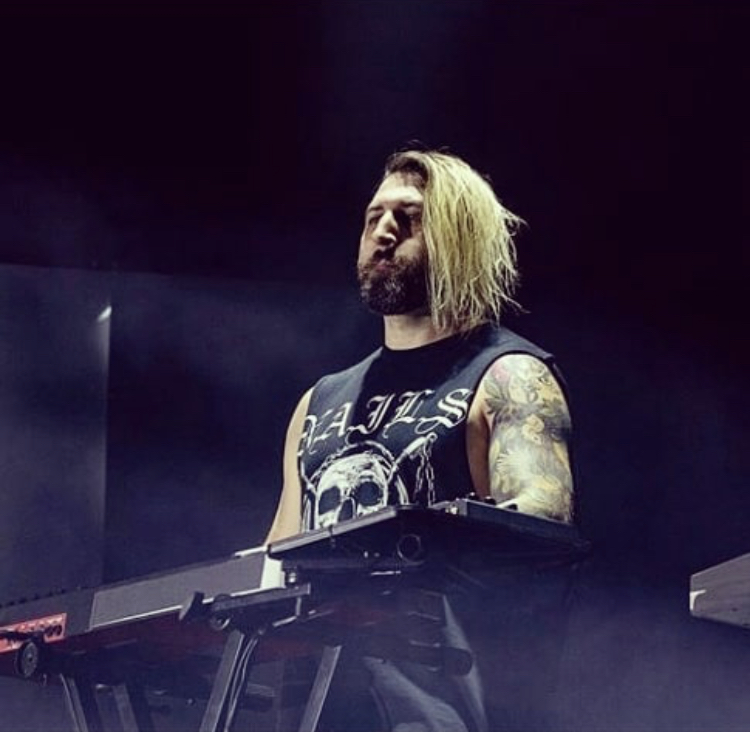

Background information
- Genres: Nu-metal, deathcore
- Occupation: Musician
- Instruments: Guitar, keyboards, vocals

Davey Oberlin is an American musician. He is best known as the touring keyboardist for Korn. Oberlin is also known for his work in heavy metal group Five Finger Death Punch and symphonic deathcore group Winds of Plague.

== Background ==
At sixteen, Oberlin drew animation in-betweens at Cartoon Network for animated television series The Powerpuff Girls. Between 2003 and 2009, Oberlin worked as a game tester at Activision, testing popular video game titles including Call of Duty, Call of Duty: World at War, Guitar Hero World Tour, X-Men Legends, 007: Quantum of Solace, and Spider-Man: Web of Shadows. Oberlin also provided the score and sound design for the mobile game hits GraveStompers and Avenged Sevenfold's Hail to the King: Deathbat, where Oberlin voiced a majority of the characters and produced several ambient themes.

== Musical career ==
=== Early career ===
Between 2003 and 2005, Oberlin joined rocker Jennifer Finch's band The Shocker touring Europe and the United States as lead guitar and second vocals. Following his exit from the band, Oberlin formed the Orange County, California based band Perish. With Perish, Oberlin released a record produced by Paul Miner of Death By Stereo fame. Several years later, Oberlin, along with Perish, released an album exclusively in Japan. The album included the song "The Hammer," which featured guest vocals from Dave Peters of Throwdown fame.

In 2009, Oberlin joined the extreme metal band Dawn of Ashes. Oberlin co-wrote the band's album Genocide Chapters for Metal Blade Records under the stage name Volkar Kael. The band toured as opening act for Dimmu Borgir across the United States and Canada.

Following his time with Dawn of Ashes, Oberlin joined the band Stolen Babies featuring Gil Sharone of Marilyn Manson/The Dillinger Escape Plan fame. Oberlin played drums and lead guitar for the band while touring with bands including Katatonia, Sevendust, and The Devin Townsend Project.

=== Winds of Plague ===
In 2015, Oberlin joined symphonic deathcore band Winds of Plague. Oberlin played guitar and performed on several tours with the band before being asked to join the band Korn.

=== Korn ===
While Oberlin was working as a guitar technician for heavy metal band Avenged Sevenfold, Oberlin met Jonathan Davis and his bandmates from Korn. When keyboardist Zac Baird left Korn after a ten-year stint with the band, guitarist Brian Welch recommended Oberlin to take over as keyboardist in the band. In 2017, Oberlin officially joined the live band as Baird's replacement.

=== All the Damn Vampires ===
In 2019, Oberlin created his solo synthwave project "All the Damn Vampires." On March 30, 2020, the video for his single "Saturday" was officially released.

=== Five Finger Death Punch ===
From 2022 to 2024, Oberlin sang second vocals and played keyboard for heavy metal band Five Finger Death Punch, including for the Metallica 72 stadium shows. Oberlin also took over lead vocals with Phil Labonte at SoFi Stadium after Ivan Moody contracted COVID-19.

== Artwork ==
In addition to his music career, Oberlin is an artist and enjoys painting. He created the pop art character line the "Boneheads" and has painted pieces for attorney Bobby Samini, Bobby Schubenski, and Grammy Award winning musician Zedd.

== See also ==
- Korn Members
- Winds of Plague Members
- Dawn of Ashes Members
