= Blood of My Enemy =

Studio album by Winds of Plague
- Released: October 27, 2017
- Genre: Deathcore; metalcore; symphonic metal
- Length: 39:10
- Label: eOne; Good Fight
- Producer: Joakim Karlsson; Noah Sebastian

Winds of Plague chronology
Resistance (2013)	Blood of My Enemy (2017)

Singles from Blood of My Enemy
- 1. "Never Alone" Released: September 22, 2017; 2. "Kings of Carnage" Released: October 9, 2017; 3. "From Failure, Comes Clarity" Released: October 23, 2017

Blood of My Enemy is the fifth studio album by American deathcore band Winds of Plague. The album was released on October 27, 2017 through Entertainment One Music and Good Fight Entertainment. It is the band's first album not to be released through Century Media Records.

== Background and promotion ==
A music video was released for the song "Never Alone" on September 22, 2017 via the band's official YouTube channel. The song was one of the first to be written for the album, with vocalist Johnny Plague referring to the song as a balancing point for the remaining songs, stating "It's not the heaviest song of the record and it isn't the most melodic song of the record."

Professional ratings
Review scores
Source	Rating
Cryptic Rock	4/5 stars
Exclaim!	Positive
Metal Injection	7/10
Metal Hammer	2.5/5 stars
MetalSucks	3/5 stars
New Noise	5/5 stars

== Track listing ==
No.	Title	Length
1.	"A New Day"	0:58
2.	"Nameless Walker"	3:36
3.	"Kings of Carnage"	2:55
4.	"Soul Eater"	2:12
5.	"From Failure, Comes Clarity"	4:04
6.	"Blood of My Enemy"	3:21
7.	"Snakeskin"	2:53
8.	"Never Alone"	4:25
9.	"5150"	3:50
10.	"Either Way You Lose"	3:51
11.	"A Walk Among the Dead"	3:07
12.	"Dark Waters"	3:58
Total length:		39:10

== Personnel ==
Winds of Plague

- Jonathan Cooke – lead vocals, bass
- Michael Montoya – lead guitar
- Justin Bock – rhythm guitar, bass
- Art Cruz – drums, percussion
- Adrienne Cowan – keyboards, clean vocals

Additional personnel

- Joakim Karlsson and Noah Sebastian – production, engineering
- Chris Collier – drum engineering
- Will Putney – mastering, mixing
- Jason Malhoyt and Davis Rider – management
- Carl Severson – A&R
- Pär Olofsson – artwork
