= Decimate the Weak =

Studio album by Winds of Plague
- Released: February 5, 2008
- Genre: Deathcore; symphonic metal
- Length: 36:50
- Label: Century Media
- Producer: Daniel Castleman

Winds of Plague chronology
A Cold Day in Hell (2005)	Decimate the Weak (2008)	The Great Stone War (2009)

Decimate the Weak is the debut studio album by American deathcore band Winds of Plague. Released February 5, 2008, the album is the first by Winds of Plague to be released through major label Century Media, and is the last to include drummer Jeff Tenney and keyboardist Matt Feinman. A music video for "The Impaler" was released.

In 2021, Joe Smith-Engelhardt of Alternative Press included the album in his list of "30 deathcore albums from the 2000s that define the genre".

== Promotion and release ==
The album features the songs "A Cold Day in Hell", "Anthems of Apocalypse", "Legions" and "One Body Too Many", all of which were originally available on their debut album, A Cold Day in Hell, but were re-recorded for Decimate the Weak.

Professional ratings
Review scores
Source	Rating
About.com	3/5 stars
AllMusic	3/5 stars
Lambgoat	4/10 stars

== Commercial performance ==
Decimate the Weak peaked at No. 9 on the Billboard Top Heatseekers chart and sold more than 3,600 copies its first week.

== Track listing ==
All tracks are written by Winds of Plague.

No.	Title	Length
1.	"A Cold Day in Hell"	1:14
2.	"Anthems of Apocalypse"	5:46
3.	"The Impaler"	3:01
4.	"Decimate the Weak" (featuring Sal Lococo of Sworn Enemy)	3:38
5.	"Origins and Endings"	4:30
6.	"Angels of Debauchery" (featuring John Cairoli)	4:32
7.	"Reloaded" (featuring John Mishima)	2:28
8.	"Unbreakable"	4:16
9.	"One Body Too Many"	3:35
10.	"Legions"	3:49
Total length:		36:50

== Personnel ==
Winds of Plague

- Jonathan "Johnny Plague" Cooke-Hayden – vocals
- Nick Eash – lead guitar
- Nick Piunno – rhythm guitar
- Andrew Glover – bass
- Jeff Tenney – drums
- Matt Feinman – keyboards

Additional musicians

- Sal Lococo of Sworn Enemy – guest vocals on track 4
- John Cairoli – guest vocals on track 6
- John Mishima – guest vocals on track 7

Additional personnel

- Daniel Castleman – production, engineering, recording
- Tue Madsen – mixing, mastering
