= Resistance (Winds of Plague album) =

Studio album by Winds of Plague
- Released: October 29, 2013
- Genres: Deathcore; metalcore; symphonic metal
- Length: 34:01
- Label: Century Media
- Producer: Will Putney

Winds of Plague chronology
Against the World (2011)	Resistance (2013)	Blood of My Enemy (2017)

Resistance is the fourth studio album by American deathcore band Winds of Plague. It was produced by Will Putney who has worked with bands such as Thy Art Is Murder and Stray from the Path.

== Critical reception ==
Professional ratings
Review scores
Source	Rating
Metal Temple	8/10 stars
Metal Injection	6.5/10 stars
Ultimate Guitar	4.8/10 stars

The album has garnered overall mixed reviews.

== Track listing ==
All tracks are written by Winds of Plague.

No.	Title	Length
1.	"Open the Gates of Hell"	2:26
2.	"Say Hello to the Undertaker"	3:45
3.	"Sewer Mouth" (featuring Vincent Bennett of The Acacia Strain)	3:09
4.	"Left for Dead"	3:37
5.	"One Foot in the Grave"	2:56
6.	"Time to Reap"	2:54
7.	"United Through Hatred" (featuring John Mishima)	2:18
8.	"Good Ol' Fashion Bloodbath" (featuring John Mishima)	3:29
9.	"No Man Is My Master" (featuring Jay Pepito of Reign Supreme)	3:20
10.	"Snake Eyes/Looking for a Better Day" (featuring Chris Fronzak of Attila)	6:22
Total length:		34:01

Notes

- The tracks "Snake Eyes" and "Looking for a Better Day" are different songs, with the latter starting at 3:32. However, on all releases of the album the two songs are combined into one track that is 6:22 long.

== Personnel ==
Winds of Plague

- Jonathan "Johnny Plague" Cooke-Hayden – vocals
- Nick Eash – lead guitar
- Nick Piunno – rhythm guitar
- Andrew Glover – bass
- Brandon Galindo – drums, percussion
- Alana Potocnik – keyboards

Additional musicians

- Vincent Bennett of The Acacia Strain – guest vocals on track 3
- John Mishima – guest vocals on tracks 7, 8
- Jay Pepito of Reign Supreme – guest vocals on track 9
- Chris Fronzak of Attila – guest vocals on track 11

Additional personnel

- Will Putney – production, engineering, mixing, mastering
- Danny Morrietta – artwork
