= Divine Infekt =

Studio album by Psyclon Nine
- Released: September 15, 2003
- Recorded: Corrosive Audio Studios in San Francisco, California
- Genre: Aggrotech; electro-industrial
- Length: 45:30
- Language: English
- Label: NoiTekk
- Producer: Da5id Din

Psyclon Nine chronology
Divine Infekt (2003)	INRI (2005)

Divine Infekt is Psyclon Nine's first studio album, released on September 15, 2003 by NoiTekk.

== Track listing ==
All songs were written by Ner0.

1. "Divine Infekt" – 4:01
2. "Tyranny" - 4:35
3. "Clinik" - 4:01
4. "Slaughter" - 3:41
5. "Resurrekt" - 4:31
6. "Payback" - 2:59
7. "Genocide" - 3:50
8. "Rusted" - 3:39
9. "So Be It" - 4:40
10. "As You Sleep" - 3:46
11. "Divine Infekt (Tactical Sekt UN version)" – 5:13

== Personnel ==
Psyclon Nine

- Nero Bellum - Vocals, Synthesizer, Programming
- Eric Gottesman - Live Synth
- Josef Heresy - Live Synth

Production

- Nero Bellum - Co-Producer
- Concept by Eric Gottesman and Nero Bellum
- Produced and mastered by Da5id Din
