= And Then Oblivion =

Studio album by Psyclon Nine
- Released: March 21, 2025
- Genre: Industrial metal; black metal; trap; industrial
- Length: 33:39
- Label: Metropolis Records

Psyclon Nine chronology
Less to Heaven (2022)	And Then Oblivion (2025)

Singles from And Then Oblivion
- 1. "I Choose Violence" Released: December 13, 2024; 2. "Devil's Work" Released: February 17, 2025

Professional ratings
Review scores
Source	Rating
All About the Rock	6/10
New Noise Magazine	10/10
Sputnikmusic	3.3/5

And Then Oblivion is the eighth studio album by American band Psyclon Nine. It was officially released through Metropolis Records on March 21, 2025. Psyclon Nine embarked on a month-long U.S. tour in support of the album, from January 31 to March 8, 2025, supported by Ventana, Antania, and Heathen Sun.

== Track listing ==
All tracks are written by Nero Bellum.

No.	Title	Length
1.	"Devil's Work"	3:10
2.	"I Choose Violence"	2:50
3.	"Shoot to Kill"	3:56
4.	"Crwling Frm Cnt T Cskt"	3:52
5.	"Locust of Everything"	3:23
6.	"Speak Evil"	4:08
7.	"Say Your Prayers"	3:32
8.	"Après Toi Le Dèluge"	4:31
9.	"Taxidermy"	4:17

== Personnel ==
Psyclon Nine

- Nero Bellum – vocals, all instruments
