= Icon of the Adversary =

Studio album by Psyclon Nine
- Released: August 24, 2018
- Genre: Black metal; dark ambient; industrial; industrial metal
- Length: 47:47
- Label: Metropolis Records

Psyclon Nine chronology
Order of the Shadow: Act 1 (2013)	Icon of the Adversary (2018)	Less to Heaven (2022)

Professional ratings
Review scores
Source	Rating
Soundscape Magazine	3/10
Sputnikmusic	4/5
Valkyrian Music	3.5/5

Icon of the Adversary is the sixth studio album by the American band Psyclon Nine. It was officially released through Metropolis Records on August 24, 2018, the band's first album since Order of the Shadow: Act I and remix album Disorder: The Shadow Sessions. Psyclon Nine embarked on a month-long New York tour in support of the album, from August 17 to September 9, 2018, with support from industrial punk band The God Bombs.

== Track listing ==
All tracks are written by Nero Bellum.

No.	Title	Length
1.	"Christsalis"	2:25
2.	"Crown of the Worm"	5:50
3.	"The Light of Armageddon"	2:56
4.	"Beware the Wolves"	3:52
5.	"Warm What's Hollow"	4:33
6.	"Behold an Icon"	1:53
7.	"When the Last Stars Die"	3:55
8.	"And With Fire"	5:04
9.	"Give Up the Ghost"	2:55
10.	"The Last"	14:24

“The Last” ends at 4:00 and contains a hidden ambient modular track that starts at 5:00 until 14:24. It is, however, removed on the LP version of the album.

== Personnel ==
Psyclon Nine

- Nero Bellum – vocals
- Rotny Ford – guitar, synth
- Tim Sköld – bass guitar
- Jon Siren – drums
