= Art Cruz =

American drummer (born 1988)

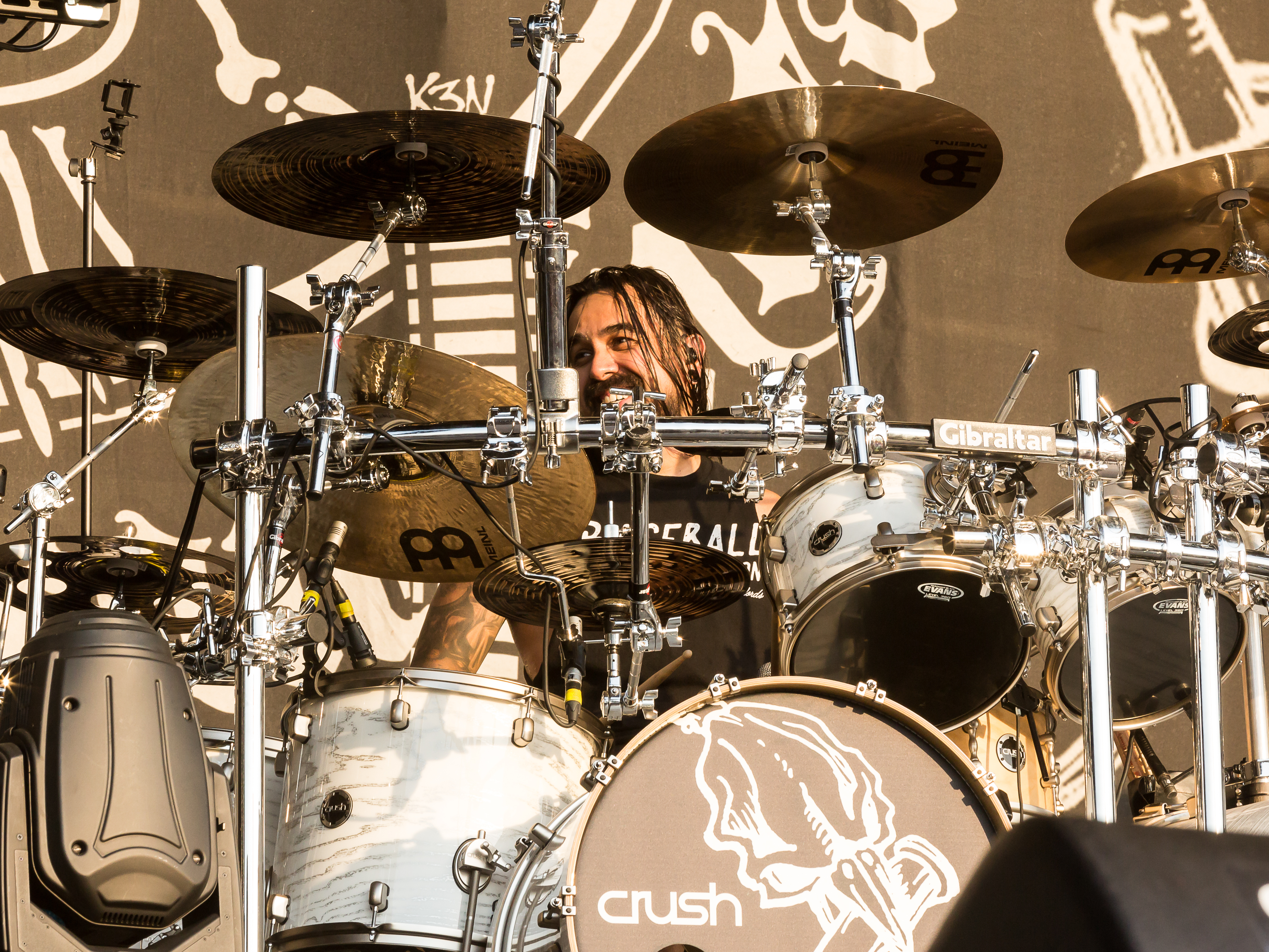
- Cruz performing with Lamb of God in 2019

Background information
- Born: May 27, 1988 (age 38); Downey, California, U.S.
- Genres: Groove metal; thrash metal; deathcore; metalcore
- Occupation: Musician
- Instrument: Drums
- Years active: 2008–present
- Member of: Lamb of God
- Formerly of: Winds of Plague; Prong; Azusa

Arthur Robert Peyton Cruz (born May 27, 1988) is an American musician, currently the drummer of heavy metal band Lamb of God. He is a former drummer of Winds of Plague and Prong.

== Early life ==
Cruz attended South El Monte High School in Southern California, joining the marching band percussion section during 2004–2006.

== Career ==
=== Winds of Plague ===
In 2008, Cruz was asked to join Winds of Plague and recorded the album The Great Stone War. The album peaked at No. 72 on the Billboard 200. In 2011 he performed on the band's next album, Against the World, which peaked at No. 60 on the Billboard 200. In 2012, Cruz left Winds of Plague, citing "creative differences". Cruz returned as their drummer in 2015 and would also perform on the album Blood of My Enemy in 2017. In 2021, he left Winds of Plague in order to focus on Lamb of God, which he officially joined in 2019.

=== Prong ===
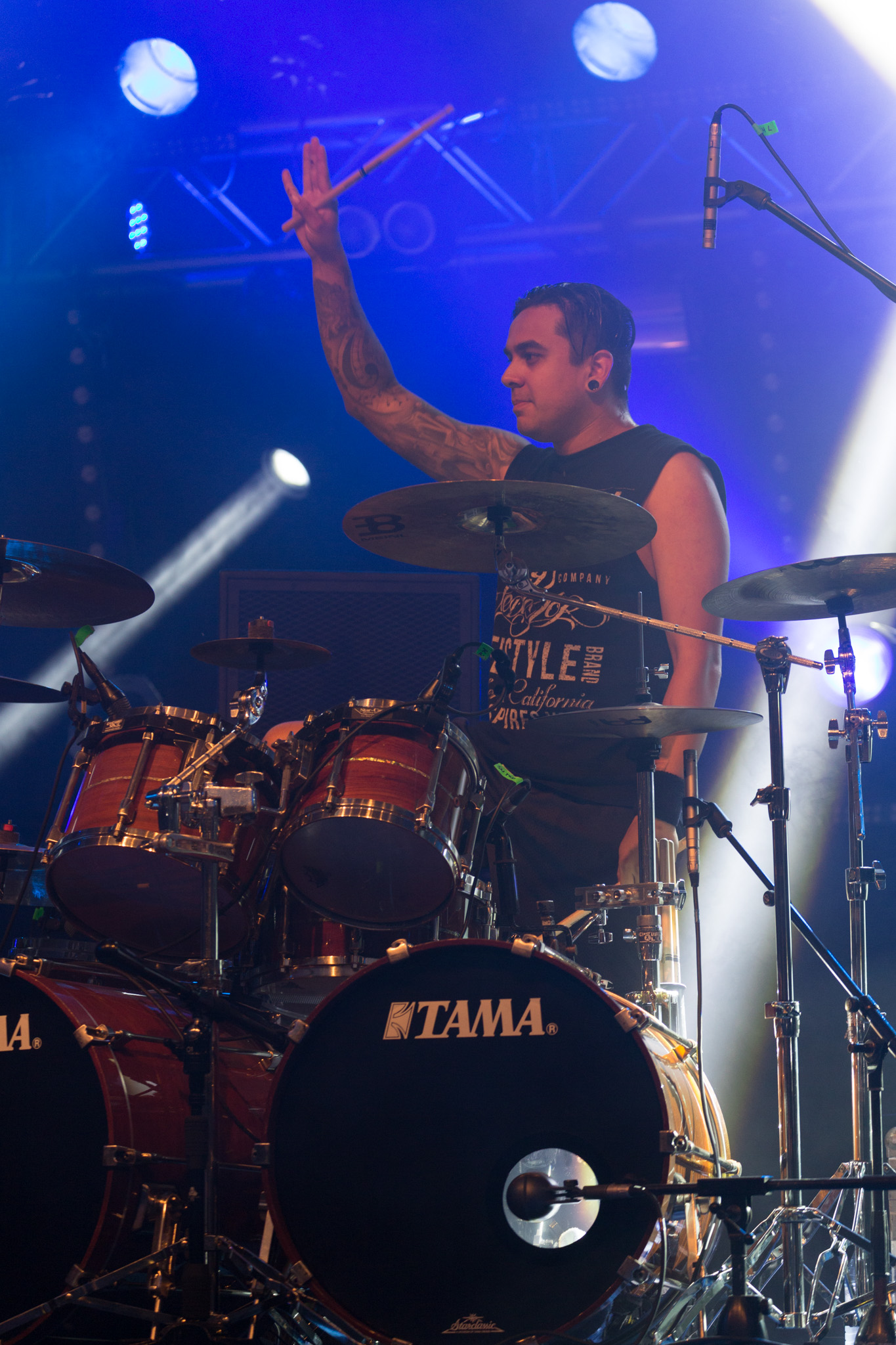
Cruz with Prong in 2014

Following his departure from Winds of Plague, Cruz was asked to play for Prong. Cruz has toured and recorded on their album Songs from the Black Hole. Cruz left Prong in 2018.

=== Klogr and The Rasmus ===
In 2017, Cruz collaborated on drums on the alternative metal project Klogr for the single "Technocracy" and a European tour with The Rasmus.

=== Lamb of God ===
In 2018, Cruz filled in for Chris Adler on Lamb of God's North American tour, which also included supporting Slayer on their farewell tour.

In 2019, he officially became the drummer for Lamb of God following Chris Adler's departure from the band.

Cruz's first release with Lamb of God was their 2020 self-titled album.

== Equipment ==
Cruz endorses Zildjian cymbals, and he uses Ludwig drums, Evans drumheads, Trick pedals, Gibraltar Hardware, and Vic Firth drumsticks.

== Discography ==
Lamb of God

- Lamb of God (2020)
- Omens (2022)
- Into Oblivion (2026)

Winds of Plague

- The Great Stone War (2009)
- Against the World (2011)
- Blood of My Enemy (2017)

Prong

- Songs from the Black Hole (2015)
- X – No Absolutes (2016)
- Zero Days (2017)
