= Psyclon Nine =

American electronic/metal band

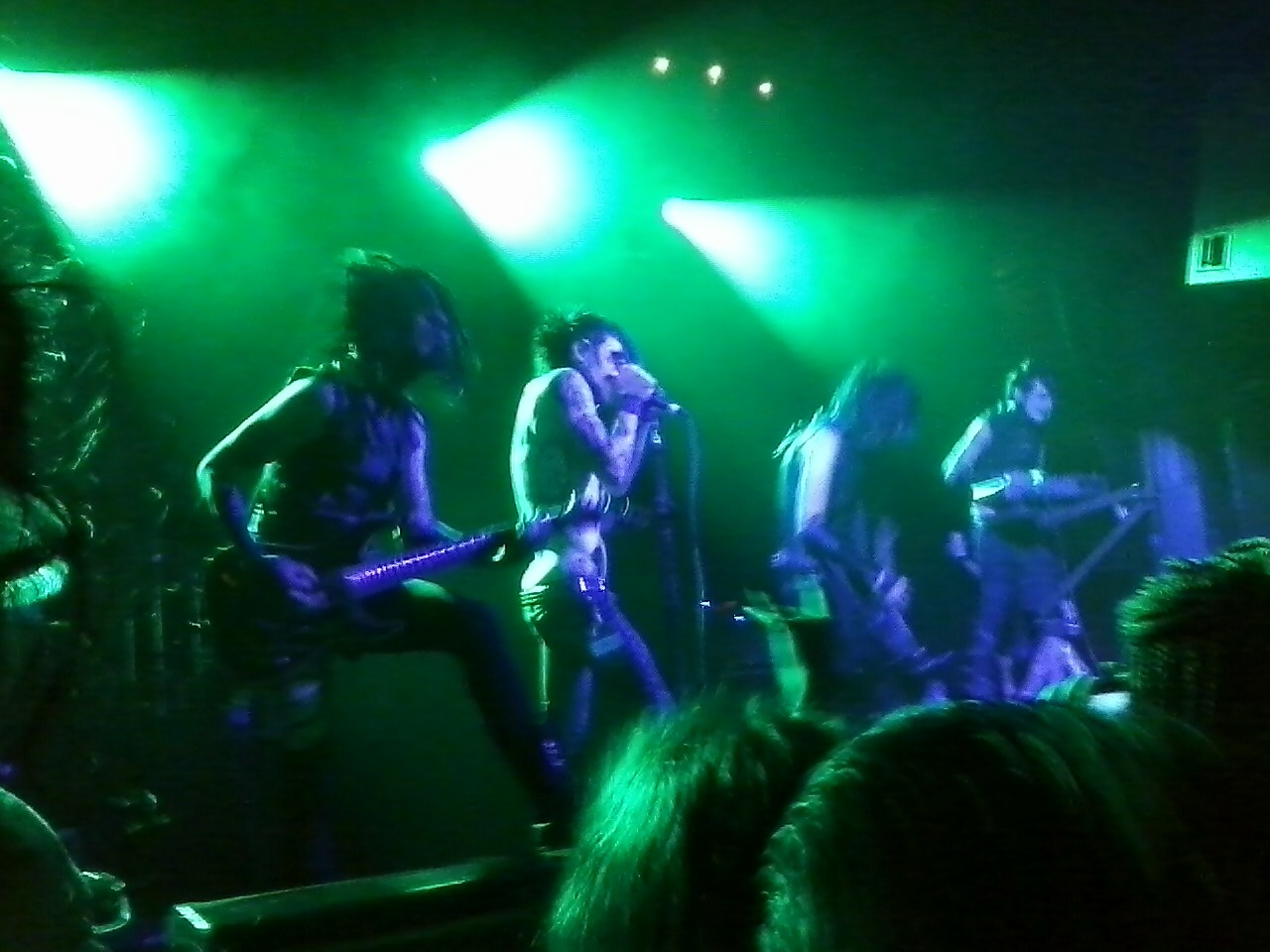
- Live from Triton Festival 2013

Background information
- Origin: San Francisco, California, United States
- Genres: Industrial metal; aggrotech; industrial rock; electro-industrial; black metal
- Years active: 1999–present
- Labels: Metropolis; NoiTekk Records
- Members: Nero Bellum; Jon Siren; Dante Phoenix; Todd Buller
- Past members: Josef Heresy; Eric Gottesman; Sevin; Abbey Nex; Raanen Bozzio; Brent Ashley; Kriz Dk; Glitch NIX; Merritt Goodwin; Vlixx Vaden; Daniel Fox; Daniel Columbine; Tim Sköld; Rotny Ford

Psyclon Nine is an American band formed in 2000 in San Francisco, CA, known for their unique blend of electronic, industrial metal. Originally, Psyclon Nine's music was Terror EBM with melancholic atmospheres and black metal style vocals. However, the band has since evolved a more industrial metal sound with black metal elements.

Psyclon Nine's main music contributor is lead vocalist, lyricist, multi-instrumentalist, and producer Nero Bellum, who is the only remaining original member. In 2009, Psyclon Nine's fourth album We the Fallen was the band's first and only album to appear on the Billboard Charts.

== History ==
=== Early days (1999–2003) ===
Psyclon Nine began in 1999 when roommates, Marshall Goppert and Josef Heresy created an industrial metal music project called "Defkon Sodomy", influenced by bands like KMFDM and Ministry. The band only performed under that name twice before changing it to Psyclon Nine. The name was a malapropism of Zyklon B, the trade name of hydrogen cyanide used in the gas chambers during the Holocaust. The “Nine” was used because of the number's significance in Aleister Crowley’s numerological writings. Around this time, Marshall and Josef took on their stage names as Josef Heresy, and Nero Bellum. Nero's name was taken from the Roman emperor, and Bellum is Latin for war.

=== Divine Infekt (2003–2004) ===
Bellum met with European NoiTekk record label executive Marco Gruhn at a San Francisco Grendel show, and persuaded him to sign Psyclon Nine. The band's first album Divine Infekt was recorded shortly thereafter, produced and engineered by Da5id Din of Informatik. The title track was remixed by Tactical Sekt and the album was released on September 15th, 2003.

Psyclon Nine toured lightly on the west coast in the United States and in Europe. They supported acts such as Dismantled, Nocturne, and Martin Atkins.

Bellum later said in an interview for Vampirefreaks about the Divine Infect remix, "Tactical Sekt's remix left a bad taste in my mouth", and attributed that to Anthony Mathers of Tactical Sekt in which his philosophical beliefs made him not want to collaborate with anyone outside of Psyclon Nine again.

=== I.N.R.I. (2004–2005) ===
In 2004, Psyclon Nine signed with the American industrial record label Metropolis and returned to Da5id Din's studio for mixing. INRI was released on April 26, 2005, on both Metropolis and NoiTekk Records. The album featured thirteen tracks of dark, aggressive electro focused on religious themes. The album also featured a cover of the Ministry song “You Know What You Are.”

In 2005, Nero Bellum met Rotny Ford of the industrial metal band Nocturne on the social networking site LiveJournal. The two discussed musical ideas which led to the band using guitars and drums in their live performances. Ford joined the band on keyboard and guitar.

Psyclon Nine made several major live appearances following the album's release, including several dates opening for Mindless Self Indulgence. The tour gained the band a fan base. Psyclon Nine returned to Europe for another tour that included a spot on the world's largest Gothic festival, Wave-Gotik-Treffen. It was around this time when drummer Abby Nex, who was also from Nocturne, joined the band as a live drummer.

=== Crwn Thy Frnicatr (2005–2008) ===
At the end of 2005, the band had dropped from their European label NoiTekk and Eric Gottesman quit the band. Gottesman was replaced by members of the industrial rock band Columbine: keyboardist VII and bassist Daniel Columbine.

With the release of Crwn Thy Frnicatr in 2006, Psyclon Nine began to stray from their early aggrotech sound into a darker black metal / industrial metal approach.

In late 2006, the band was featured on the cover of the German Gothic magazine Orkus.

Psyclon Nine went on their first headlining US tour, which eventually led to creative differences between the band and Columbine bassist Daniel. Daniel decided to leave the band at the end of the tour. Abbey Nex replaced him on bass, and Mushroomhead drummer Daniel Fox was used as a live fill-in drummer.

In early 2007, the band opened for Mushroomhead's 'Savor Sorrow' North American tour which gained the band huge attention among the underground extreme metal / industrial dance scene.

In May 2007, Psyclon Nine did a European tour that included a spot again at Wave Gotik Treffen. After the European tour, Rotny Ford decided to leave the band for personal reasons.

In October, the band opened for Mushroomhead again on their second North American tour with Josef on guitar and keys, Abbey on bass, VII on synth, and Daniel on drums.

In early 2008, the band released its first music video of the fan favorite track 'Parasitic' directed by Mushroomhead's Richard Thomas.

After the tour with Mushroomhead, Josef Heresy decided to leave the band to go back to college, and VII left to return to his band Columbine. Daniel Fox continued with Mushroomhead. At this time, Nero Bellum decided to move to Los Angeles, California, to begin writing a new album.

=== We the Fallen and first hiatus (2008–2010) ===
Nero Bellum appeared on the internet channel NoisescapeTV in 2008 and said that he was in the studio working on an album entitled We the Fallen, and has decided to stray away from the harsh EBM music style and incorporate a more black metal meets dark ambient sound.

In the fall of 2008, Bellum's mother committed suicide which delayed the album for several months. In early 2009, a MySpace blog Q&A video announced that Rotny Ford had rejoined the band, after reconciling at the funeral for Bellum's mother.

Bellum and Ford began the recording process for We the Fallen that included several guest spots including Brandan Schieppati from Bleeding Through, Gary Zon of Dismantled, Jamison Boaz of Epsilon Zero, and Johan van Roy of Suicide Commando. The album was produced by Jason Miller of Godhead and was released on September 9, 2009. It reached the top Billboard 500 sales and was sold in every Hot Topic store in the United States, which gave the band huge exposure across the nation.

In late 2009, Psyclon Nine embarked on a co-headlined tour with Imperative Reaction. Jon Siren of Mankind is Obsolete became the band's new full-time drummer, and Vlixx Vaden of HellTrash was the keyboardist. The tour was very hard on Bellum, and at the end of the tour he and his then-girlfriend separated.

On October 31, 2011, Psyclon Nine played their first show in over two years in New York City. Psyclon Nine played a few off dates together in 2012.

In 2011, Bellum went on tour with Dismantled as a live guitarist supporting their album The War Inside Me. He joined Dismantled again in 2012 for another tour of the United States with Accessory and Cyanide Regime as support.

In mid 2013, Bellum recorded guest vocals on extreme metal / aggrotech band Dawn of Ashes's new album, Anathema, and was featured in their music video for "Poisoning the Steps of Babel".

In late 2013, Bellum, Eric Gottesman, and Jon Heresy (the original members) played a one night show in San Francisco at the DNA Lounge, a venue that the band frequently performed at when first getting started. They played their first album Divine Infekt in its entirety for the album's 10 year anniversary.

Around the same time, Bellum announced on Psyclon Nine's Facebook page that the band's new album would be titled Order of the Shadow: Act 1, and would be released in November 2013 with the help of the band's Bandcamp website page that allowed fans to donate to help raise funds for the album's production. In return, fans would receive different sorts of merchandise. Chris Vrenna of Marilyn Manson and Nine Inch Nails helped produce a few tracks on the album.

After a long hiatus, Psyclon Nine went on their first US tour in over four years co-headlined with Dawn of Ashes. Both Ford and Siren returned, along with two musicians who were new to the band. They were bassist Merritt Goodwin and keyboardist Glitch Nix.

On November 12, 2013, Psyclon Nine released Order of the Shadow: Act I through Metropolis Records. The album continued the industrial black metal fusion previously heard on We the Fallen, but was heavily influenced by industrial rock, notably Marilyn Manson's Antichrist Superstar and Nine Inch Nails's The Downward Spiral.

In February 2014, the band released a music video for the track 'Use Once and Destroy' on YouTube.

On March 11, 2014, Psyclon Nine released a remix album entitled Disorder : The Shadow Sessions. It featured remixes of Order of the Shadow: Act I from Falling Skies, Die Sektor, Alien Vampires, Dismantled, MissFit Toys, Modern Weapons, and Life Cried.

=== Second hiatus (2014) ===
The band had booked a European tour for May 2014, however the merchandise from Bandcamp was never shipped to the people who donated. This left many fans to believe that Nero had stolen from them once again.

After the Bandcamp controversy, Ford and Siren posted on the official Psyclon Nine Facebook page that both had quit the band due to Bellum disappearing again, stating they felt he was irresponsible. Siren left a very apologetic letter to the fans on his personal Facebook page, explaining again how he and Ford had nothing to do with the Bandcamp donations.

On March 30, 2014, Nero Bellum explained on his personal Facebook page that he was in therapy and was unable to send out the Bandcamp orders. Due to Ford and Siren quitting the band and other misunderstandings, Nero felt it was time to put an end to Psyclon Nine, canceling their European tour.

Nero Bellum announced on his personal Facebook page that he wanted to perform one last series of concerts before putting an end to the band. Live band members consisting of guitarist Dorian Starchild, bassist Brent Ashley and drummer Kriz DK joined Psyclon Nine for their final performances.

A remix for the band Limnus entitled "The Devils Are Inside the Walls" (Psyclon Nine remix) was released in August 2014, followed by a second hiatus that lasted 8 months.

=== Reformed live band and Divine Infekt reissue (2015–2017) ===
On April 13, 2015, Psyclon Nine created a new official Facebook page and announced a live performance at the L.A. Dark United Underground in Los Angeles, CA on May 2, 2015. The reformed lineup featured Nero Bellum on vocals, Dorian Starchild on rhythm guitar, Ashes on lead guitar, and Raanen Bozzio on drums. They went on to do a few more shows (including a show at Bar Sinister in May 2015), resulting in Psyclon Nine returning as a live band. Bozzio was subsequently replaced by Anthem on electronic drums.

During mid to late 2015 and throughout 2016, Psyclon Nine resolved their former Bandcamp and Kickstarter merchandise controversies by partnering with merchandise management company Black Umbrella based in Las Vegas, NV. Psyclon Nine's Bandcamp page was also given a major graphical update in late 2015 and continues to carry older legacy merchandise along with signed albums and new apparel designs for fans to purchase. All merchandise shipments to fans have returned to a normal schedule of being sent out every Saturday.

On October 30, 2016, Psyclon Nine performed a special live set featuring songs exclusively from Divine Infekt, INRI and Crwn Thy Frnicatr. They played alongside label mates Dawn of Ashes for the first time in 3 years. Nero Bellum was also brought on stage during Dawn of Ashes' song "Poisoning The Steps of Babel" to provide vocals during his verse featured on the album. Bellum also provided backing vocals during the chorus.

On December 22, 2016, via Psyclon Nine's Facebook and Instagram pages, they announced the reissuing of their first album entitled "Divine Infekt". It was remastered by Nero Bellum and was made available in CD format and, for the first time ever, 12" vinyl format. The album was re-released via Metropolis Records on March 24, 2017.

During the spring of 2017, Psyclon Nine embarked on a small West Coast and East Coast tour entitled "Infektion Divinum". The tour was scheduled in tandem with the re-release of the band's first album "Divine Infekt". Psyclon Nine kept this tour exclusively "electronic" based sets in that it was performing songs from the albums "Divine Infekt", "INRI" and "Crwn Thy Frnicatr". This tour also marked the first time the band had ever played in Las Vegas, NV. Support acts for the tour included The Vile Augury, Lennon Midnight and Echo Black. During this time, Bellum also created a remix for York-based hardcore punk band, Seep Away, for their debut single, 'Trudge'.

=== Icon of the Adversary: Act 2 (2018–present) ===
Through mid to late 2017 via Nero Bellum's official Facebook page, he hinted at a new album being in the works. In early 2018, the new album was officially confirmed and is entitled "Icon of the Adversary: Act 2". The band debuted the first new single from the upcoming album called "Crown of the Worm" during a live performance in Downey, CA on February 24 as well as a teaser via Nero Bellum's official YouTube channel. The new album is tentatively planned for release in August 2018. The band also released a new shirt design via their Bandcamp page based on one of the songs entitled "Beware the Wolves". In June 2018, via the band's official Facebook page, tour dates for "Tour of the Worm" were announced.

Icon Of The Adversary was released on August 24, 2018, through Metropolis Records. Described as, "the epitome of dark metal industrial," with violent, mechanical drums, scathing vocals, punishing guitars and evil electronics. With Bellum saying, "he had to travel to a very dark place to make this album, & it shows."

== Band members ==
=== Current members ===
- Nero Bellum – lead vocals, keyboards, guitars (1999–present) bass (1999–2004, 2009–2012, 2014–present)
- Jon Siren – drums (2009–2014, 2018–present)
- Dante Phoenix – guitars (2022–present)
- Todd Buller – guitars, backing vocals (2023–present)

=== Former members ===
- Josef Heresy – keyboards (1999–2008), guitars (2006–2008)
- Eric Gottesman – keyboards (2000–2004), bass (2004–2006, 2007)
- Rotny Ford – guitars, backing vocals, keyboards (2005–2007, 2008–2014, 2015–2023), bass (2009–2012, 2015–2023)
- Abbey Nex – drums (2005–2006), bass (2007–2009)
- Sevin - keyboards (2006–2008, 2017–2018)
- Daniel Columbine – bass (2006)
- Daniel Fox – drums (2007–2008)
- Merritt Goodwin – bass (2012–2013)
- Brent Ashley – bass (2014)
- Dorian Starchild – guitars, bass (2014–2015)
- Vlixx – keyboards (2009)
- Glitch NIX – keyboards (2013–2014)
- Tim Sköld – guitars, bass (2018–2022)

== Discography ==
=== Studio albums ===
- Divine Infekt (2003)
- INRI (2005)
- Crwn Thy Frnicatr (2006)
- We the Fallen (2009)
- Order of the Shadow: Act 1 (2013)
- Icon of the Adversary (2018)
- Less to Heaven (2022)
- And Then Oblivion (2025)

=== Remix albums ===
- Disorder : The Shadow Sessions (2014)
- Versions: Icon of the Adversary Remixed (2019)

=== Demos, Singles and EP ===
- Divine Infekt Demos (2002) (Demo CD with 3 tracks: "Punished by Genocide", "As You Sleep" and "Tyranny")
- Use Once and Destroy (2013) (Single)
- Use Once and Destroy: Alterations : Abstractions : Aberrations [Psalms and Hymns of Perversion] (2014) (EP with 7 tracks: "Use Once and Destroy [Shadow Sequence - Original Song]", "Use Once and Destroy [Version - Bile]", "Use Once and Destroy [Version - Cyanotic]", "Use Once and Destroy [Version - Dismantled]", "Use Once and Destroy [Version - Human Factors Lab]", "Use Once and Destroy [Version: Aesthetic Perfection]" and "Use Once And Destroy [Case Study - Video Edit]")
- More to Hell (2023)
