= The Great Stone War =

Studio album by Winds of Plague
- Released: August 11, 2009
- Genres: Deathcore; symphonic metal
- Length: 37:17
- Label: Century Media
- Producer: Daniel Castleman

Winds of Plague chronology
Decimate the Weak (2008)	The Great Stone War (2009)	Against the World (2011)

Professional ratings
Review scores
Source	Rating
AllMusic	3/5 stars
Ashladan	7/10 stars
Blistering	7/10 stars
Lords of Metal	8/10 stars
Zware Metalen	(8.2/10)

The Great Stone War is the second studio album by American deathcore band Winds of Plague. It was released on August 11, 2009 through Century Media Records. The album also marks the recording debut of drummer Art Cruz and keyboardist Kristen Randall. The Great Stone War sold 6,300 copies in its first week of release to debut at No. 73 on The Billboard 200 chart. A cover of "Halloween" by Misfits appears as a bonus track on iTunes.

== Track listing ==
All tracks are written by Winds of Plague.

No.	Title	Length
1.	"Earth"	1:30
2.	"Forged in Fire" (featuring Martin Stewart of Terror)	3:35
3.	"Soldiers of Doomsday"	4:06
4.	"Approach the Podium"	3:40
5.	"Battle Scars"	3:25
6.	"Chest and Horns" (featuring John Mishima)	4:00
7.	"Creed of Tyrants"	2:45
8.	"Our Requiem"	4:14
9.	"Classic Struggle" (featuring Mitch Lucker of Suicide Silence)	3:20
10.	"The Great Stone War"	4:17
11.	"Tides of Change"	2:25
Total length:		37:17

iTunes bonus tracks
No.	Title	Length
12.	"Halloween" (Misfits cover)	1:52

Japanese bonus tracks (live at Shibuya Club Asia on September 23, 2009)
No.	Title	Length
13.	"Earth/Forged in Fire (live)" (featuring Martin Stewart of Terror)	4:55
14.	"Approach the Podium (live)"	3:31
15.	"The Impaler (live)"	3:08
16.	"Reloaded (live)"	2:59

== Personnel ==
Winds of Plague

- Jonathan "Johnny Plague" Cooke-Hayden – lead vocals
- Nick Eash – lead guitar
- Nick Piunno – rhythm guitar
- Andrew Glover – bass, engineering assistance
- Art Cruz – drums, percussion
- Kristen Randall – keyboards, clean vocals

Additional

- Martin Stewart of Terror – featured vocals on tracks 2, 13
- John Mishima – featured vocals on track 6
- Mitch Lucker of Suicide Silence – featured vocals on track 9

Production and miscellaneous staff

- Daniel Castleman – production, engineering
- Tue Madsen – mixing, mastering
- Brian Lawlor and Ryan Kelly – orchestral arrangements
- Ash Avildsen – booking
- Steve Joh – A&R
- Pär Olofsson – artwork
- Rob Kimura – layout, design
