= Against the World (album) =

Studio album by Winds of Plague
- Released: April 19, 2011
- Genres: Deathcore; symphonic metal
- Length: 38:37
- Label: Century Media
- Producer: Matt Hyde

Winds of Plague chronology
The Great Stone War (2009)	Against the World (2011)	Resistance (2013)

Against the World is the third studio album by American deathcore band Winds of Plague. It was released on April 19, 2011 through Century Media Records. Against the World features guest appearances from members of Hatebreed, Terror, For Today, Stray from the Path, and retired professional wrestler The Ultimate Warrior (who performs a spoken-word track entitled "The Warrior Code"). Music videos have been released for "Drop the Match", "California", and "Refined in the Fire", breaking the band's prior pattern of having no more than one video released per album. An unreleased song, a cover of The Cranberries song "Zombie", was released with the iTunes Store EP for "California". Against the World charted at number 60 on the Billboard 200, making it Winds of Plague's highest charting album.

Professional ratings
Review scores
Source	Rating
AllMusic	3.5/5 stars
MetalSucks	3/5 stars
The New Review	4.5/5 stars
Revolver	4/5 stars

== Track listing ==
Against the World track listing
No.	Title	Length
1.	"Raise the Dead"	1:31
2.	"One for the Butcher"	4:29
3.	"Drop the Match"	3:34
4.	"Built for War" (featuring Jamey Jasta of Hatebreed)	3:41
5.	"Refined in the Fire" (featuring Mattie Montgomery of For Today)	3:07
6.	"The Warrior Code" (featuring The Ultimate Warrior)	1:30
7.	"Against the World"	4:02
8.	"Monsters" (featuring Drew York of Stray from the Path)	3:47
9.	"Most Hated"	3:40
10.	"Only Song We're Allowed to Play in Church Venues"	1:52
11.	"California" (featuring Martin Stewart of Terror and John Mishima)	3:29
12.	"Strength to Dominate"	3:55
Total length:		38:37

B-side from California EP
No.	Title	Length
1.	"Zombie" (The Cranberries cover)	4:40

FYE Edition bonus disc
No.	Title	Length
1.	"The Impaler" (live)
2.	"One Body too Many" (live)
3.	"Chest and Horns" (live)
4.	"Decimate the Weak" (live)
5.	"Angels of Debauchery" (live)
6.	"Refined in the Fire" (live)
7.	"Brotherhood" (live)
8.	"Reloaded" (live)

== Personnel ==
Winds of Plague

- Jonathan "Johnny Plague" Cooke-Hayden – vocals
- Nick Eash – lead guitar
- Nick Piunno – rhythm guitar
- Andrew Glover – bass, engineering
- Art Cruz – drums, percussion
- Alana Potocnik – keyboards

Additional musicians

- Jamey Jasta of Hatebreed – guest vocals on track 4
- Mattie Montgomery of For Today – guest vocals on track 5
- The Ultimate Warrior – guest vocals on track 6
- Drew York of Stray from the Path – guest vocals on track 8
- Martin Stewart of Terror – guest vocals on track 11
- John Mishima – guest vocals on track 11

Additional personnel

- Matt Hyde – production, engineering
- Sid Garcia and Chris Rakestraw – engineering
- Brian Lawlor and Ryan Kelly – orchestral arrangements
- Pär Olofsson – artwork
- Daniel McBride – layout

== Charts ==
Chart performance for Against the World
Chart (2011)	Peak position
US Billboard 200	60
US Independent Albums (Billboard)	6
US Top Hard Rock Albums (Billboard)	3
US Top Rock Albums (Billboard)	13
