= Winds of Plague =

American deathcore band

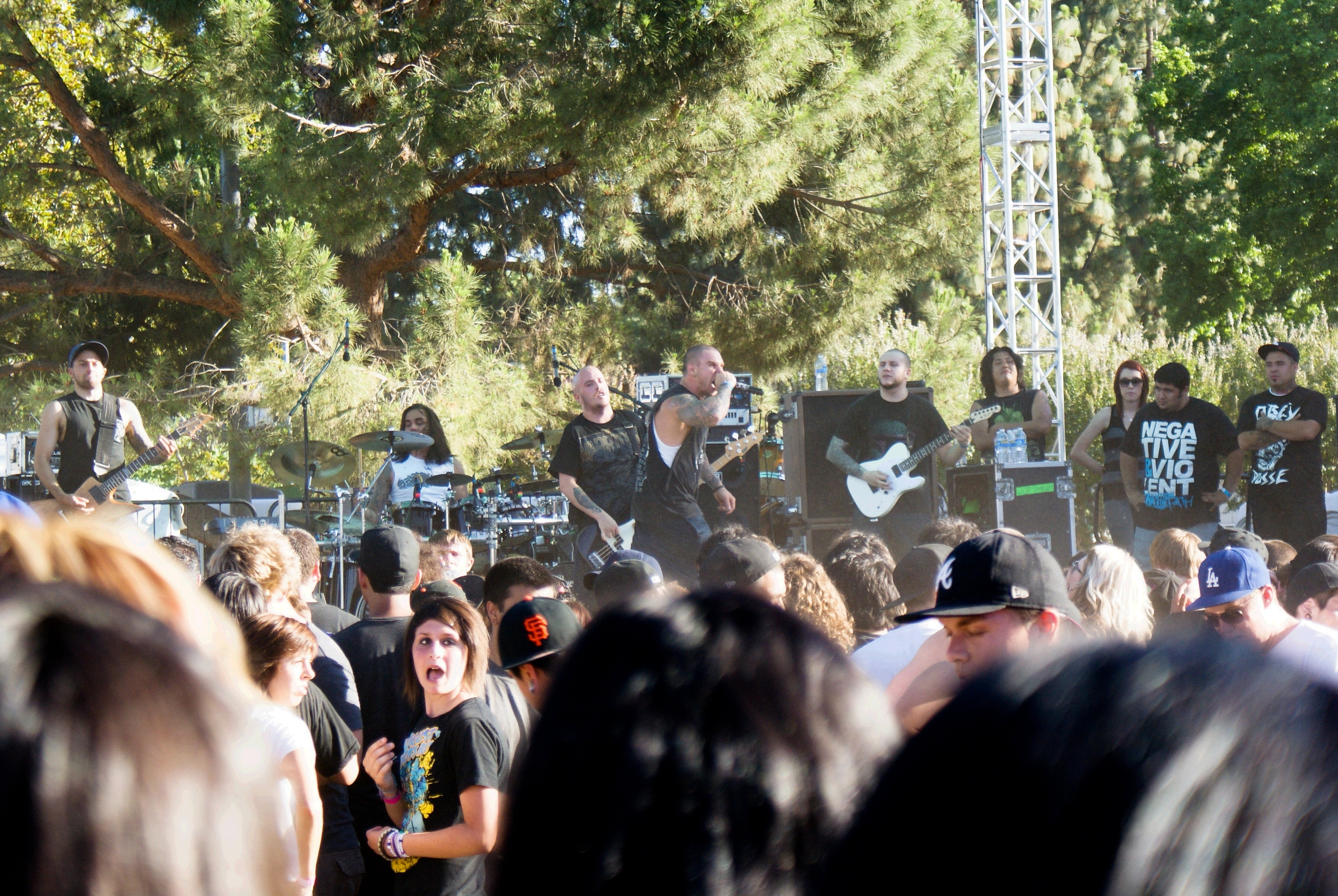
- Winds of Plague performing in 2010

Background information
- Also known as: Bleak December (2002–2005)
- Origin: Upland, California, U.S.
- Genres: Deathcore; metalcore; symphonic metal
- Years active: 2002–present
- Labels: eOne; Good Fight; Century Media; Seventh Dagger; Recorse
- Members: Jonathan Cooke-Hayden; Nick Eash; Nick Piunno; Andrew Glover; Art Cruz
- Past members: Josh Blackburn; Raffi; Brandon Pitcher; Michael Montoya; Paul Salem; Justin Bock; Adrienne Cowan; Shane Slade; Josh Johnson; Corey Fine; Kevin Grant; Chris Cooke; Matt Feinman; Jeff Tenney; Kristen Randall; Lisa Marx; Brandon Galindo; Tyler Riley; Davey Oberlin; Chris Silva; Alana Potocnik
- Website: Winds of Plague on Facebook

Winds of Plague is an American deathcore band from Upland, California. Formed in 2002, the band is known for being one of the first deathcore bands to incorporate symphonic elements into their music.

The band's name is derived from a section of lyrics in the Unearth song "Endless": "Growing wings of sorrow/have brought you to the winds of plague."

== History ==
=== Formation, name change, and early releases (2002–2005) ===
Winds of Plague was founded in 2002 in Upland, California. During the time of the band's inception, its name was originally Bleak December. However, they changed their name in April 2005, to Winds of Plague, being named after a lyric from the Unearth song, "Endless". They released their demo A Cold Day in Hell in late 2005 independently. Several of the songs would subsequently be re-recorded for the following album.

=== Decimate the Weak (2006–2009) ===
Decimate the Weak, the band's first album for Century Media Records, was released in 2008. The album included several re-recorded tracks from A Cold Day In Hell.

=== The Great Stone War and line-up changes (2009–2011) ===
The Great Stone War was released on August 11, 2009. The album features two singles, "Approach the Podium" and "Chest and Horns", though no music videos were ever shot for any songs on the album. On October 14, 2009, keyboardist Kristen Randall stated that she would be leaving the band and did so days afterward. The band approached musician Lisa Marx to fill in on keyboard for their Australian/New Zealand tour. Afterwards the band found Alana Potocnik who has since been inducted as Winds of Plague's keyboardist.

=== Against the World (2011–2013) ===
Against the World was released in 2011 to widespread critical acclaim. "Refined in the Fire" and "California" have been released as singles, and music videos for "Drop the Match", "California" and "Refined in the Fire" have also been released. The band also appeared on the soundtrack for the game Homefront performing a cover of the Buffalo Springfield song "For What It's Worth". A cover of "Zombie" by The Cranberries was included in an iTunes extended play for "California", but the EP was later removed from the iTunes store for unknown reasons.

=== Resistance (2013–2016) ===
Winds of Plague's fourth studio album, Resistance, was recorded in early to mid-2013 and was released on October 29, 2013.

In December 2015, while playing the Affliction Metal Show at The Observatory in Santa Ana with Suicide Silence, vocalist Johnny Plague announced that after going through a brief hiatus, Winds of Plague would resume touring and working on a new album in 2016.

=== Blood of My Enemy (2017–present) ===
Winds of Plague's fifth studio album, Blood of My Enemy, was recorded from 2016 to 2017 and was released on October 27, 2017.

== Tours ==
The band has toured with Despised Icon, Parkway Drive, Impending Doom, Danzig, Dimmu Borgir, Veil of Maya, With Dead Hands Rising, and As Blood Runs Black. They also played at the New England Metal and Hardcore Festival, toured the US on the "Blackest of the Black" tour and finished a 2010 Japan tour with Parkway Drive, 50 Lions, Despised Icon, The Warriors, and Terror. They were featured on The Atticus Metal Tour with Emmure, All Shall Perish, Abacabb, Terror, and The Ghost Inside. In the summer of 2009 was in the Summer Slaughter tour with Necrophagist, Suffocation, Darkest Hour and others. After the Summer Slaughter tour, they joined Hatebreed, Chimaira, Dying Fetus, and Toxic Holocaust on the Decimation of the Nation tour. On January 20, 2010, it was announced that Winds of Plague would be playing on the Jägermeister Stage at the 2010 Rockstar Mayhem Festival in July and August. During April 2010, Winds of Plague toured with Despised Icon, The Warriors, Parkway Drive, and 50 Lions for Parkway Drive's UK and Europe Tour. During February 2011, Winds of Plague toured in the US with After the Burial and headliners As I Lay Dying. They played several songs from their then upcoming new album. They played the entire Warped Tour 2011 on the Advent Clothing stage along with The Acacia Strain, Set Your Goals, We Came As Romans and others. They will also be headlining the 2011 "Thrash and Burn" tour with Chelsea Grin, As Blood Runs Black, and numerous others. They replaced All Shall Perish during Caliban's "Get Infected" Tour 2012 with support of We Butter the Bread with Butter, Eyes Set To Kill and Attila which started off on February 2 in Karlsruhe, Germany. For their 2014 tour supporting Bleeding Through, with Scars of Tomorrow and Lionheart, Johnny Plague was unable to perform due to undisclosed circumstances. Rather than leave the tour, the band opted to have Mike Milford (of Scars of Tomorrow) fill in on vocals. The band did a tour in February 2017 with DevilDriver, Death Angel, The Agonist, and Azrael. Just recently, the band also did a tour on the first ever Chaos & Carnage tour supporting Carnifex. Oceano, Archspire, Spite, Buried Above Ground, Shadow of Intent and Widowmaker were also on the tour.

== Band members ==
Current

- Jonathan "Johnny Plague" Cooke-Hayden – lead vocals (2002–present); bass (2002–2004, 2015, 2017–2018)
- Andrew Glover – bass (2006–2015, 2025–present)
- Nick Eash – lead guitar (2002–2015, 2025–present); rhythm guitar, bass (2002–2004); keyboards (2003–2004, 2025–present)
- Nick Piunno – rhythm guitar (2002–2015, 2025–present); lead guitar, bass (2002–2004); keyboards (2003–2004, 2025–present)
- Art Cruz – drums (2008–2012, 2015–2022, 2025–present)

Former

- Corey Fine – additional percussion (2002–2005); drums (2003–2005); keyboards (2003–2004)
- Josh Blackburn – guitars, bass (2002)
- Raffi – drums (2002–2003)
- Brandon Pitcher – keyboards (2002–2003)
- Paul Salem – bass, keyboards (2003–2004)
- Jeff Tenney – drums (2004–2008)
- Kevin Grant – bass (2004–2006)
- Chris Cooke – keyboards (2004–2006)
- Matt Feinman – keyboards (2006–2008)
- Kristen Randall – keyboards, clean vocals (2008–2009)
- Lisa Marx – keyboards (2009)
- Alana Potocnik – keyboards (2009–2017)
- Brandon Galindo – drums (2012–2015)
- Tyler Riley – guitars (2013–2015)
- Davey Oberlin – rhythm guitar (2015–2017)
- Chris Silva – bass (2017)
- Michael Montoya – lead guitar (2015–2018)
- Justin Bock – rhythm guitar (2017–2018); bass (2015–2017, 2017–2018)
- Adrienne Cowan – keyboards, clean vocals (2017–2018)
- Shane Slade – bass (2018; touring member 2017–2018)
- Josh Johnson – drums (2017–2018)

Timeline

== Discography ==
Winds of Plague discography
- Studio albums: 5
- Music videos: 6
- Demos: 4

=== Studio albums ===
List of studio albums, with selected chart positions
Title	Album details	Peak chart positions				
Title	Album details	US	US Heat.	US Indie.	US Rock	US Hard Rock
Decimate the Weak	Released: February 5, 2008; Label: Century Media; Formats: CD, digital download	—	9	—	—	—
The Great Stone War	Released: August 11, 2009; Label: Century Media; Formats: CD, digital download	72	—	—	25	9
Against the World	Released: April 19, 2011; Label: Century Media; Formats: CD, digital download	60	—	6	13	3
Resistance	Released: October 29, 2013; Label: Century Media; Formats: CD, digital download	165	—	29	50	18
Blood of My Enemy	Released: October 27, 2017; Label: eOne, Good Fight; Formats: CD, digital download	—	—	16	—	24
"—" denotes a recording that did not chart or was not released in that territory.

Demos

Album title	Release date	Label
Bleak December	2002	Independent
Demo 2004	2004	Independent
A Cold Day in Hell	June 19, 2005	Recorse
Demo 2006	August 24, 2006	Independent

Other releases

Album title	Release date	Label
Stronger Than All (split album)	February 5, 2008	Seventh Dagger

Music videos

- (2008) "The Impaler" (from the album Decimate the Weak)
- (2011) "Drop the Match" (from the album Against the World)
- (2011) "California" (from the album Against the World)
- (2013) "Open the Gates of Hell" (from the album Resistance)
- (2013) "Say Hello to the Undertaker" (from the album Resistance)
- (2017) "Never Alone" (from the album Blood of My Enemy)
