= Klogr =

Italian-American alternative metal band

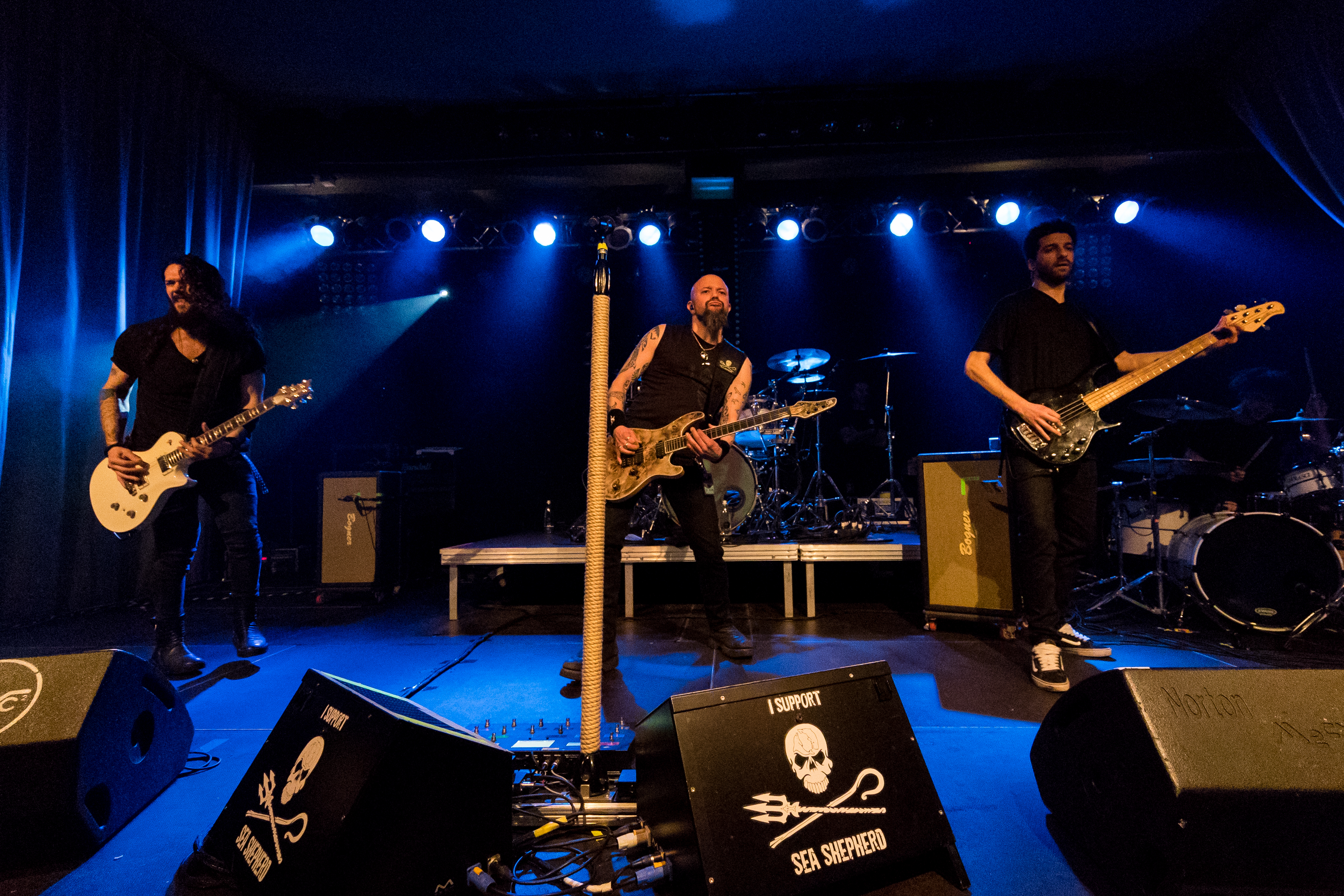
- Klogr in Mannheim 2018

Background information
- Origin: Carpi, Emilia-Romagna, Italy
- Genres: Alternative metal; alternative rock; progressive metal
- Years active: 2011-present
- Labels: Zeta Factory, The End Records
- Members: Gabriele "Rusty" Rustichelli; Rob Galli; Pietro Quilichini; Maicol Morgotti
- Past members: Eugenio Cattini; Art Cruz; Giampaolo "Giampi" Viesti; Stefano "Ste" Mazzoli; Nicola Briganti; Todd Allen; Filippo De Pietri; Giovanni "Joba" Vignali; Rob Iaculli
- Website: www.klogr.net

Klogr (pronounced "Kay-Log-Are") is an Italian-American alternative metal band with progressive metal influences. The band's name is a tribute to a psycho-physical law (S=KlogR) developed in the 19th century by experimental psychologist Ernst Heinrich Weber and German philosopher Gustav Fechner.

== History ==
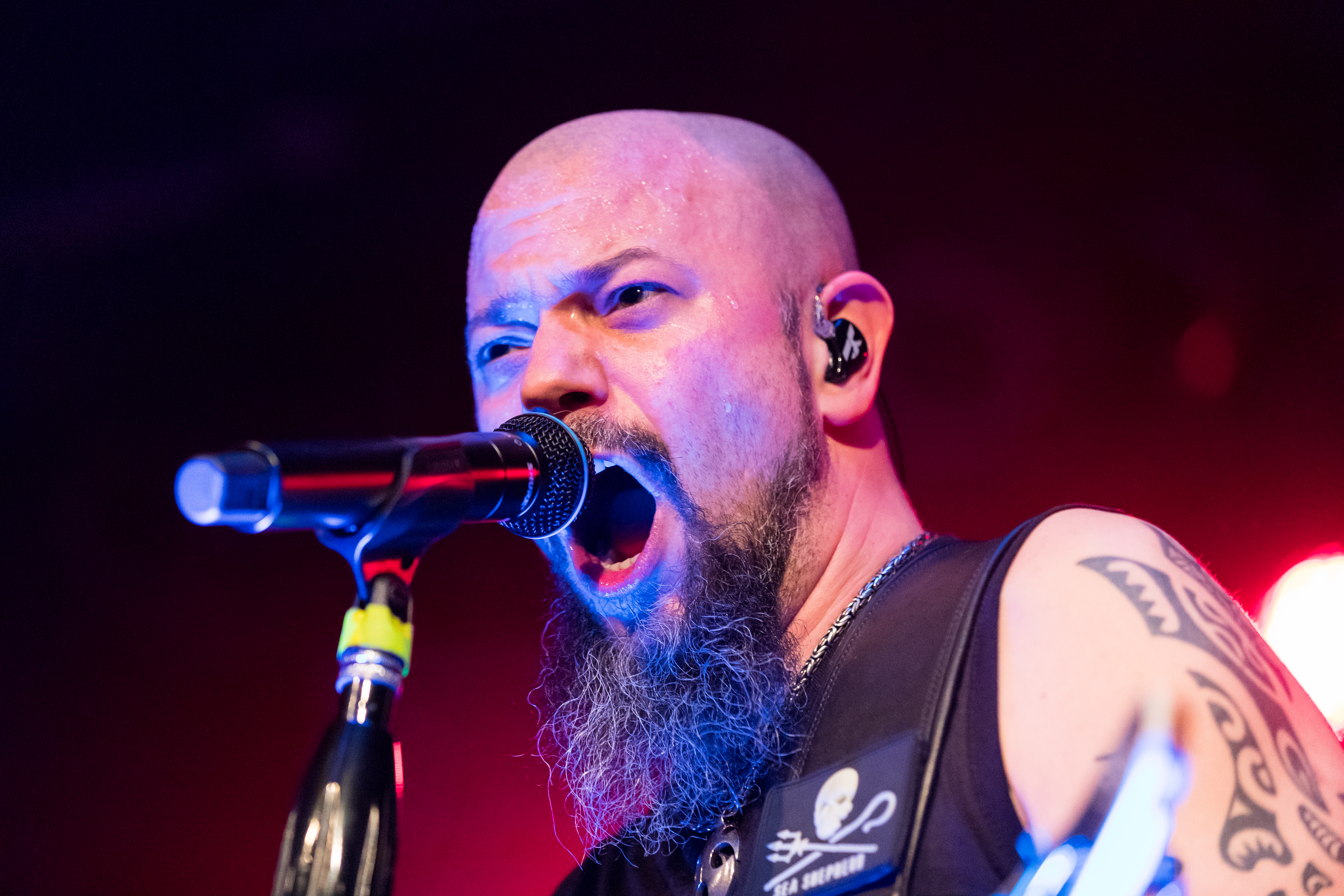
Klogr in Mannheim 2018

In 2011 is released the band's first album "Till You Decay" with line up including Rusty (vocals), Todd Allen, Nicola Briganti. Two videoclips "Bleeding" and "Silk and Thorns" are released from the debut.

In 2013 Klogr subdues a line-up change, incorporating all three members of alternative rock band Timecut. The new line up (Rusty, Joba, Giampi and Ste) releases the EP "Till You Turn", with the collaboration of Lacuna Coil's Maki, producer Logan Mader (Machine Head) and singer Alteria.

Videoclips from the EP include "King of Unknown" and "Guinea Pigs" (supporting Sea Shepherd).

In June 2013 Klogr played at the Sweden Rock Festival.

In 2014 Klogr release second full-length concept album "Black Snow" (Zeta Factory / The End Records), focusing their lyrics and communication on environmental-conscious subjects. Collaborates on Black Snow, Destrage's bass player Ralph Salati. The US digital edition of "Black Snow" contains EP "Till You Turn" and the Live album "Ground Zero 11-11-11 ".

In February 2014 Klogr release the video "Draw Closer".

In March–April 2014 Klogr share a 23 dates European Tour with Prong.

In May 2014 Klogr's frontman contributes, along with Prong's drummer Art Cruz, to Loudwire's viral initiative in memorial of Slayer's guitarist Jeff Hanneman with a short clip included in the official #ScreamForJeff pilot presentation.

A new single: Zero Tolerance dedicated to Sea Shepherd's mission in Taiji in defense of the bay's dolphins is released. Digital download income is devolved to support the activities of the sea wildlife protection organization. In June 2014 Klogr release through a premiere on Metalinsider their first Lyric Video for the song Hell of Income.

While working on a DVD which will see the light in 2015, in September 2014 Klogr release a live video for Failing Crowns: 23 shows condensed into 4 minutes. On September 17, 2014, a major turning point for Klogr: with the new line up consisting of Rusty on vocals and guitars, Pietro on guitars, Joba on bass and Rob on drums, the band leaves behind its status of a "project band" to become a band with a steady line up. In October 2014 Klogr are on the road again for a Tour in Russia with Living Dead Lights (USA).

In December 2014 Klogr release a video for the ballad Ambergris, edited by Sea Shepherd Italy and work on the release of a new EP with producer Roberto Priori. In May 2015 the band release Make Your Stand, an EP with three new songs, ten live audio tracks plus a DVD containing a long documentary on the band and a full live show Live in Trezzo. Make Your Stand is anticipated by single and video Breaking Down. On June, 13th 2015 Klogr are the only opening act for Limp Bizkit's concert in Florence at the Obihall Theatre. A video of "Make Your Stand" is filmed during such occasion.

In April 2016 Klogr announce the release of a new single "Breathing Heart", shot at the historical Carpi Theatre and featuring milanese actress Veronica Sogni and the name of the producer who will work on the band's third album "Keystone": 3 Time Grammy Award Winning Producer David Bottrill

On October 6, 2017, Klogr publish, through their label Zeta Factory, the long-awaited album "Keystone" preceded by two singles "Prison of Light" and "Sleeping through the seasons." In November 2017, Klogr start a 10-day European tour with Finnish rock band The Rasmus. Special guest on drums for the tour and for the RMX video of "Technocracy" is Prong's drummer Art Cruz. Several tour dates are sold-out months before the concerts.

In early 2018 Klogr come back with the release of a new video for the single "Pride before the Fall" and the announcement of an extensive European Tour with American heavy metal band Butcher Babies. A new line-up is announced.

== Band members ==
=== Current members ===
- Gabriele "Rusty" Rustichelli - vocals, guitar
- Alessandro "Crivez" Crivellari - guitar, back vocals
- Roberto "Piv-o" Pivanti - bass
- Filippo "Filo" De Pietri - drums

=== Former members ===
- Pietro Quilichini - guitar
- Eugenio Cattini - guitar
- Art Cruz - drums
- Giampaolo "Giampi" Viesti - guitar
- Stefano "Ste" Mazzoli - drums
- Nicola Briganti - guitar
- Todd Allen - bass
- Filippo De Pietri - drums
- Giovanni "Joba" Vignali - bass
- Rob Iaculli - drums

=== Live members ===
- Michele Zanni - bass
- Luca Maurizi - bass
- Federico Bruni - drums
- Maicol Morgotti - drums

== Discography ==
=== Albums ===
- Till You Decay (2011)
- Black Snow (2014)
- Keystone (2017)
- Fractured Realities (2024)

=== EPs ===
- Till You Turn (2013)
- Make Your Stand (2015)

=== Live albums ===
- Ground Zero 11-11-11 (2014)

=== DVDs ===
- Live in Trezzo (2015)
