= Less to Heaven =

Studio album by Psyclon Nine
- Released: August 19, 2022
- Genre: Black metal; industrial; industrial metal; industrial rock
- Length: 39:39
- Label: Metropolis Records

Psyclon Nine chronology
Icon of the Adversary (2018)	Less to Heaven (2022)	And Then Oblivion (2025)

Singles from Less to Heaven
- 1. "Money and Sex and Death" Released: June 3, 2022; 2. "See You All In Hell" Released: August 19, 2022

Professional ratings
Review scores
Source	Rating
Brutal Resonance	6.5/10
Sputnikmusic	4.6/5

Less to Heaven is the seventh studio album by the American band Psyclon Nine. It was officially released through Metropolis Records on August 19, 2022 (originally scheduled for August 5, 2022). Psyclon Nine embarked on a month-long U.S. tour in support of the album, from June 7 to July 3, 2022, with support from Seven Factor and Our Frankenstein.

== Track listing ==
All tracks are written by Nero Bellum.

No.	Title	Length
1.	"Blood In"	3:18
2.	"See You All in Hell"	3:50
3.	"Money and Sex and Death"	3:42
4.	"The Poison Will Deaden the Pain"	2:52
5.	"Off With Their Heads"	4:23
6.	"X's on Her Eyes"	4:43
7.	"Catastrophic"	5:03
8.	"Après Moi Le Dèluge"	5:43
9.	"Blood Out"	5:04

== Personnel ==
Psyclon Nine

- Nero Bellum – vocals, all instruments
