= We the Fallen =

Studio album by Psyclon Nine
- Released: September 8, 2009
- Genre: Industrial metal; black metal; aggrotech
- Length: 49:11
- Label: Metropolis
- Producer: Jason Miller

Psyclon Nine chronology
Crwn Thy Frnicatr (2006)	We the Fallen (2009)	Order of the Shadow: Act 1 (2013)

Professional ratings
Review scores
Source	Rating
Sphere	4/5 stars

We the Fallen is the fourth studio album by American band Psyclon Nine. The album was released on September 8, 2009, through Metropolis Records. This is the first album released by Psyclon Nine with new members Vlixx and Jon Siren.

The concept behind We the Fallen created by frontman Nero Bellum was the idea of himself as a "heartworm". Bellum had begun to "look at people like emotional parasites, worming their way into the hearts of their victims in order to have some sort of influence on their actions." The album takes a dark view on the concept of love and relationships.

== Track listing ==
1. "Soulless (The Makers Reflection)" [Featuring Johan Van Roy] - 2:14
2. "We the Fallen" - 5:24
3. "Heartworm" - 5:12
4. "Thy Serpent Tongue" - 5:10
5. "Bloodwork" - 4:39
6. "The Derelict (God Forsaken)" - 2:21
7. "Widowmaker" - 4:41 (Featuring Brandan Schieppati)
8. "There But For the Grace of God" - 4:54
9. "Of Decay (An Exit)" - 1:09
10. "Suicide Note Lullaby" - 4:51
11. "As One With the Flies" - 3:43
12. "Under the Judas Tree" - 4:54

== Personnel ==
Psyclon Nine

- Nero Bellum – vocals, guitar
- Rotny Ford – guitar, synth, samples
- Abbey Nex – bass
- Vlixx – synth, keys, percussion
- Jon Siren – drums, percussion, samples

Production

- Jason Miller – tracking, mixing
