= Dawn of Ashes =

American industrial metal band

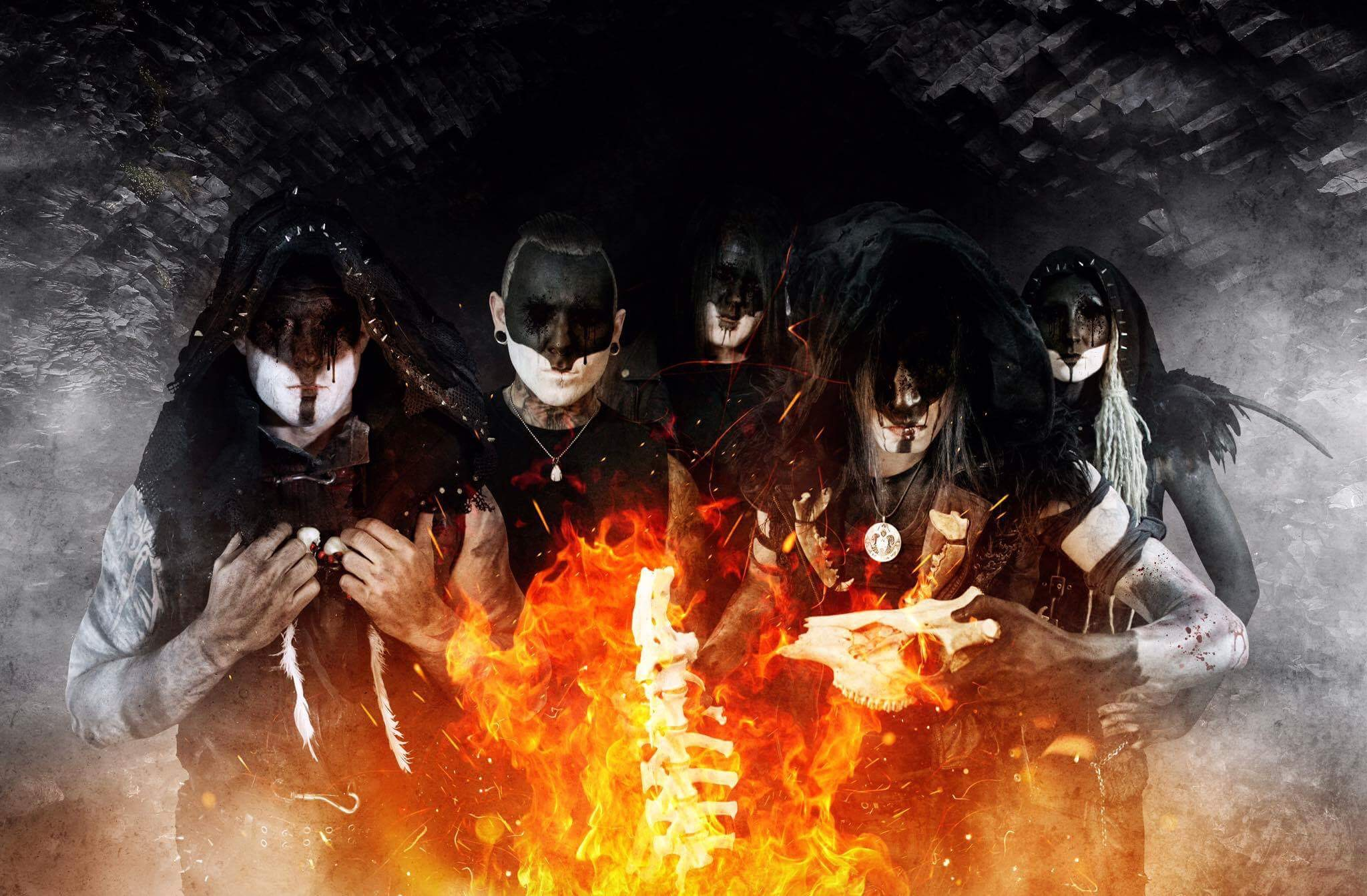
- Dawn of Ashes 2016

Background information
- Origin: Los Angeles, California
- Genres: Industrial metal; black metal; extreme metal; aggrotech; EBM (early)
- Years active: 2000–2014, 2016–present
- Labels: Artoffact; Metropolis; Metal Blade
- Members: Kristof Bathory; Bahemoth; Krz Souls; Angel Nightmare; Krock

Dawn of Ashes is an American industrial metal band from Los Angeles, California, United States. Formed in 2000, the band's style consists of horror-based lyrical and visual themes presented through industrial and melodic black metal structures.

The name Dawn of Ashes is an allegorical metaphor meaning "beginning of the end".

== History ==
=== Early years/dark electronic-industrial phase ===
Founded in 2000, Dawn of Ashes' initial concept was the production of horror based dark electronic music, sometimes known as Terror EBM, hellektro or aggrotech, characterised by heavily using samples from horror films. In the intervening five years before the release of Sacred Fever, Dawn of Ashes would expand to include two new members: Joey-Tekk and Bahemoth after having several line-up changes that failed to work.

Sacred Fever, released in 2005 delivered a sample filled terror EBM soundscape that thematically and lyrically would define Dawn of Ashes into the future.

The release of Sacred Fever saw DoA signed to German electronic label NoiTekk with US distribution via COP International and Russian distribution handled by Gravitator Records. Subsequent to their signing, DoA released the album In the Acts of Violence (2006) continuing the use of samples from horror films to match the dark and aggressive horror themed lyrics.

Early 2007 saw the departure of Joey-Tekk and the addition of female band member Rayne who had worked with Dawn of Ashes on parts of In The Acts of Violence. Work progressed on the follow-up album and March 3, 2007 saw the first inklings of Dawn of Ashes future logo to go with the debut of the release The Crypt Injection.

The Crypt Injection was significant for being the first album to deliver a music video for the track "Torture Device." Bathory worked closely with Bahemoth on putting the clip together, and this would further define their relationship in years to come with future videos.

During these years Dawn of Ashes also created a number of remixes for several bands including Suicide Commando, Grendel, Regenerator, Neikka RPM, FGFC820, Helalyn Flowers, Retractor and many others.

=== Melodic black metal phase ===
In late 2008 Dawn of Ashes announced a new line-up and a new direction for the band's music - melodic black metal, via their MySpace page. Bathory had always been a fan of heavier styles of metal music and felt that the time was right to begin producing it under the DoA name. In order to facilitate the new direction of the band, DoA added new members to the band including Abaddon Mauvais, Cyanide, and Orias.

Band members would end up being replaced (much like the early dark electronic years) in 2010, with Rahab and Volkar Kael joining the band for the recording of the release Genocide Chapters. Released on the label Metal Blade Records to strong reviews, Genocide Chapters was noted for its production and the bands switch from an aggrotech act to a melodic death metal band.

Unfortunately, there would be yet another line-up change with Rahab departing for Othuum sometime in 2010, who would tour with the band on the Darkness Reborn Tour alongside headliners Dimmu Borgir, Enslaved and Blood Red Throne. This tour would assist in growing the fan base of Dawn of Ashes, spreading Bathory's horror gimmick around the US.

=== Industrial/melodic black metal phase ===
Prior to their departure from Metal Blade Records, Dawn of Ashes released the EP Farewell to the Flesh, a release that saw a return of DoA's early electronic elements. Shortly following the release saw Othuum and Volkar Kael leave the band over creative differences. There was no rancour in the split, with Othuum and Volker confirming this. Bathory's response saw the confirmation of Rayne staying on as a band member whilst simultaneously announcing a return to sole proprietorship over Dawn of Ashes' future creative direction.

Dawn of Ashes also took the time to record another music video for the track "Fuck Like You're in Hell" - again demonstrating Kristof Bathory's creative and horrifying vision and once more executed by Bahemoth.

With the addition of a new guitarist Syrus in 2012 and working with industrial music legend Chris Vrenna producing (who coincidentally also produced tracks for Mortiis), Dawn of Ashes recorded a substantial amount of material culminating in the 2013 release Anathema to critical review. Anathema features a "rebuild" of one of DoA's older dark electronic tracks "Torture Device, The Final Formula for Torment", and guest vocals from fellow electronic artists Nero Bellum (Psyclon Nine) and Gary Zon (Dismantled).

The release of the album saw the creation of a new music video (featuring Nero Bellum) for the track "Poisoning the Steps of Babel", again executed by Bahemoth and a tour "The Hellions of Hollywood", with Dawn of Ashes and Psyclon Nine co-headlining. Touring from late August to early October, including performing at the VampireFreaks event Triton Festival in New York City, the band returned to Los Angeles to record new material.

2013 also saw the beginnings of references to the "Judas Breed", part of the title to the track "Insidious (of the Judas Breed)" from Anathema. This title formerly had since gone on to become the name of the collective of Dawn of Ashes fans and was used by Kristof Bathory to address Dawn of Ashes fandom.

Bathory expressed his satisfaction with Anathema's sound and has indicated that he would like to continue to reconcile his love for electronic and metal based music into future Dawn of Ashes material.

=== Break-up and return ===
On December 28, 2013 the band announced via their Facebook, that the "Enter the Vortex" Tour would be the band's final tour, and after the conclusion of the tour, the band would be breaking up.

On January 4, 2014, Kristof Bathory was interviewed by Radiobuzzd in an event where Kristof cited numerous reasons for the break up of Dawn of Ashes, including potential legal complications around himself and the band's name. However, Bathory said that moving into the future he would continue to produce music alongside Bahemoth and Syrus.

Bathory also said that the planned album Enter the Vortex, that originally was to go alongside the tour deeming the same name, will also not be going ahead into recording. The tour was cancelled.

Kristof Bathory has announced that as of 2016, Dawn of Ashes will return, signed to Metropolis Records. A new album was announced to coincide with the label deal, titled Theophany. On September 27, 2016 the band announced new member Brandon "Rage" Richter, formerly of Motionless in White. They released a new album, Daemonolatry Gnosis, on June 9, 2017.

== Members ==
=== Current ===
- Kristof Bathory – vocals (2001–present)
- Bahemoth – keyboards, electronics (2005–present)
- Krz Souls – electronic drums (2014–present)
- Angel Nightmare – guitars, keyboards (2019–present)
- Krock – drums (2019–present)

=== Former ===
- Ken (Raum) Menard
- Cieran McGrath
- Sidney Pirata
- Jon Siren
- Brandon "Rage" Richter
- Angel Dies
- Rayne Xiaphiam
- Orias
- Othuum
- Volkar Kael
- Rahab
- Abaddon Mauvais
- Cyanide
- Joey-Tekk
- Grey Soto
- Sean Von Helvete
- Syrus
- Levi Xul
- David Langlois
- Brendin Ross – keyboards
- Dracul Grotesque – bass

== Discography ==
- Dawn of Ashes (2005)
- Sacred Fever (2006)
- Cut the Flesh (2006)
- In the Acts of Violence (2006)
- The Crypt Injection (2007)
- Harvest the Impaled (EP) (2008)
- Genocide Chapters (2011)
- Farewell to the Flesh (EP) (2012)
- Hollywood Made in Gehenna (Split) (2012)
- Anathema (2013)
- Theophany (2016)
- Daemonolatry Gnosis (June 9, 2017)
- The Crypt Injection II (Non Serviam) (2019)
- The Antinomian (2020)
- Scars of the Broken (2022)
- Reopening the Scars (2024)
- Infecting the Scars (2025)
- Anatomy of Suffering (2026)
