= Crwn Thy Frnicatr =

Studio album by Psyclon Nine
- Released: October 23, 2006
- Recorded: Corrosive Audio Studios in San Francisco, California and Event Horizon in Castro Valley, California
- Genre: Aggrotech; electro-industrial; industrial metal
- Length: 57:37
- Language: English
- Label: Metropolis Records
- Producer: Marshall Carnage and Da5id Din

Psyclon Nine chronology
| INRI (2005) | Crwn Thy Frnicatr (2006) | We the Fallen (2009) |

Crwn Thy Frnicatr is Psyclon Nine's third studio album, released on October 23, 2006 by US label, Metropolis Records, and on November 10, 2006 by German label, NoiTekk. On the cover of the album, are the words "All who stand before me shall be judged."

== Track listing ==
1. "Bellum in Abyssus" (Nero Bellum) – 1:26
2. "Parasitic" (Bellum) – 4:53
3. "Better Than Suicide" (Bellum, Eric Gottesman) – 5:10
4. "Anaesthetic (For the Pathetic)" (Bellum, Josef Heresy) – 4:02
5. "The Room" (Bellum) – 1:23
6. "Flesh Harvest" (Bellum) – 4:21
7. "Scar of the Deceiver" (Bellum, Heresy, Gottesman) – 4:03
8. "Crwn Thy Frnicatr" (Bellum, Heresy) – 4:33
9. "Visceral Holocaust" (Bellum, Gottesman) – 5:11
10. "Proficiscor of Terminus Vicis" (Bellum) – 4:01
11. "The Purging (A Revelation of Pain)" (Bellum, Gottesman) – 4:10/18:30
12. "Evangelium Di Silenti (Track 0)" (Bellum) (hidden track in Metropolis Records release) – 4:45

In the Metropolis Records release, Evangelium di Silenti is an unlisted, hidden song that begins at 8:54 in The Purging (A Revelation of Pain) after 4:44 of silence rather than being a separate track.

== Personnel ==
- Nero Bellum – vocals, guitar
- Josef Heresy – guitar, synthesizer
- Rotny Ford – guitar, synthesizer
- Filip Abbey – drums

== Release history ==
| Region | Date | Label | Format | Catalog |
|---|---|---|---|---|
| United States | October 23, 2006 | Metropolis Records | CD | MET 0456 |
| Germany | November 10, 2006 | Noitekk | CD | NTK 024 |
| Russia | March 26, 2007 | Gravitator Records | CD | GRR 024 |
