= Dismantled =

American electronic music artist

- Born: Gary Zon
- Origin: United States
- Genre: Electro-industrial
- Occupation: Musician
- Years active: 2001–present
- Labels: Metropolis Records dependent
- Website: www.dismantled.org

Dismantled (born Gary Zon) is an electronic music artist from the United States.

== History ==
Dismantled is the product of an experiment that began in late 2000 by Gary Zon, who was attempting to create something similar to Front Line Assembly's sound. After overwhelming positive feedback from online listeners, Gary began further sonic construction by drawing influences from television, movies, and music as well as adding vocals into the mix. The resulting sound was a unique blend of very melodic, yet complex mix of layered electro-industrial merged with intelligent dance music elements. This dark, brooding, futuristic ensemble yielded more and more positive feedback, while comparing it to Front Line Assembly, Haujobb, Wumpscut and Velvet Acid Christ.

Dismantled's first and only demo release came in March 2001 through mp3.com. Demo Variation was sent to labels and radio stations. After four months of waiting, the demo caught the attention of dependent, who released the track "Purity" on their Septic II compilation alongside of such bands as Apoptygma Berzerk, Front Line Assembly, and VNV Nation. In late October 2001, Metropolis Records contacted Zon and expressed interest in working with Dismantled.

In 2002, another Dismantled song, "Survivor," landed a place on the Dystopian Visions Resist the Command 2 compilation, and Dismantled won a re-mix contest for Wumpscut's "Wreath of Barbs." The self-titled debut of Dismantled was released June 4 on Metropolis Records for North America and dependent for Europe. Several media publications named Dismantled the electronic newcomer of the year for 2002.

Dismantled's 2004 second release, Post Nuclear, set a new standard for aggro-electro. Gary also added supporting members to the live line-up; "Loud" Chris DeMarcus on keys/percussion, Adrian White on Drums, Jimie Kurczodyna on bass/keyboards, and Dale on bass/keyboards. Not only were there aggressive and edgy songs, but also tracks with a softer side that help to offset the release. Atmospheric layers drenched in crunchy synths, distorted beats, growling vocals, clean melodies, and cleverly hidden samples highlighted the different aspects of Post Nuclear.

After the success of the critically acclaimed album, Post Nuclear, Dismantled remained busy in the studio preparing their next album, Standard Issue, which was released in 2006. As a preview of the album, Dismantled presented the Breed To Death EP. Described by Gary Zon himself as having a "predictable, club-oriented sound that is a reaction to the social grid surrounding me at the present time," Breed to Death is designed for the clubs. A fusion of 80's, electro-clash, and trance alongside traditional electro elements and harsh synthetics, the title track was meant to exaggerate and stereotype the new wave of electro, as well as balance the edge and complexity inherent in Dismantled's music. It was supporting Standard Issue that brought the band to Europe to perform for 2007's Wave-Gotik-Treffen. There Zon was supported by Brian DiDomenico on keyboards and Jon Siren on drums, both of Mankind Is Obsolete.

More recently, Gary Zon is also involved in two side projects. One is Aerodrone, an electroclash band signed to Warner/Cordless Records. The other, which includes female vocalist TZA, is called no.not.never. No.not.never's sound is that of melodic futurepop and alternative rock.

Dismantled has since participated in tours supporting Combichrist in the US in 2009 and in Europe in 2010 featuring the lineup of TZA on keyboards and Jon Siren on drums with an appearance at GothicFest in the Netherlands supporting Skinny Puppy revealing some new tracks for the upcoming album. On June 14, 2011, Zon is slated to release The War Inside Me on Metropolis Records.

== Discography ==
=== Albums ===
- Dismantled (2002)
- PostNuclear (2004)
- Standard Issue (2006)
- When I'm Dead (2007)
- The War Inside Me (2011)

=== Singles and EPs ===
- "Dystopia" (2002)
- Exit (2003)
- Breed to Death (2005)
- "Anthem" (web release – also included as a single on limited-edition version of Standard Issue) (2006)
- Thanks for everything (2006)
- Whole Wide World (2012)
- The Hero (2016)
- "No Escape" (2020)
- "Zero" (2026)
