= Aerodrone =

American electro-rock band

- Origin: Eugene, Oregon, United States
- Genres: New wave; dance-punk; rock; electro
- Years active: 2005–present
- Labels: Cordless

Aerodrone is an American dance-punk band from Eugene, Oregon, that was founded in 2005 by Gary Zon. Aerodrone is a mix between new wave, rock, and electro, heavily influenced by both rock and electronic elements. According to interviews, Zon is responsible for composing much of the music digitally. The band has had a number of interchanging members, currently with Gary Zon on vocals, TZA on keyboards, and Joel Adkins on guitar.

== Biography ==
Aerodrone quickly gained popularity on MySpace after becoming a featured band in the Summer of 2006. In Spring of 2007 the band signed a record deal with Cordless Recordings of Warner Music Group.. Since then, the band has had a deal with Myspace Records as well as other prominent outlets such as TrueAnthem.com, MTVU, and Hot Topic.

In 2011, Aerodrone's Ready to Love song was featured in Vector Stunt, a rhythm flash game.

== Members ==
- Gary Zon: Vocals, Keys & Programming
- TZA: keys/synth/vocoder
- Joel Adkins: drums/hair

=== Studio ===
- Gary Zon: Vocals / composition
- Joel Adkins: Drums / guitar (2009–present)
- Tonya Pugh: All keyboards (2007–present)
- Kevin Patrick Miller: All guitars from 2005 until 2009

== Discography ==
- Aerodrone Demo - 2005
- The Spin EP - 2006
- Sceneboy EP - 2008
- Ready To Love EP - 2010
