= INRI (Psyclon Nine album) =

Studio album by Psyclon Nine
- Released: April 26, 2005
- Recorded: 2005 at Pod 6 Studios and Corrosive Audio Studios in San Francisco, California
- Genre: Aggrotech; electro-industrial
- Length: 60:35
- Language: English
- Label: Metropolis Records
- Producer: Marshall Carnage and Eric Gottesman

Psyclon Nine chronology
Divine Infekt (2003)	INRI (2005)	Crwn Thy Frnicatr (2006)

Alternative cover
- NoiTekk and Gravitator Records album cover

Professional ratings
Review scores
Source	Rating
Chain D.L.K.	4.5/5 stars

INRI is Psyclon Nine's second studio album, released on April 26, 2005, by Metropolis Records in the US and NoiTekk in Germany. INRI comes from the Latin phrase which, translated into English, means "Jesus the Nazarene, King of the Jews". The songs are of the dark, aggrotech genre focusing on religious themes. The album contains a cover of Ministry's "You Know What You Are". The original edition has an album cover depicting a topless devil woman, and was only sold in European stores. The US edition's cover is that of the band's logo and bloody wings lying below it.

== Track listing ==
1. "INRI" (Ner0, Eric Gottesman) – 6:11
2. "Behind a Serrated Grin" (Ner0) – 4:51
3. "The Feeding" (Ner0, Gottesman) – 4:09
4. "Lamb of God" (Ner0, Gottesman, Josef Heresy) – 5:06
5. "Hymn to the Angels' Descent" (Ner0, Gottesman) – 4:37
6. "Rape This World" (Ner0, Heresy) – 4:34
7. "The Feeble Mind" (Ner0, Gottesman) – 4:43
8. "Requiem for the Christian Era" (Gottesman) – 3:16
9. "Faith: Disease" (Ner0, Heresy, Gottesman) – 4:36
10. "Harlot" (Ner0, Gottesman) – 5:05
11. "The Unfortunate" (Ner0) – 2:50
12. "Nothing Left" (Ner0, Gottesman) – 6:17
13. "You Know What You Are" (Ministry) – 4:17 (Ministry cover)

== Personnel ==
- Nero Bellum – vocals, lyrics, guitar
- Eric Gottesman – lyrics, bass
- Josef Heresy – synthesizer
- Marisa Lenhardt – vocals on "Requiem for the Christian Era"

== Release history ==
Region	Date	Label	Format	Catalog
United States	April 26, 2005	Metropolis Records	CD	MET 369
Germany	April 26, 2005	Noitekk	CD	NTK 018
Russia	November 14, 2007	Gravitator Records	CD	GRR 052
