= Sacrament Tour =

2006–07 concert tour by Lamb of God

Sacrament World Tour
- World tour by Lamb of God
- Location: North America; Europe; Asia; Australia; New Zealand
- Start date: July 15, 2006
- End date: December 17, 2007
- Legs: 11
- No. of shows: 237

Lamb of God concert chronology
- Ashes of the Wake Tour (2004–05); Sacrament World Tour (2006–07); Wrath Tour (2008–09)

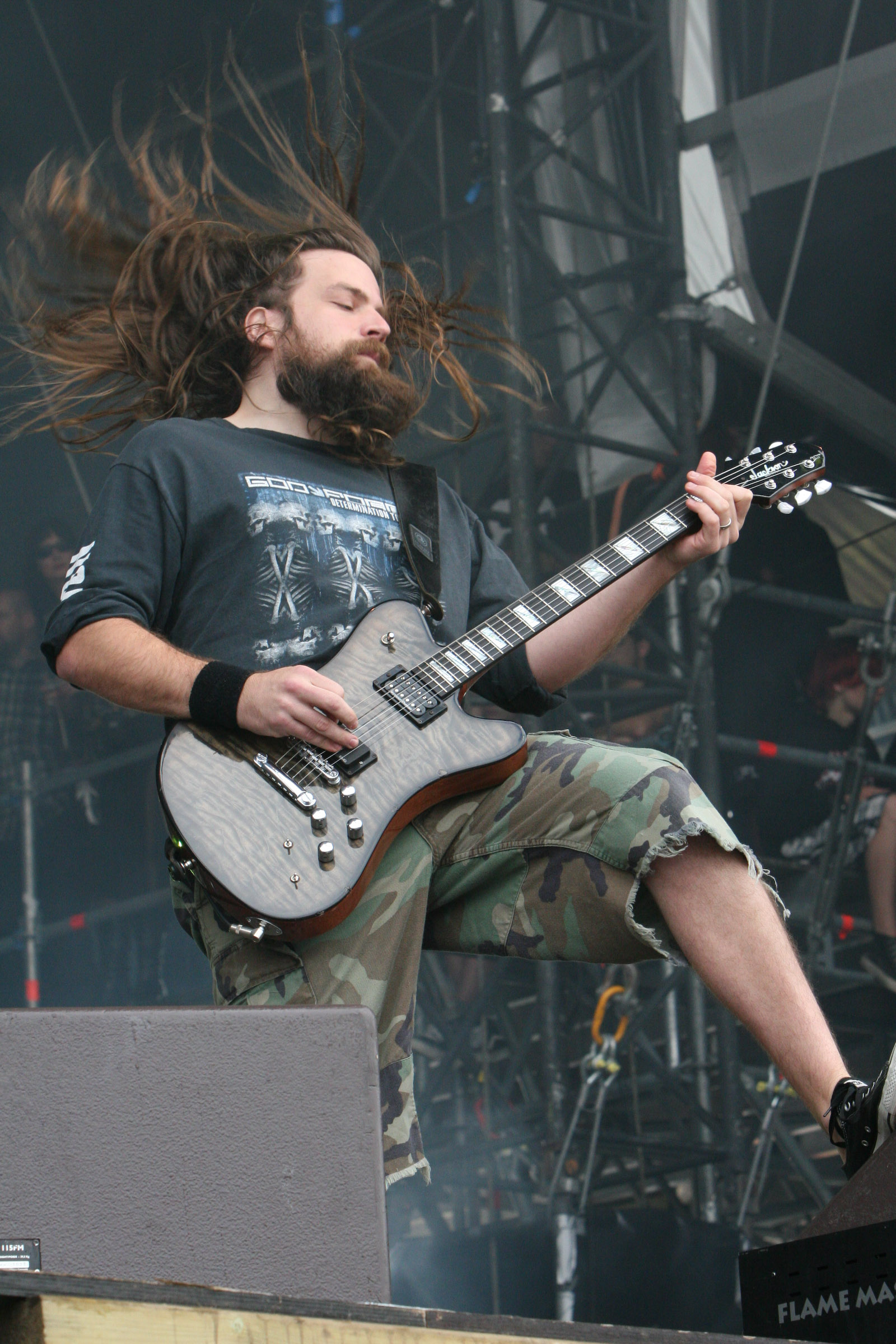
Guitarist Mark Morton performing at the With Full Force music festival in 2007.

The Sacrament World Tour was a concert tour by American heavy metal band Lamb of God. It was in support of the band's 5th studio album Sacrament. It was the biggest tour the band has done to date; and their new DVD, Walk with Me in Hell, which was released on July 1, 2008, contains a documentary and live footage from the World Tour.

== History ==
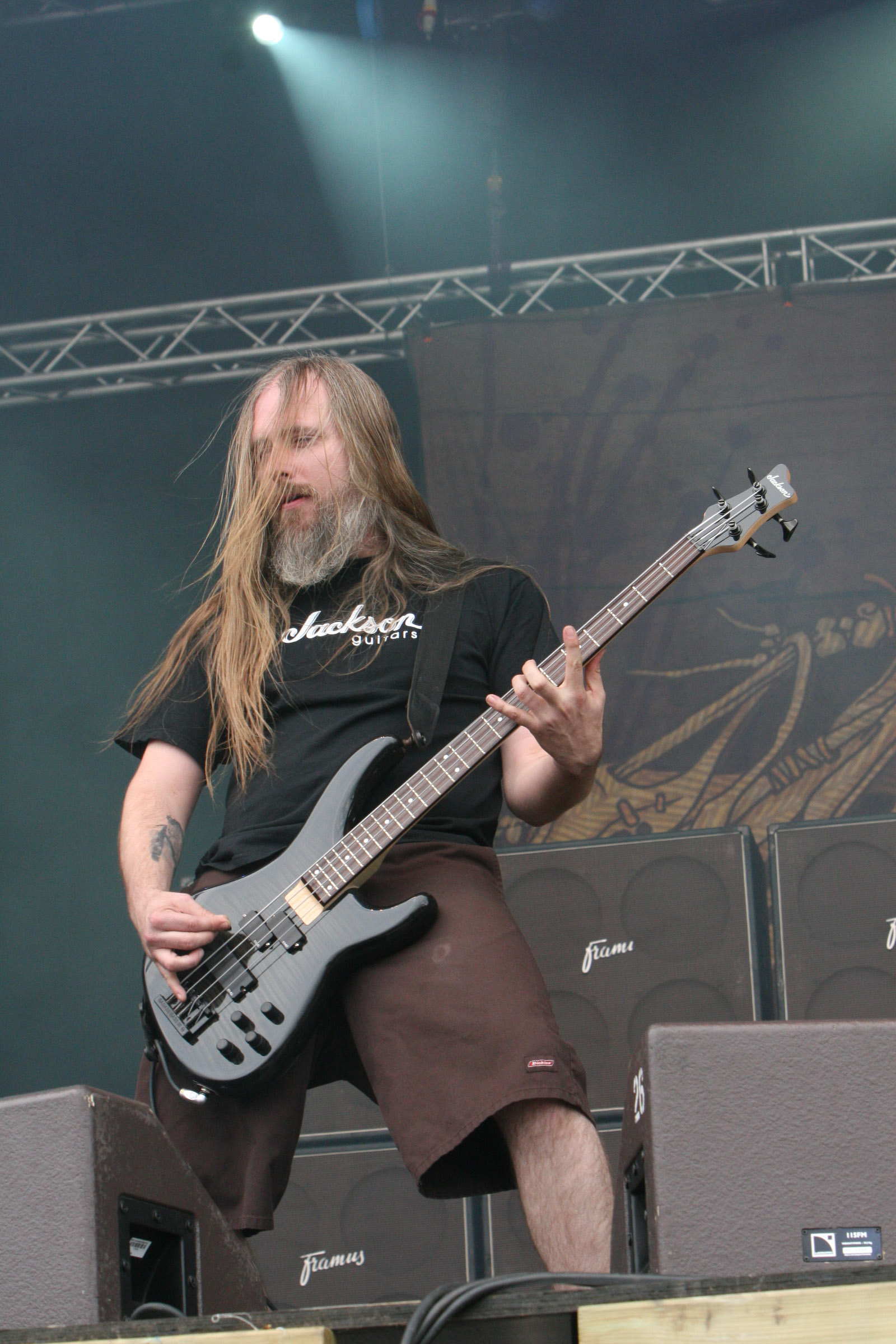
Bassist John Campbell performing at With Full Force 2007

After touring extensively in 2004 and 2005 for their album Ashes of the Wake, Lamb of God took some time off in late 2005, early 2006 to write material for their new record. In June and July 2006, Lamb of God took some time out of the studio to perform in Mastodon, Children of Bodom, and Thine Eyes Bleed. After the tour, the band went back into the studio to complete their new album.

In August 2006 Lamb of God released its fifth studio album, Sacrament. The album debuted at number eight on the Billboard 200 and sold nearly 65,000 copies in its first week of sales, nearly doubling the first week sales of Ashes of the Wake. The album received generally positive reviews, with Cosmo Lee of Stylus Magazine stating, "Sacrament has the band's most memorable songs to date. Musically, there's no fat. The band plays with laser precision and songs move smoothly through riffs and transitions." Ed Thompson of IGN referred to Sacrament "one of the best metal albums of 2006", and Jon Pareles of Blender called it a "speed rush all the way through". After the release, Lamb of God took part in the 2006 Gigantour, supporting Megadeth, then continued to tour in Japan, Australia, Europe (as part of The Unholy Alliance European Tour.

In 2007, the band did a headlining tour of the United States and Canada and then returned to Australia and Japan for a "headlining" tour. This tour also took them to Auckland, New Zealand for the first time. The band went on to play major European Festivals in the summer including Rock am Ring and Rock im Park and Download Festival. Lamb of God returned home in July to co-headline Ozzfest with Ozzy Osbourne. The band went on to play in England and Scotland supporting Heaven and Hell and then back the US for a headlining tour.

== Walk with Me In Hell DVD ==
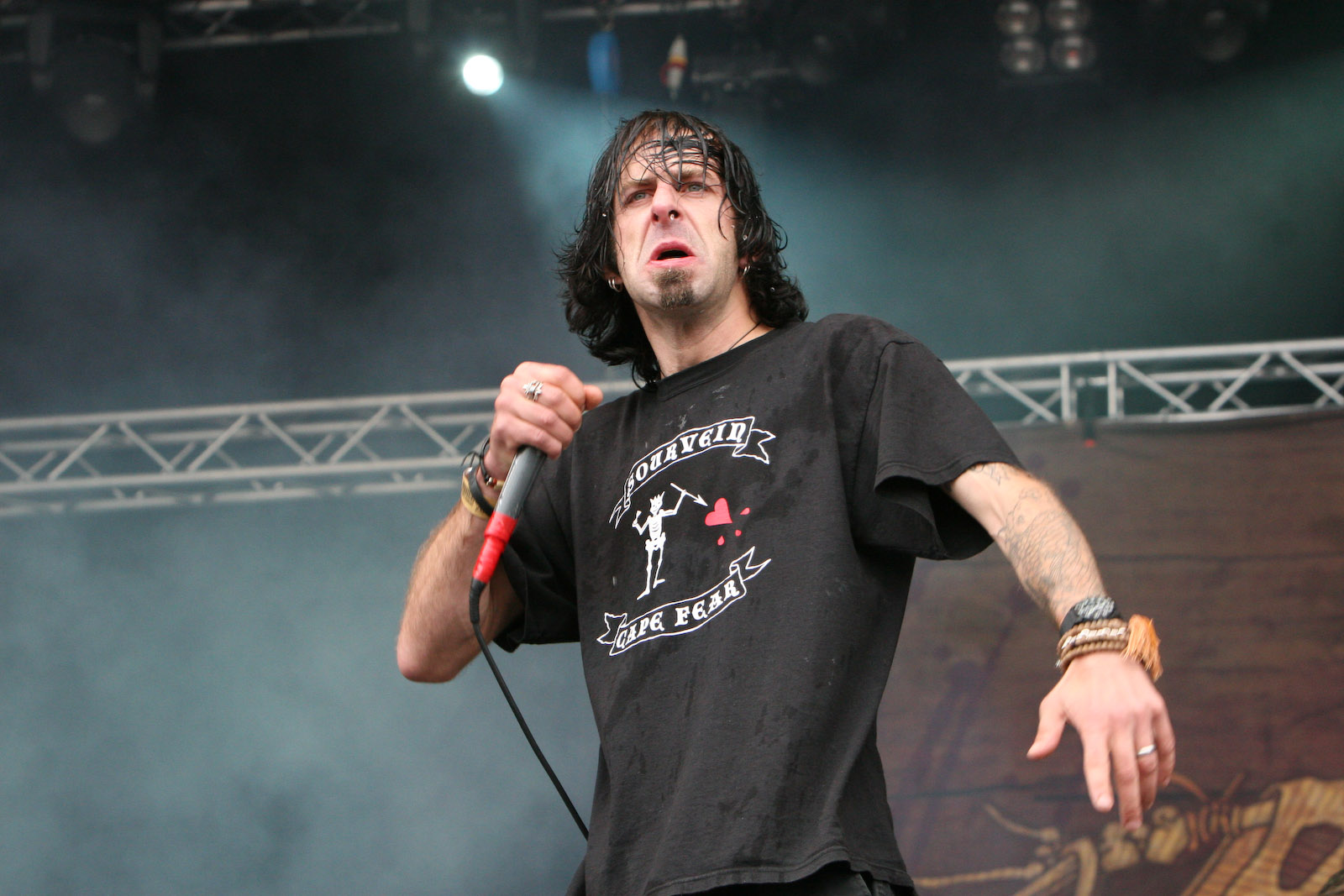
Randy Blythe at With Full Force 2007

On July 1, 2008, Lamb of God released their new DVD; Walk with Me in Hell. The DVD is a double-disc and has nearly five hours of footage. It contains the feature documentary Walk with Me in Hell and multiple live performance extras from across the globe on the Sacrament World Tour. As well as the additional full-length feature "Making of Sacrament" plus Lamb of God's entire performance at the 2007 Download Festival, where they performed in front of over 72,000 fans. Extras include deleted scenes, live performance videos for various tour stops, the official music video for "Redneck", and a "Making of ‘Redneck’" documentary.

== Typical setlist ==
- Taken from show at Hammerstein Ballroom in New York City on November 30, 2007.
  - Hourglass
  - Again We Rise
  - Walk With Me In Hell
  - Ruin
  - Pathetic
  - As The Palaces Burn
  - Descending
  - More Time To Kill
  - Blacken The Cursed Sun
  - Bloodletting
  - 11th Hour
  - Now You've Got Something To Die For
  - What I've Become
  - Laid To Rest
  - Vigil
  - Redneck
  - Black Label

== Tour dates ==
Date	City	Country	Venue
North American leg I – The Unholy Alliance Tour
June 15, 2006	Camden	United States	Tweeter Center
June 16, 2006	East Rutherford	United States	Continental Airlines Arena
June 17, 2006	Lowell	United States	Tsongas Arena
June 19, 2006	Cincinnati	United States	U.S. Bank Arena
June 20, 2006	Chicago	United States	Aragon Ballroom
June 21, 2006	St. Louis	United States	Pop's Outside
June 23, 2006	San Antonio	United States	Freeman Coliseum
June 24, 2006	Grand Prairie	United States	Nokia Theatre
June 25, 2006	Houston	United States	Reliant Arena
June 27, 2006	Atlanta	United States	Hi-Fi Buys Amphitheatre
June 29, 2006	Albany	United States	Washington Avenue Armory
June 30, 2006	Cleveland	United States	Tower City Amphitheatre
July 2, 2006	Quebec City	Canada	Colisée Pepsi
July 3, 2006	Montreal	Canada	Bell Centre
July 4, 2006	Toronto	Canada	Molson Amphitheatre
July 6, 2006	Detroit	United States	Cobo Arena
July 7, 2006	Milwaukee	United States	Eagles Ballroom
July 8, 2006	Saint Paul	United States	Roy Wilkins Auditorium
July 9, 2006	Winnipeg	Canada	MTS Centre
July 11, 2006	Edmonton	Canada	Shaw Conference Center
July 13, 2006	Vancouver	Canada	GM Place
July 14, 2006	Seattle	United States	Qwest Field Event Center
July 15, 2006	Eugene	United States	McDonald Theater
July 16, 2006	Spokane	United States	Star Theatre
July 19, 2006	San Jose	United States	HP Pavilion at San Jose
July 20, 2006	San Diego	United States	San Diego Sports Arena
July 21, 2006	Mesa	United States	Mesa Amphitheatre
July 22, 2006	Long Beach	United States	Long Beach Arena
July 24, 2006	Paradise	United States	Orleans Arena
July 26, 2006	Denver	United States	Fillmore Auditorium
North American leg II – Gigantour
September 6, 2006	Nampa	United States	Idaho Center
September 8, 2006	Oakland	United States	Oakland Coliseum
September 9, 2006	San Diego	United States	Cox Arena
September 10, 2006	San Bernardino	United States	Hyundai Pavilion
September 12, 2006	Las Vegas	United States	House of Blues
September 13, 2006	Phoenix	United States	Dodge Theatre
September 15, 2006	West Valley City	United States	E Center
September 16, 2006	Greenwood Village	United States	Coors Amphitheatre
September 17, 2006	Albuquerque	United States	Journal Pavilion
September 19, 2006	Oklahoma City	United States	Zoo Amphitheatre
September 21, 2006	Milwaukee	United States	Eagles Ballroom
September 22, 2006	Chicago	United States	Congress Theater
September 23, 2006	Columbus	United States	Nationwide Arena
September 24, 2006	Clarkston	United States	DTE Energy Music Theatre
September 25, 2006	Toronto	Canada	Molson Amphitheatre
September 27, 2006	Montreal	Canada	Bell Centre
September 28, 2006	Uniondale	United States	Nassau Coliseum
September 29, 2006	Boston	United States	Bank of America Pavilion
September 30, 2006	Holmdel Township	United States	PNC Bank Arts Center
October 1, 2006	Atlantic City	United States	House of Blues
October 3, 2006	Portsmouth	United States	Ntelos Pavilion Harbor Center
October 4, 2006	Charleston	United States	The Plex
October 6, 2006	Tampa	United States	St. Pete Times Forum
October 7, 2006	Sunrise	United States	BankAtlantic Center
October 8, 2006	Orlando	United States	Hard Rock Live
Japan/Australian leg I
October 15, 2006	Tokyo	Japan	Loudpark Festival
Supporting: Killswitch Engage with Unearth and I Killed the Prom Queen
October 17, 2006	Brisbane	Australia	The Arena
October 18, 2006	Sydney	Australia	Big Top Luna Park
October 19, 2006	Melbourne	Australia	The Palace
October 20, 2006	Perth	Australia	Capitol
European leg I – The Unholy Alliance Tour
October 22, 2006	Milan	Italy	Mazda Palace
October 23, 2006	Winterthur	Switzerland	Eulachhalle
October 25, 2006	Düsseldorf	Germany	Philipshalle
October 26, 2006	Erfurt	Germany	Thuringenhalle
October 27, 2006	Munich	Germany	Zenith
October 28, 2006	Stuttgart	Germany	Sporthalle
October 30, 2006	Cardiff	Wales	Cardiff Arena
November 1, 2006	Birmingham	England	NEC
November 2, 2006	Glasgow	Scotland	SECC
November 3, 2006	Manchester	England	MEN Arena
November 5, 2006	Dublin	Point Theatre	
November 7, 2006	Paris	France	Bercy
November 8, 2006	Trier	Germany	Messe Park
November 9, 2006	Leuven	Belgium	Brabanthal
November 12, 2006	Helsinki	Finland	Jahalli
November 13, 2006	Tampere	Finland	Jahalli
November 15, 2006	Oslo	Norway	Spektrum
November 16, 2006	Stockholm	Sweden	Hovet
November 19, 2006	London	England	Brixton Academy
November 20, 2006	London	England	Brixton Academy
North American leg IV Supported by: Trivium, Machine Head and Gojira
February 16, 2007	Dallas	United States	The Palladium
February 17, 2007	Corpus Christi	United States	Concrete St. Amphitheatre
February 18, 2007	Austin	United States	Stubbs
February 20, 2007	Albuquerque	United States	Sunshine Theatre
February 22, 2007	Anaheim	United States	The Grove
February 23, 2007	Fresno	United States	Rainbow Ballroom
February 23, 2007	Santa Cruz	United States	The Catalyst
February 25, 2007	Los Angeles	United States	Wiltern Theatre
February 27, 2007	Chico	United States	The Senator Theatre
February 28, 2007	Portland	United States	Roseland Theatre
March 1, 2007	Spokane	United States	Big Easy
March 3, 2007	Edmonton	Canada	Ed's – The Venue
March 4, 2007	Calgary	Canada	Macewan Hall
March 6, 2007	Winnipeg	Canada	Burton Cummings Theatre
March 7, 2007	Frago	United States	Playmakers Pavilion
March 8, 2007	Omaha	United States	Sokol Auditorium
March 9, 2007	Tulsa	United States	Cains Ballroom
March 10, 2007	Kansas City	United States	Beaumont Club
March 11, 2007	Sioux Falls	United States	Empire Expo Hall
March 13, 2007	Cedar Rapids	United States	Hawkeye Downs
March 14, 2007	Milwaukee	United States	Eagles Ballroom
March 15, 2007	Fort Wayne	United States	Pierres
March 16, 2007	Toledo	United States	Headliners
March 17, 2007	Grand Rapids	United States	Orbit Room
March 18, 2007	Guelph	Canada	Cowboys Bar
March 20, 2007	Montreal	Canada	Medley
March 21, 2007	Providence	United States	Lupo's Heartbreak Hotel
March 22, 2007	New York City	United States	Roseland Ballroom
March 23, 2007	Atlantic City	United States	House of Blues
March 24, 2007	Albany	United States	Northern Lights
March 25, 2007	Rochester	United States	Harro East
March 26, 2007	Washington, D.C.	United States	9:30 Club
March 28, 2007	Norfolk	United States	Norva Theatre
March 29, 2007	Myrtle Beach	United States	House of Blues
March 30, 2007	Jacksonville	United States	Plush
March 31, 2007	St. Petersburg	United States	Jannus Landing
April 1, 2007	Fort Lauderdale	United States	Revolution
April 3, 2007	Nashville	United States	City Hall
April 4, 2007	Memphis	United States	The New Daisy Theatre
April 5, 2007	Cincinnati	United States	Bogart's
Australian/Japan leg II
Supported by: Subtract
April 25, 2007	Auckland	New Zealand	Powerstation
Supported by: Sydonia
April 27, 2007	Melbourne	Australia	The Palace
April 28, 2007	Brisbane	Australia	The Arena
April 29, 2007	Sydney	Australia	Roundhouse
April 30, 2007	Adelaide	Australia	HQ
May 1, 2007	Perth	Australia	Metropolis
Supported by: The Sword
May 5, 2007	Nagoya	Japan	Club Quattro
May 6, 2007	Osaka	Japan	Club Quattro
May 7, 2007	Tokyo	Japan	Club Quattro
European leg II Support acts on selected Headlining dates: Chimaira, As I Lay Dying, Unearth, DevilDriver, In This Moment, End of Everything and Criminal
June 2, 2007	Nürburgring	Germany	Rock am Ring
June 3, 2007	Nuremberg	Germany	Rock im Park
June 4, 2007	Brussels	Belgium	Ancienne Belgique *
June 5, 2007	Northampton England	Soundhaus *	
June 6, 2007	Edinburgh	Scotland	Liquid Rooms *
June 7, 2007	Glasgow	Scotland	Carling Academy *
June 9, 2007	Sheffield	England	Corporation *
June 10, 2007	Donington Park	England	Download Festival
June 11, 2007	London	England	Metal Hammer Golden Gods Awards
June 12, 2007	Colchester	England	Arts Centre *
June 13, 2007	Hellendoorn	Netherlands	Lantaarn *
June 15, 2007	Hultsfred	Sweden	Hultsfred Festival
June 17, 2007	Seinajoki	Finland	Provinssirock
June 20, 2007	Berlin	Germany	SO36 *
June 21, 2007	Tilburg	Netherlands	013 *
June 22, 2007	Clisson	France	Hellfest
June 23, 2007	Dessel	Belgium	Graspop Metal Meeting
June 25, 2007	Hamburg	Germany	Grunspan *
June 27, 2007	Arendal	Norway	Hovefestivalen
June 28, 2007	Copenhagen	Denmark	Pumpehuset *
June 29, 2007	Twistringen	Germany	Reload Festival
June 30, 2007	Leipzig	Germany	With Full Force
North American leg V – Ozzfest Support acts on Headlining dates: Hatebreed, 3 Inches of Blood and Behemoth
July 12, 2007	Auburn	United States	White River Amphitheatre
July 13, 2007	Vancouver	Canada	Croatian Cultural Center *
July 14, 2007	George	United States	The Gorge Amphitheatre
July 15, 2007	Eugene	United States	McDonald Theatre *
July 16, 2007	Sparks	United States	New Oasis *
July 17, 2007	Wheatland	United States	Sleep Train Amphitheatre
July 19, 2007	Mountain View	United States	Shoreline Amphitheatre
July 19, 2007	Bakersfield	United States	Stramler Park *
July 21, 2007	San Bernardino	United States	Hyundai Pavilion
July 22, 2007	San Diego	United States	Soma San Diego *
July 23, 2007	Las Vegas	United States	House of Blues *
July 24, 2007	Phoenix	United States	Cricket Wireless Pavilion
July 26, 2007	Albuquerque	United States	Journal Pavilion
July 27, 2007	Boulder	United States	Boulder Theatre *
July 28, 2007	Greenwood Village	United States	Coors Amphitheatre
July 29, 2007	Wichita	United States	The Cotillion *
July 30, 2007	Maryland Heights	United States	Verizon Wireless Amphitheatre
August 1, 2007	Houston	United States	Verizon Wireless Theater
August 2, 2007	Selma	United States	Verizon Wireless Amphitheatre
August 3, 2007	Lubbock	United States	Lonestar Events Center *
August 4, 2007	Dallas	United States	Smirnoff Music Centre
August 5, 2007	Dallas	United States	Clear Channel Metroplex *
August 6, 2007	Maryland Heights	United States	UMB Bank Pavilion
August 8, 2007	Columbus	United States	Germain Amphitheater
August 10, 2007	Tinley Park	United States	First Midwest Bank Amphitheatre
August 11, 2007	Louisville	United States	Waverly Hills Sanatorium **
August 12, 2007	East Troy	United States	Alpine Valley Music Theatre
August 13, 2007	Cleveland	United States	Agora Theatre *
August 14, 2007	Noblesville	United States	Verizon Wireless Music Center
August 16, 2007	Holmdel Township	United States	PNC Bank Arts Center
August 17, 2007	Buffalo	United States	Town Ballroom *
August 18, 2007	Hartford	United States	New England Dodge Music Center
August 19, 2007	Johnson City	United States	Magic City Music Hall *
August 20, 2007	Mansfield	United States	Tweeter Center
August 22, 2007	Camden	United States	Tweeter Center
August 23, 2007	Baltimore	United States	Rams Head Live! *
August 24, 2007	Burgettstown	United States	Post-Gazette Pavilion
August 25, 2007	Toronto	Canada	Kool Haus *
August 26, 2007	Clarkston	United States	DTE Energy Music Theatre
August 28, 2007	Charlotte	United States	Verizon Wireless Amphitheatre
August 29, 2007	Atlanta	United States	The Tabernacle *
August 30, 2007	West Palm Beach	United States	Sound Advice Amphitheatre
August 31, 2007	Lake Buena Vista	United States	House of Blues *
September 1, 2007	North Charleston	United States	The Plex *
September 2, 2007	Richmond	United States	Toad's Place *
European leg III Supporting: Heaven and Hell with Iced Earth
November 4, 2007	Newcastle	England	Metro Radio Arena
November 6, 2007	Glasgow	Scotland	SECC
November 7, 2007	Sheffield	England	Hallam FM Arena
November 9, 2007	Manchester	England	MEN Arena
November 10, 2007	London	England	Wembley Arena
November 11, 2007	Brighton	England	Brighton Centre
November 13, 2007	Birmingham	England	National Exhibition Centre
November 14, 2007	Cardiff	Wales	Cardiff International Arena
November 15, 2007	Nottingham	England	Nottingham Arena
November 17, 2007	Plymouth	England	Plymouth Pavilions
November 18, 2007	Bournemouth	England	Bournemouth International Centre
North American leg VI Supported by: Killswitch Engage, DevilDriver and Soilwork
November 28, 2007	Lowell	United States	Tsongas Arena
November 29, 2007	Reading	United States	Reading Eagle Theatre
November 30, 2007	New York City	United States	Hammerstein Ballroom
December 1, 2007	Lewiston	United States	Androscoggin Bank Colisée
December 2, 2007	Albany	United States	Washington Ave. Armory
December 4, 2007	Detroit	United States	The Fillmore Detroit
December 5, 2007	Chicago	United States	Congress Theater
December 7, 2007	Kansas City	United States	Memorial Hall
December 8, 2007	Grand Prairie	United States	Nokia Theatre at Grand Prairie
December 9, 2007	Corpus Christi	United States	Concrete St. Amphitheatre
December 10, 2007	Houston	United States	Verizon Wireless Theater
December 12, 2007	Denver	United States	Fillmore Auditorium
December 13, 2007	Salt Lake City	United States	SaltAir Pavilion
December 14, 2007	Reno	United States	Grand Sierra Theatre
December 15, 2007	Long Beach	United States	Long Beach Arena
December 16, 2007	Phoenix	United States	Dodge Theatre
December 17, 2007	Albuquerque	United States	Santa Ana Star Center

* Lamb of God Headlining Shows
** Headlined the final show of the 2007 Sounds Of The Underground Tour
