= Walk with Me in Hell =

Video by Lamb of God
- Released: July 1, 2008
- Genre: Groove metal
- Length: 240:31
- Label: Epic/Roadrunner
- Director: Doug Spangenberg
- Producers: Space Monkey Studios, Inc.

Lamb of God chronology
Killadelphia (2005)	Walk with Me in Hell (2008)

Professional ratings
Review scores
Source	Rating
Allmusic	3.5/5 stars
Blabbermouth.net	9/10
Kerrang!	4/5 stars

Walk with Me in Hell is the third video album by American heavy metal band Lamb of God. On May 1, 2008, Lamb of God stated via Myspace that their new live DVD, Walk with Me in Hell, would be released on July 1, 2008. The DVD is two discs long and has nearly five hours of footage. It contains the feature documentary Walk with Me in Hell and multiple live performance extras from across the globe on the Sacrament World Tour as well as the additional full-length feature “Making of Sacrament” plus Lamb of God's entire performance at the Download Festival 2007, where they performed in front of over 72,000 fans. Extras include deleted scenes, live performance videos for various tour stops, the official music video for “Redneck,” and a “Making of ‘Redneck’” documentary. The video peaked at #2 on the Billboard Top Music Video chart, and was certified platinum by the RIAA for 100,000 copies sold in 2009.

The films world premiere took place at Chelsea Cinemas in New York City on June 30, with the full band in attendance.

The DVD received positive reception and was ranked the second best metal DVD of the decade by MTV’s Headbangers Ball.

== Track listing ==
All songs written and composed by Lamb of God.

=== Disc one ===
Documentary

1. "Setup to Fail" (The Unholy Alliance tour)
2. "Playing the Game" (Sacrament release day)
3. "The Be All, End All" (Megadeth tour)
4. "A One Eighty Shift" (Japan)
5. "Speed Boats and Koalas" (Australia)
6. "It's a Travesty" (The Unholy Alliance Europe)
7. "Summon the Devil" (Conan & The Grammies)
8. "Better Than Nascar" (US Headline tour)
9. "They Got a Bar Here?" (Return to Australia)
10. "As Foreign as It Gets" (Return to Japan)
11. "Payoff?" (European festivals)
12. "Big Shoes to Fill" (Ozzfest)
13. "Crickets" (Heaven and Hell UK)
14. "Time Served" (Arena Headline tour)

Live

1. "Redneck" (from the Unholy Alliance US)
2. "Again We Rise" (from the Megadeth tour)
3. "Walk with Me in Hell" (from the Unholy Alliance Europe)
4. "Now You've Got Something to Die For" (from European festivals)
5. "Blacken the Cursed Sun" (from Ozzfest)
6. "Pathetic" (from the Arena Headline tour)

=== Disc two ===
- The Making of Sacrament

Complete Download Festival Performance

- note that the DVD says it is the "complete uncut performance" when, in fact, they do cut out parts in between songs*
1. "Laid to Rest"
2. "Again We Rise"
3. "Walk with Me in Hell"
4. "Pathetic"
5. "Now You've Got Something to Die For"
6. "Blacken the Cursed Sun"
7. "Redneck"
8. "Black Label"

Deleted Scenes

- Japan
- Australia
- United States
- Europe
- "Redneck" music video
- Behind the scenes of the "Redneck" music video shoot

There has been some confusion amongst UK fans, as UK pressings of the DVD do not seem to contain the deleted scenes. So far, no word as to why this is has been made by the band or anyone in association with the band.

== Personnel ==
- Randy Blythe – vocals
- Mark Morton – lead guitar
- Willie Adler – rhythm guitar
- John Campbell – bass
- Chris Adler – drums

== Certification ==
Region	Certification	Certified units/sales
Canada (Music Canada)	Gold	5,000^{^}
United States (RIAA)	Platinum	100,000^{^}
