= Pathetic =

Pathetic may refer to:

- Pathos, the rhetorical appeal to emotion
- The pathetic fallacy, an over-personification of inanimate objects
- "Pathetic", a song by Blink-182 from their 1997 album Dude Ranch
- "Pathetic", a song by Lamb of God from their 2006 album Sacrament
