= South African heavy metal =

South African heavy metal has its roots in South African hard rock and heavy metal bands in the 1980s. Through the late 1980s and the early 1990s South Africa grew a well supported metal scene. Particular scenes developed in Cape Town, Johannesburg and Pretoria. South African heavy metal has been particularly influenced by foreign bands, particularly the New Wave of American heavy metal and American thrash metal.

== History ==
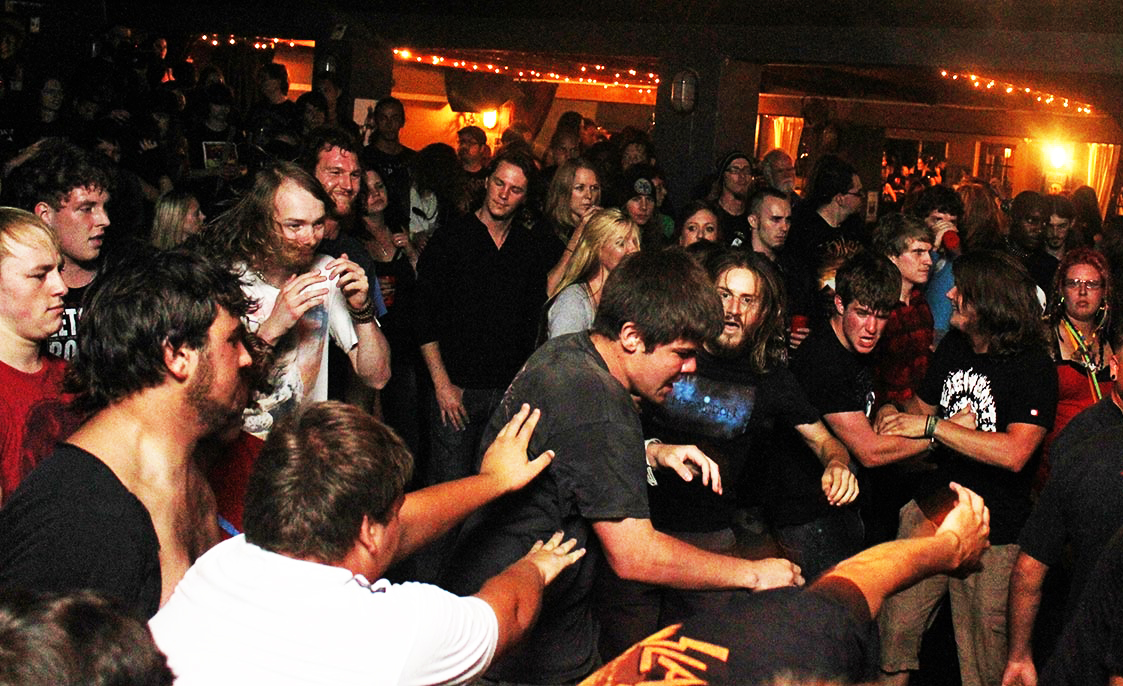
Metal4Africa Summerfest 2013 crowd

In the 1990s there developed extreme metal scenes with grindcore and death metal acts, there was a devout following nationally, which attracted international artists to tour the country. In the mid 1990s two South African bands, Voice of Destruction and Groinchurn signed to the German label Morbid Records.

South African bands play a variety of different genres, including thrash metal, black metal, speed metal and metalcore.

Mind Assault was formed in 2003, and were the first extreme metal band to use their native language Afrikaans in their music.

Famous metal acts that have played in South Africa includes, Lamb of God, Trivium, Sepultura, Kataklysm, Behemoth, Hatebreed, Cannibal Corpse, Napalm Death, Iron Maiden and Metallica.

In Cape Town there is a well attended bi-annual metal showcase from Metal4Africa.
