= Stigma (Mind Assault album) =

Studio album by Mind Assault
- Released: 2 February 2008
- Genre: Melodic death metal
- Length: 58:07
- Label: Subterania

Stigma is the first full-length album by the South African metal band Mind Assault. Stigma was released in February 2008. The album has received largely positive reviews.

== Track listing ==
1. My Donker
2. Prison Of Flesh
3. Innocent Blood
4. Paint My Mind Black
5. Hoekom
6. Suffer
7. Tranquil Thoughts
8. Rise Once Again
9. Veroordeel
10. Stadig Verblind
11. We Will Prevail
12. This Is The End
13. Revenge

== Reviews ==
- Lords Of Metal

== Band members ==
- Jacques Fourie - Vocals
- Francois Pretorius - Guitar
- Patrick Davidson - Guitar
- Donovan Tose - Bass
- Andries Smit - Drums

== Credits ==
- Mix and Master: Jarod Gunston
- Engineer: Theunis Cilliers
- Artwork: Brendon Thomas
