= Wrath Tour =

2008–10 concert tour by Lamb of God

- Tour by Lamb of God
- Promotional poster advertising the Lamb of God concert held in Auckland in December 2009
- Location: Asia; Europe; North America; Oceania; South America
- Associated album: Wrath
- Start date: November 24, 2008
- End date: November 21, 2010
- Legs: 15
- No. of shows: 275; 137 in North America; 84 in Europe; 29 in Oceania; 15 in Asia; 6 in South America; 6 cancellations

Lamb of God concert chronology
- Sacrament Tour (2006–07); Wrath Tour (2008–10); Resolution Tour (2012–14)

Wrath Tour was a concert tour by American heavy metal band Lamb of God in support of the group's sixth studio album, Wrath, which was released in February 2009.

The tour began in November 2008 with a headline date in the band's hometown of Richmond, Virginia. The following month, the band toured North America as the main support act to Metallica on their World Magnetic Tour. The group met controversy when they were banned from playing at The Forum in Inglewood, California, where Metallica were booked for two dates. Faithful Central Bible Church, the owners of The Forum, refused to let the group perform after they had learned the band formerly went by the name "Burn the Priest". This was the second occasion Lamb of God ran into a dispute with the venue; the group were previously banned from performing in 2005 while supporting Slipknot on their Subliminal Verses Tour. The group announced shows in outlying cities in lieu of the ban.

In February 2009, the band toured Europe; a number of the U.K. dates were part of a package tour sponsored by Metal Hammer dubbed "Defenders of the Faith" featuring Dimmu Borgir as co-headliners. The group then toured Australia through March as part of the Soundwave Festival, which was headlined by Nine Inch Nails and Alice in Chains. In April 2009, the group began a headlining North American tour, sponsored by No Fear Energy. The leg began in Phoenix, Arizona and wrapped up mid-May in North Myrtle Beach, South Carolina. In July 2009, during a European summer tour, guitarist Mark Morton exited the tour prior to the final six dates as he and his wife were expecting their first child. Morton was replaced by Buz McGrath of Unearth for the remaining summer dates, and Doc Coyle of God Forbid for the first three weeks of a fall North American leg. Morton eventually rejoined the group in October in Tampa, Florida.

The show in Prague at Abaton on May 24, 2010, was the subject of manslaughter charges against vocalist Randy Blythe in 2012 and 2013. The court eventually ruled that Blythe was not criminally liable and acquitted him on March 5, 2013.

== Tour dates ==
Date	City	Country	Venue/Event
North America
November 24, 2008	Richmond	United States	The National
December 1, 2008^{[1]}	Seattle	United States	KeyArena
December 2, 2008^{[1]}	Vancouver	Canada	General Motors Place
December 4, 2008^{[1]}	Calgary	Canada	Pengrowth Saddledome
December 5, 2008^{[1]}	Calgary	Canada	Pengrowth Saddledome
December 6, 2008	Saskatoon	Canada	Prairieland Exhibition Hall
December 7, 2008^{[1]}	Edmonton	Canada	Rexall Place
December 9, 2008	Spokane	United States	Knitting Factory Concert House
December 10, 2008	Portland	United States	Roseland Theater
December 11, 2008	Chico	United States	Senator Theatre
December 12, 2008^{[1]}	Ontario	United States	Citizens Business Bank Arena
December 13, 2008^{[1]}	Fresno	United States	Save Mart Center
December 15, 2008^{[1]}	San Diego	United States	Cox Arena
December 16, 2008	Anaheim	United States	The Grove
December 17, 2008	Tucson	United States	Rialto Theatre
December 18, 2008	Las Vegas	United States	House of Blues
December 19, 2008	Ventura	United States	Ventura Majestic Theatre
December 20, 2008^{[1]}	Oakland	United States	Oracle Arena
Europe
February 6, 2009	Lahti	Finland	Frostbite Metalfest
February 8, 2009	Belfast	United Kingdom	Mandela Hall
February 9, 2009	Dublin	Ireland	The Academy
February 11, 2009^{[2]}	Bristol	United Kingdom	O_{2} Academy Bristol
February 12, 2009^{[2]}	Birmingham	United Kingdom	O_{2} Academy Birmingham
February 13, 2009^{[2]}	Manchester	United Kingdom	Manchester Academy
February 14, 2009^{[2]}	London	United Kingdom	O_{2} Academy Brixton
February 15, 2009^{[2]}	Glasgow	United Kingdom	O_{2} Academy Glasgow
February 17, 2009	Sheffield	United Kingdom	Corporation
Australia ("Soundwave Festival")
February 21, 2009	Brisbane	Australia	Brisbane Exhibition Ground
February 22, 2009	Sydney	Australia	Eastern Creek Raceway
February 23, 2009^{[3]}	Sydney	Australia	The Forum
February 24, 2009^{[3]}	Melbourne	Australia	Billboard The Venue
February 27, 2009	Melbourne	Australia	Royal Melbourne Showgrounds
February 28, 2009	Adelaide	Australia	Bonython Park
March 2, 2009	Perth	Australia	Steel Blue Oval
Asia
March 4, 2009^{[4]}	Tokyo	Japan	Akasaka Blitz
March 5, 2009^{[4]}	Tokyo	Japan	Akasaka Blitz
March 6, 2009^{[4]}	Osaka	Japan	Namba Hatch
March 9, 2009	Jakarta	Indonesia	Tennis Indoor Senayan
North America ("No Fear Energy Music Tour")
April 2, 2009	Phoenix	United States	Dodge Theater
April 3, 2009	Los Angeles	United States	Hollywood Palladium
April 4, 2009	San Jose	United States	Event Center Arena
April 5, 2009	Fresno	United States	Crest Theater
April 7, 2009	Seattle	United States	Paramount Theatre
April 8, 2009	Vancouver	Canada	UBC Thunderbird Arena
April 10, 2009	Edmonton	Canada	Shaw Conference Centre
April 11, 2009	Calgary	Canada	Stampede Corral
April 12, 2009	Saskatoon	Canada	Prairieland Exhibition Hall
April 13, 2009	Winnipeg	Canada	Winnipeg Convention Centre
April 14, 2009	Thunder Bay	Canada	Thunder Bay Community Auditorium
April 16, 2009	Toronto	Canada	Ricoh Coliseum
April 17, 2009	Montreal	Canada	CEPSUM
April 18, 2009	Worcester	United States	New England Metal and Hardcore Festival
April 19, 2009	Philadelphia	United States	Electric Factory
April 21, 2009	Columbus	United States	Lifestyle Communities Pavilion
April 22, 2009	Atlanta	United States	The Tabernacle
April 23, 2009	Lafayette	United States	Blackham Coliseum
April 24, 2009	Houston	United States	Verizon Wireless Theater
April 25, 2009	Corpus Christi	United States	Concrete Street Amphitheater
April 26, 2009	Dallas	United States	Palladium Ballroom
April 28, 2009	Denver	United States	Fillmore Auditorium
April 29, 2009	Kansas City	United States	Uptown Theater
April 30, 2009	Minneapolis	United States	Myth
May 1, 2009	Chicago	United States	Congress Theater
May 2, 2009	St. Louis	United States	The Pageant
May 3, 2009	Indianapolis	United States	Murat Centre
May 5, 2009	Louisville	United States	Expo Five
May 6, 2009	Detroit	United States	The Fillmore Detroit
May 8, 2009	New York City	United States	Roseland Ballroom
May 9, 2009	Philadelphia	United States	Electric Factory
May 11, 2009	Baltimore	United States	Rams Head Live!
May 12, 2009	Boston	United States	House of Blues
May 13, 2009	Albany	United States	Washington Avenue Armory
May 15, 2009	North Myrtle Beach	United States	House of Blues
Europe
June 14, 2009^{[1]}	Helsinki	Finland	Hartwall Arena
June 15, 2009^{[1]}	Helsinki	Finland	Hartwall Arena
June 17, 2009^{[1]}	Oslo	Norway	Oslo Spektrum
June 19, 2009	Vosselaar	Belgium	Biebob
June 20, 2009	Nijmegen	Netherlands	Sonisphere Festival
June 22, 2009^{[1]}	Milan	Italy	Mediolanum Forum
June 23, 2009	Rimini	Italy	Velvet
June 24, 2009^{[1]}	Rome	Italy	PalaLottomatica
June 26, 2009	Hohenems	Austria	Tennis Event Center
June 28, 2009	Dessel	Belgium	Graspop Metal Meeting
June 29, 2009	Munich	Germany	Backstage
June 30, 2009	Paris	France	Le Trabendo
July 1, 2009	Luxembourg	Luxembourg	Den Atelier
July 3, 2009	Lucerne	Switzerland	Konzerthaus
July 4, 2009	Hockenheim	Germany	Sonisphere Festival
July 5, 2009	Tolmin	Slovenia	Metalcamp
July 7, 2009	Lyon	France	Le Ninkasi Kao
July 9, 2009	Lisbon	Portugal	Optimus Alive!
July 11, 2009	Barcelona	Spain	Sonisphere Festival
July 13, 2009^{[1]}	Madrid	Spain	Palacio de Deportes
July 14, 2009^{[1]}	Madrid	Spain	Palacio de Deportes
July 16, 2009^{[1]}	Zürich	Switzerland	Hallenstadion
July 18, 2009	Hultsfred	Sweden	Sonisphere Festival
July 20, 2009^{[1]}	Copenhagen	Denmark	Forum Copenhagen
July 22, 2009^{[1]}	Copenhagen	Denmark	Forum Copenhagen
July 23, 2009^{[1]}	Copenhagen	Denmark	Forum Copenhagen
July 25, 2009	Pori	Finland	Sonisphere Festival
July 27, 2009^{[1]}	Copenhagen	Denmark	Forum
July 28, 2009^{[1]}	Copenhagen	Denmark	Forum
July 30, 2009^{[1]}	Oslo	Norway	Spektrum
August 1, 2009	Amsterdam	Netherlands	Melkweg
August 2, 2009	Knebworth	United Kingdom	Sonisphere Festival
North America
September 14, 2009^{[1]}	Nashville	United States	Sommet Center
September 15, 2009^{[1]}	Cincinnati	United States	U.S. Bank Arena
September 17, 2009^{[1]}	Indianapolis	United States	Conseco Fieldhouse
September 19, 2009^{[1]}	Montreal	Canada	Bell Centre
September 20, 2009^{[1]}	Montreal	Canada	Bell Centre
September 21, 2009	Providence	United States	Lupo's Heartbreak Hotel
September 22, 2009	Montclair	United States	Wellmont Theatre
September 23, 2009	Pittsburgh	United States	Amphitheatre at Station Square
September 25, 2009	Oklahoma City	United States	Bricktown Events Center
September 26, 2009	Lubbock	United States	Lonestar Amphitheatre
September 27, 2009	Austin	United States	Austin Music Hall
September 28, 2009^{[1]}	San Antonio	United States	AT&T Center
September 29, 2009^{[1]}	Dallas	United States	American Airlines Center
October 1, 2009^{[1]}	Sunrise	United States	BankAtlantic Center
October 2, 2009	Jacksonville	United States	Plush
October 3, 2009^{[1]}	Tampa	United States	St. Pete Times Forum
October 4, 2009^{[1]}	Atlanta	United States	Philips Arena
October 5, 2009	Orlando	United States	Hard Rock Live
October 7, 2009	Little Rock	United States	Metroplex Event Center
October 8, 2009	Wichita	United States	The Cotillion
October 9, 2009	West Des Moines	United States	Val Air Ballroom
October 10, 2009	Fargo	United States	The Venue @ Playmaker's
October 12, 2009^{[1]}	Winnipeg	Canada	MTS Centre
October 13, 2009^{[1]}	Minneapolis	United States	Target Center
October 15, 2009^{[1]}	Cleveland	United States	Quicken Loans Arena
October 16, 2009	Knoxville	United States	The Valarium
October 17, 2009^{[1]}	Charlottesville	United States	John Paul Jones Arena
October 18, 2009^{[1]}	Charlotte	United States	Time Warner Cable Arena
October 20, 2009	Norfolk	United States	The NorVa
October 21, 2009	Asheville	United States	The Orange Peel
October 23, 2009	Atlantic City	United States	House of Blues
October 24, 2009	Elmira	United States	First Arena
October 25, 2009	London	Canada	John Labatt Centre
October 26, 2009^{[1]}	Toronto	Canada	Air Canada Centre
October 27, 2009^{[1]}	Toronto	Canada	Air Canada Centre
October 29, 2009	Halifax	Canada	Cunard Center
October 30, 2009	Moncton	Canada	Moncton Coliseum
October 31, 2009^{[1]}	Quebec City	Canada	Colisée Pepsi
November 1, 2009^{[1]}	Quebec City	Canada	Colisée Pepsi
November 3, 2009^{[1]}	Ottawa	Canada	Scotiabank Place
November 5, 2009	Fort Wayne	United States	Piere's
November 6, 2009	Milwaukee	United States	Eagles Club
November 7, 2009	Springfield	United States	Shrine Mosque
November 9, 2009^{[1]}	Grand Rapids	United States	Van Andel Arena
November 10, 2009^{[1]}	Buffalo	United States	HSBC Arena
November 11, 2009	Washington, D.C.	United States	9:30 Club
November 12, 2009^{[1]}	Albany	United States	Times Union Center
November 14, 2009^{[1]}	New York City	United States	Madison Square Garden
November 15, 2009^{[1]}	New York City	United States	Madison Square Garden
Oceania
December 9, 2009	Auckland	New Zealand	Auckland Town Hall
December 11, 2009	Brisbane	Australia	Riverstage
December 12, 2009	Sydney	Australia	Luna Park Big Top
December 13, 2009	Sydney	Australia	Luna Park Big Top
December 15, 2009	Melbourne	Australia	Festival Hall
December 16, 2009	Adelaide	Australia	Thebarton Theatre
December 18, 2009	Perth	Australia	Metro City
Europe
February 9, 2010	Birmingham	United Kingdom	O_{2} Academy Birmingham
February 10, 2010	Newcastle	United Kingdom	O_{2} Academy Newcastle
February 11, 2010	Glasgow	United Kingdom	Barrowlands
February 12, 2010	Manchester	United Kingdom	Manchester Academy
February 13, 2010	London	United Kingdom	O_{2} Academy Brixton
February 15, 2010	Paris	France	Le Bataclan
February 16, 2010	Brussels	Belgium	Ancienne Belgique
February 17, 2010	Amsterdam	Netherlands	Melkweg
February 18, 2010	Cologne	Germany	Live Music Hall
February 19, 2010	Stuttgart	Germany	Zapata
February 21, 2010	Bologna	Italy	Estragon
February 22, 2010	Milan	Italy	Alcatraz
February 23, 2010	Rome	Italy	Alpheus
February 25, 2010	Vienna	Austria	Arena
February 26, 2010	Zürich	Switzerland	Volkshaus
February 27, 2010	Munich	Germany	Backstage Werk
February 28, 2010	Wiesbaden	Germany	Schlachthof
March 2, 2010	Berlin	Germany	Columbia Club
March 3, 2010	Hamburg	Germany	Grosse Freiheit 36
March 4, 2010	Copenhagen	Denmark	Vega
March 5, 2010	Stockholm	Sweden	Klubben
March 6, 2010	Umeå	Sweden	House of Metal Festival
March 8, 2010	Helsinki	Finland	Kulttuuritalo
March 10, 2010	Oslo	Norway	Sentrum Scene
March 11, 2010	Gothenburg	Sweden	Trädgår'n
March 12, 2010	Lund	Sweden	Mejeriet
Asia
April 7, 2010	Bangkok	Thailand	SCB Park Mahisorn Hall
April 9, 2010	Taipei	Taiwan	Liberty Square Auditorium
April 11, 2010	Beijing	China	Star Live House
April 13, 2010	Beijing	China	Star Live House
April 15, 2010	Singapore	Singapore	D'Marquee
April 17, 2010^{[5]}	Quezon City	Philippines	Amoranto Velodrome
April 20, 2010	Tokyo	Japan	Liquid Room
April 21, 2010	Nagoya	Japan	Club Quattro
April 22, 2010	Osaka	Japan	Club Quattro Shinsaibashi
India, Israel and Europe
May 15, 2010	Bangalore	India	Summer Storm Festival
May 17, 2010	Istanbul	Turkey	Maçka Küçükçiftlik Park
May 19, 2010	Ljubljana	Slovenia	Kino Šiška
May 20, 2010	Zagreb	Croatia	Boogaloo Club
May 21, 2010	Budapest	Hungary	Metalfest Open Air
May 23, 2010	Bratislava	Slovakia	Majestic Music Club
May 24, 2010	Prague	Czech Republic	Abaton
May 25, 2010	Warsaw	Poland	Progresja Klub
May 27, 2010	Moscow	Russia	DK Gorbunova
May 28, 2010	Saint Petersburg	Russia	Glav Club
May 30, 2010	Tel Aviv	Israel	Hangar 11
June 1, 2010	Athens	Greece	Fuzz Club
June 3, 2010	Graz	Austria	Orpheum
June 4, 2010	Fribourg	Switzerland	Fri-Son
June 5, 2010	Nürburgring	Germany	Rock am Ring Festival
June 6, 2010	Nuremberg	Germany	Rock im Park Festival
June 9, 2010	Esch-sur-Alzette	Luxembourg	Rockhal
June 10, 2010	Hengelo	Netherlands	Metropool
June 12, 2010	Donington Park	United Kingdom	Download Festival
North America ("Mayhem Festival")
July 7, 2010^{[3]}	Magna	United States	The Great Saltair
July 8, 2010^{[3]}	Las Vegas	United States	House of Blues
July 10, 2010	San Bernardino	United States	San Manuel Amphitheater
July 11, 2010	Mountain View	United States	Shoreline Amphitheatre
July 12, 2010^{[3]}	Portland	United States	Roseland Theater
July 13, 2010	Auburn	United States	White River Amphitheatre
July 14, 2010	Nampa	United States	Idaho Center Amphitheatre
July 16, 2010	Phoenix	United States	Cricket Wireless Pavilion
July 17, 2010	Albuquerque	United States	Journal Pavilion
July 18, 2010	Greenwood Village	United States	Comfort Dental Amphitheatre
July 19, 2010^{[3]}	Kansas City	United States	Beaumont Club
July 20, 2010	Maryland Heights	United States	Verizon Wireless Amphitheater
July 21, 2010	Cincinnati	United States	Riverbend Music Center
July 23, 2010	Camden	United States	Susquehanna Bank Center
July 24, 2010	Hartford	United States	Comcast Theatre
July 25, 2010	Montreal	Canada	Parc Jean-Drapeau
July 27, 2010	Mansfield	United States	Comcast Center
July 28, 2010	Holmdel	United States	PNC Bank Arts Center
July 29, 2010^{[3]}	Cleveland	United States	House of Blues
July 30, 2010	Tinley Park	United States	First Midwest Bank Amphitheatre
July 31, 2010	Noblesville	United States	Verizon Wireless Music Center
August 1, 2010	Atlanta	United States	Aaron's Amphitheatre at Lakewood
August 3, 2010	Raleigh	United States	Time Warner Cable Music Pavilion
August 4, 2010	Virginia Beach	United States	Virginia Beach Amphitheater
August 6, 2010	Clarkston	United States	DTE Energy Music Theatre
August 7, 2010	Burgettstown	United States	First Niagara Pavilion
August 8, 2010	Bristow	United States	Jiffy Lube Live
August 9, 2010^{[3]}	North Myrtle Beach	United States	House of Blues
August 10, 2010	Tampa	United States	1-800-ASK-GARY Amphitheatre
August 11, 2010	West Palm Beach	United States	Cruzan Amphitheatre
August 13, 2010	Dallas	United States	SuperPages.com Center
August 14, 2010	Oklahoma City	United States	Zoo Amphitheatre
August 15, 2010^{[3]}	San Antonio	United States	Sunken Garden
Latin America
September 26, 2010	São Paulo	Brazil	Espaço Lux
September 27, 2010	Buenos Aires	Argentina	El Teatro Flores
September 28, 2010	Buenos Aires	Argentina	El Teatro Flores
September 29, 2010	Santiago	Chile	Teatro Teletón
October 2, 2010	Bogotá	Colombia	Teatro Metropol
October 3, 2010	Caracas	Venezuela	Estacionamiento Casa del Artista
October 5, 2010	Mexico City	Mexico	Circo Volador
October 8, 2010	San Juan	Puerto Rico	Tito Puente Amphitheatre
Oceania
October 13, 2010^{[1]}	Auckland	New Zealand	Vector Arena
October 14, 2010^{[1]}	Auckland	New Zealand	Vector Arena
October 16, 2010^{[1]}	Brisbane	Australia	Entertainment Centre
October 18, 2010^{[1]}	Brisbane	Australia	Entertainment Centre
October 19, 2010^{[1]}	Brisbane	Australia	Entertainment Centre
October 22, 2010^{[1]}	Perth	Australia	Burswood Dome
October 23, 2010^{[1]}	Perth	Australia	Burswood Dome
November 10, 2010^{[1]}	Sydney	Australia	Acer Arena
November 11, 2010^{[1]}	Sydney	Australia	Acer Arena
November 13, 2010^{[1]}	Sydney	Australia	Acer Arena
November 15, 2010^{[1]}	Adelaide	Australia	Adelaide Entertainment Centre
November 16, 2010^{[1]}	Adelaide	Australia	Adelaide Entertainment Centre
November 18, 2010^{[1]}	Melbourne	Australia	Rod Laver Arena
November 20, 2010^{[1]}	Melbourne	Australia	Rod Laver Arena
November 21, 2010^{[1]}	Melbourne	Australia	Rod Laver Arena

- 1 Date supporting Metallica.
- 2 Date part of the "Metal Hammer: Defenders of the Faith" tour featuring co-headliners Dimmu Borgir.
- 3 Headline date; non-festival appearance.
- 4 Date featuring co-headliners In Flames.
- 5 Date featuring co-headliners Testament.

Canceled dates

December 17, 2008	Inglewood, United States	The Forum	Date as support to Metallica. Appearance canceled following a ban on the act performing by the owners of the venue, the Faithful Central Bible Church.
December 18, 2008	Inglewood, United States	The Forum	Date as support to Metallica. Appearance canceled following a ban on the act performing by the owners of the venue, the Faithful Central Bible Church.
April 13, 2010	Shanghai, China	Zhijiang Dream Factory	Date canceled after the concert was disapproved by the Shanghai Municipal Administration of Culture, Radio, Film and TV. The concert was subsequently moved to Beijing.
June 8, 2010	Bochum, Germany	Rhurcongress	Date as support to Slayer. Show canceled due to "acute vocal problems" suffered by Slayer bassist and vocalist Tom Araya.
October 1, 2010	Quito, Ecuador	Quito Fest	Festival appearance pulled after the band's flight into Ecuador was canceled due to political unrest in the country.
October 6, 2010	Monterrey, Mexico	Rock Amerika	Date canceled due to the promoter of the concert "not [fulfilling] obligations in regards to the band's fee, travel, or production logistics".

== Support acts ==
- 3 Inches of Blood (December 10, 2008; July 7, 8, 12, 19 and 29, 2010; August 9 and 15, 2010)
- As I Lay Dying (April 2 – May 15, 2009)
- August Burns Red (February 8 – March 12, 2010)
- Between the Buried and Me (February 8 – March 12, 2010)
- Children of Bodom (April 2 – May 8, 2009)
- DevilDriver (December 11–18, 2009)
- God Forbid (April 2 – May 15, 2009)
- Gwar (September 21 – November 7, 2009)
- Hatebreed (July 7, 8, 12, 19 and 29, 2010; August 9 and 15, 2010)
- High on Fire (December 11–18, 2009)
- The Faceless (December 9, 11, 16–19, 2008)
- Five Finger Death Punch (February 8–17, 2009)
- In Flames (February 23 and 24, 2009)
- Job for a Cowboy (December 16 and 18, 2008; September 21–27, 2009; October 29 – November 7, 2009; February 9 – March 12, 2010)
- Municipal Waste (November 24, 2008; April 2 – May 15, 2009)
- Shadows Fall (December 9–18, 2009)
- The Sword (December 6, 9–11 and 19, 2008)
- Subtract (December 9, 2009)
- Unearth (February 11–15, 2009; March 4–6, 2009)
