= Thine Eyes Bleed (album) =

Studio album by Thine Eyes Bleed
- Released: April 15, 2008
- Genre: Melodic death metal, thrash metal
- Label: The End Records
- Producer: Siegfried Meier

Thine Eyes Bleed chronology
In the Wake of Separation (2005)	Thine Eyes Bleed (2008)

Professional ratings
Review scores
Source	Rating
MetalSucks.net	3.5/5 stars
MouthofWar.net	3/5 stars

Thine Eyes Bleed is the second full-length album by the melodic death metal/thrash metal band Thine Eyes Bleed. Released, April 15, 2008, through The End Records.

== Track listing ==
No.	Title	Length
1.	"With Burning Breath"	4:06
2.	"The Dragon"	4:30
3.	"Crimson"	4:45
4.	"Dark White"	3:31
5.	"Shallow Skin"	3:13
6.	"Mota Diablo"	2:44
7.	"Truth in Evil"	4:26
8.	"The Mouth of Hell"	3:22
9.	"In Mortal Sin"	3:40
10.	"Revert to Stone"	6:08

== Personnel ==
=== Thine Eyes Bleed ===
- Justin Wolfe – vocals
- James Reid – lead guitar
- Jeff Phillips – rhythm guitar
- Johnny Araya – bass
- Darryl Stephens – drums

=== Additional personnel ===
- Morgan Lander – guest vocals on "Dark White"
- Lenzig Leal – guest vocals on "Truth in Evil"
- Siegfried Meier – producer, engineer
