= In the Wake of Separation =

Studio album by Thine Eyes Bleed
- Released: 6 June 2005, then re-released 30 May 2006
- Genre: Melodic death metal, thrash metal
- Label: The End Records

Thine Eyes Bleed chronology
In the Wake of Separation (2005)	'Thine Eyes Bleed' (2008)

In the Wake of Separation is an album by the melodic death metal/thrash metal band Thine Eyes Bleed. First released in 2005 by The End Records, it was reissued a year later on enhanced CD including one bonus track.

== Track listing ==
No.	Title	Length
1.	"Cold Victim"	3:58
2.	"Without Warning"	3:22
3.	"And Since Forgotten"	3:46
4.	"Live To Die"	4:38
5.	"Corpse You Up"	4:16
6.	"Innocent Mind"	3:05
7.	"Sliver"	3:39
8.	"Consequence Unknown"	3:40
9.	"Regret Your Fear"	5:55
10.	"Better Off Dead"	3:30
11.	"Cold Victim" (video)

The song "Without Warning" appears on the skateboarding video game, Tony Hawk's Project 8.
