= Resolution Tour =

2012–14 concert tour by Lamb of God

- Tour by Lamb of God
- Location: Africa; Asia; Europe; North America; Oceania; South America
- Associated album: Resolution
- Start date: January 22, 2012
- End date: January 25, 2014
- No. of shows: 174; 105 in North America; 46 in Europe; 13 in Oceania; 11 in Asia; 6 in South America; 2 in Africa

Lamb of God concert chronology
- Wrath Tour (2008–10); Resolution Tour (2012–14)

The Resolution Tour was a concert tour by American heavy metal band Lamb of God in support of the group's seventh studio album, Resolution, which was released in January 2012.

== Overview ==
The tour begin on January 22, 2012 with a concert at the band's hometown of Richmond, Virginia. After a North American leg, the band toured Asia, Australia (performing on the Soundwave Festival), and Latin America. In May 2012, the band played dates in India and Israel before beginning a month-long European leg.

On June 28, 2012, shortly after the band had landed in Ruzyně Airport for their scheduled concert that night in Prague, vocalist Randy Blythe was arrested on charges of manslaughter over an incident that took place more than two years ago. According to reports, a 19-year-old man named Daniel N. was pushed by Blythe after he leaped on stage during the band's last concert in Prague at the club Abaton on May 24, 2010. The man fell directly on his head, causing serious brain trauma and eventually lapsing into coma. He died from his injuries a few weeks later. Representatives of the band have said that Blythe is "wrongly accused" and that they "expect him to be fully exonerated". On June 30, 2012, the Prague 8 District Court ruled that Blythe be remanded in custody, as he was considered a flight risk. The judge ruled that Blythe may be released on a bail of CZK4,000,000, approximately US$200,000. The concert in Prague and festival appearances at With Full Force in Germany and the Tuska Open Air Metal Festival in Finland were canceled as a result. On July 17, 2012, a panel of three judges in Prague Municipal Court reviewed the Prague 8 District Court's bail decision as challenged by the prosecutor. Blythe's bail was subsequently doubled to CZK8,000,000, approximately US$400,000.

On July 26, 2012, it was confirmed that the group's upcoming U.S. tour with Dethklok and Gojira was canceled, due to Blythe's continued incarceration in Prague. On August 2, 2012, Blythe was released from custody after spending more than a month in prison in Prague. On August 3, 2012, the band announced that a U.S. tour would be rebooked, to begin on October 30, 2012. The band's previously canceled appearances at the two Knotfest events, the inaugural music festival created by Slipknot to be held in mid-August, was reinstated following Blythe's release.

On September 5, 2012, the band announced a 38-date U.S. tour starting October 30, 2012 in Phoenix, Arizona, with In Flames as main support. Hatebreed performed from October 30 to November 19, Hellyeah performed from November 20 to December 16, and British band Sylosis was the opening act on all dates. Bassist John Campbell had to pull out due to a family emergency on November 11, 2013 and the show at the ShoWare Center in Kent was canceled. He rejoined the tour in 2014 but during that time, Fear Factory bassist Matt DeVries filled in for him. In 2014, guitarist Mark Morton had to pull out due to a family emergency. Paul Waggoner from Between the Buried and Me filled in for him.

== Tour dates ==
Date	City	Country	Venue
North America; Support acts: Kepone and Hex Machine (first date only); The Acacia Strain and Too Late the Hero; Manahan (replaced Too Late the Hero on January 27)
January 22, 2012	Richmond	United States	The National
January 24, 2012	New York City	United States	Irving Plaza
January 25, 2012	Boston	United States	Paradise Rock Club
January 26, 2012	Philadelphia	United States	Trocadero Theatre
January 27, 2012	Toronto	Canada	Phoenix Concert Theatre
January 28, 2012	Washington, D.C.	United States	9:30 Club
Asia; Support acts: The Black Dahlia Murder (Philippines only), Chthonic (Taiwan and Japanese dates only)
February 12, 2012	Seoul	South Korea	AX-Korea Hall
February 14, 2012	Shanghai	China	Mao LiveHouse
February 16, 2012	Taipei	Taiwan	Legacy
February 18, 2012	Manila	Philippines	World Trade Center Metro Manila
February 20, 2012 (Note: Date supporting Judas Priest)	Singapore	Singapore	Fort Canning Park
February 22, 2012	Tokyo	Japan	Shibuya O-East
February 23, 2012	Osaka	Japan	Big Cat
Australia (Soundwave Festival); Support acts: The Black Dahlia Murder and In Flames (Headline dates only)
February 25, 2012	Brisbane	Australia	RNA Showgrounds
February 26, 2012	Sydney	Australia	Sydney Olympic Park
February 28, 2012 (Note: Headline shows, non Soundwave festival appearance)	Brisbane	Australia	Eatons Hill Hotel and Function Centre
March 1, 2012	Canberra	Australia	UC Refectory
March 2, 2012	Melbourne	Australia	Royal Melbourne Showgrounds
March 3, 2012	Adelaide	Australia	Bonython Park
March 5, 2012	Perth	Australia	Claremont Showground
Latin America; Support acts: Hatebreed and Lacuna Coil (March 31-April 4)
March 31, 2012	São Paulo	Brazil	A Seringueira
April 2, 2012	Buenos Aires	Argentina	Teatro Flores
April 4, 2012	Santiago	Chile	Teatro Caupolican
April 6, 2012	Quito	Ecuador	Parqueaderos del Estadio Olímpico Atahualpa
April 7, 2012	Bogotá	Colombia	Teatro Metropol
April 8, 2012	Caracas	Venezuela	CIEC Caracas
April 10, 2012	Mexico City	Mexico	José Cuervo Salón
Asia; Support act: Betzefer (Israel date only)
May 26, 2012	Bangalore	India	Clark's Exotica
May 30, 2012	Tel Aviv	Israel	Hangar 11
Europe (Festivals); Support acts: Decapitated (Poland), DevilDriver (Slovakia), Revoker (Munich, Germany), Sylosis (UK and Ireland) and The Eyes (Spain)
June 1, 2012	Nürburgring	Germany	Rock am Ring Festival
June 2, 2012	Nijmegen	Netherlands	Fortarock Festival
June 3, 2012	Nuremberg	Germany	Rock im Park Festival
June 5, 2012	Kraków	Poland	Klub Studio
June 6, 2012	Bratislava	Slovakia	Majestic Music Club
June 7, 2012	Munich	Germany	Backstage Werk
June 8, 2012	Nickelsdorf	Austria	Nova Rock Festival
June 10, 2012	Donington Park	United Kingdom	Download Festival
June 12, 2012	Belfast	United Kingdom	Mandela Hall
June 13, 2012	Dublin	Ireland	The Academy
June 15, 2012	Gothenburg	Sweden	Metaltown Festival
June 16, 2012	Copenhagen	Denmark	Copenhell Festival
June 17, 2012	Clisson	France	Hellfest
June 19, 2012	Madrid	Spain	La Riviera
June 20, 2012	Barcelona	Spain	Razzmatazz 2
June 22, 2012	Dessel	Belgium	Graspop Metal Meeting
June 23, 2012	Basel	Switzerland	Earshaker Days Festival
June 24, 2012	Milan	Italy	Gods of Metal
June 26, 2012	Arendal	Norway	Hove Festival
United States (Knotfest)
August 17, 2012	Pacific Junction	United States	Mid-America Motor Complex
August 18, 2012	Somerset	United States	Somerset Amphitheater
North America; Support acts: In Flames, Hatebreed (October 30-November 19), Sylosis, Hellyeah (November 20-December 16) and Cannibal Corpse (replaced Hellyeah on December 2)
October 30, 2012	Phoenix	United States	Comerica Theatre
October 31, 2012	Los Angeles	United States	Hollywood Palladium
November 3, 2012	Lubbock	United States	Lonestar Pavilion
November 4, 2012	San Antonio	United States	Backstage Live
November 5, 2012	Oklahoma City	United States	Diamond Ballroom
November 7, 2012	St. Louis	United States	The Pageant
November 8, 2012	Indianapolis	United States	Egyptian Room
November 9, 2012	Milwaukee	United States	Eagles Ballroom
November 10, 2012	Saint Paul	United States	Myth
November 12, 2012	Louisville	United States	Expo Five
November 14, 2012	Stroudsburg	United States	Sherman Theater
November 15, 2012	Glens Falls	United States	Glens Falls Civic Center
November 16, 2012	New York City	United States	Roseland Ballroom
November 17, 2012	Silver Spring	United States	The Fillmore Silver Spring
November 19, 2012	Orlando	United States	House of Blues
November 20, 2012	Atlanta	United States	The Tabernacle
November 21, 2012	Charlotte	United States	The Fillmore Charlotte
November 23, 2012	Wallingford	United States	Oakdale Theatre
November 24, 2012	Philadelphia	United States	Electric Factory
November 25, 2012	Boston	United States	House of Blues
November 26, 2012	Niagara Falls	United States	The Rapids Theatre
November 27, 2012	Pittsburgh	United States	Stage AE
November 28, 2012	Richmond	United States	The National
November 30, 2012	Chicago	United States	Congress Theater
December 1, 2012	Detroit	United States	The Fillmore Detroit
December 2, 2012	Columbus	United States	Lifestyle Communities Pavilion
December 3, 2012	Grand Rapids	United States	Orbit Room
December 4, 2012	West Des Moines	United States	Val Air Ballroom
December 6, 2012	Houston	United States	Bayou Music Center
December 7, 2012	Dallas	United States	Palladium Ballroom
December 8, 2012	Kansas City	United States	Uptown Theater
December 10, 2012	Denver	United States	Fillmore Auditorium
December 11, 2012	Farmington	United States	McGee Park Memorial Coliseum
December 12, 2012 (Note: Rescheduled from November 1, 2012)	Las Vegas	United States	House of Blues
December 13, 2012	San Francisco	United States	The Warfield
December 14, 2012	Medford	United States	Medford Armory
December 15, 2012	Spokane	United States	Knitting Factory
December 16, 2012	Seattle	United States	Showbox at the Market
North America; Support acts: Decapitated, Anciients (Note: replaced Terror who dropping off the tour) (May 16-June 10) and The Acacia Strain (June 12-June 20)		United States	
May 16, 2013	Asheville	United States	The Orange Peel
May 17, 2013	Chattanooga	United States	Track 29
May 18, 2013	Nashville	United States	Marathon Music Works
May 19, 2013	Columbus	United States	Rock on the Range
May 20, 2013	Columbia	United States	Blue Note
May 22, 2013	Boulder	United States	Boulder Theater
May 23, 2013	Salt Lake City	United States	In the Venue
May 24, 2013	Boise	United States	Revolution Center
May 25, 2013	Reno	United States	Knitting Factory
May 26, 2013	Ventura	United States	Majestic Ventura Theater
May 28, 2013	Tucson	United States	Rialto Theatre
May 29, 2013	Anaheim	United States	The Grove of Anaheim
May 31, 2013	Chico	United States	Senator Theater
June 1, 2013	Portland	United States	Roseland Ballroom
June 2, 2013	Kennewick	United States	Toyota Ice Arena
June 3, 2013	Missoula	United States	Wilma Theatre
June 4, 2013	Billings	United States	Shrine Auditorium
June 6, 2013	Fargo	United States	The Venue
June 7, 2013	Madison	United States	Orpheum Theater
June 8, 2013	Lincoln	United States	Bourbon Theater
June 9, 2013	Wichita	United States	The Cotillion
June 10, 2013	Tulsa	United States	Cain's Ballroom
June 12, 2013	Fort Wayne	United States	Pierre's
June 13, 2013	Rochester	United States	Water Street Music Hall
June 14, 2013	Atlantic City	United States	House of Blues
June 15, 2013	Montebello	Canada	Amnesia Rockfest
June 16, 2013	Portland	United States	State Theatre
June 18, 2013	Worcester	United States	Worcester Palladium
June 19, 2013	Baltimore	United States	Rams Head Live!
June 20, 2013	Norfolk	United States	The NorVa
Europe; Support acts: Sylosis (German, Wolverhampton UK, Netherlands and France dates only), War from a Harlots Mouth (German dates only) and Tesseract (Ireland and Belfast dates only)
August 1, 2013	Viveiro	Spain	Resurrection Fest
August 3, 2013	Wacken	Germany	Wacken Open Air
August 4, 2013	Cologne	Germany	Essigfabrik
August 5, 2013	Hamburg	Germany	Markthalle Hamburg
August 6, 2013	Berlin	Germany	C-Club
August 8, 2013	Gävle	Sweden	Getaway Rock Festival
August 10, 2013	Walton-on-Trent	United Kingdom	Bloodstock Open Air
August 11, 2013	Dublin	Ireland	Olympia Theatre
August 12, 2013	Belfast	United Kingdom	The Limelight
August 13, 2013	Wolverhampton	United Kingdom	Wulfrun Hall
August 15, 2013 (Note: Rescheduled from August 14, 2013)	Amsterdam	Netherlands	Melkweg
August 16, 2013	Dinkelsbühl	Germany	Summer Breeze Open Air
August 17, 2013	Hasselt	Belgium	Pukkelpop
August 18, 2013	Paris	France	Bataclan
Oceania; Support acts: Meshuggah (except NZ date); 8 Foot Sativa (NZ date only)
September 18, 2013	Auckland	New Zealand	The Powerstation
September 20, 2013	Brisbane	Australia	The Tivoli
September 21, 2013	Sydney	Australia	UNSW Roundhouse
September 22, 2013	Melbourne	Australia	Festival Hall
September 24, 2013	Adelaide	Australia	Thebarton Theatre
September 26, 2013	Perth	Australia	Metro City
Asia
September 30, 2013	Bangkok	Thailand	Hollywood Awards
North America; Support acts: Killswitch Engage, Testament and Huntress
October 22, 2013	Toronto	Canada	Kool Haus
October 23, 2013	Toronto	Canada	Sound Academy
October 24, 2013	Montreal	Canada	Métropolis
October 25, 2013	New York City	United States	Roseland Ballroom
October 26, 2013	Wallingford	United States	Oakdale Theatre
October 28, 2013	Columbus	United States	Lifestyle Communities Pavilion
October 29, 2013	Detroit	United States	The Fillmore Detroit
October 30, 2013	Chicago	United States	Aragon Ballroom
November 1, 2013	Kansas City	United States	Midland Theatre
November 2, 2013	Grand Prairie	United States	Verizon Theatre at Grand Prairie
November 3, 2013	Socorro	United States	Socorro Entertainment Center
November 5, 2013	Denver	United States	Fillmore Auditorium
November 7, 2013	Tempe	United States	Marquee Theatre
November 8, 2013	Los Angeles	United States	Hollywood Palladium
November 9, 2013	Oakland	United States	Fox Oakland Theatre
November 12, 2013	Vancouver	Canada	Queen Elizabeth Theatre
November 14, 2013	Edmonton	Canada	Shaw Conference Centre
November 15, 2013	Calgary	Canada	Big Four Building
November 16, 2013	Saskatoon	Canada	Prairieland Park
November 18, 2013	Saint Paul	United States	Myth
November 19, 2013	Milwaukee	United States	Eagles Ballroom
November 20, 2013	Grand Rapids	United States	Orbit Room
November 22, 2013	Sayreville	United States	Starland Ballroom
November 23, 2013	Boston	United States	House of Blues
November 24, 2013	Philadelphia	United States	Electric Factory
November 25, 2013	Pittsburgh	United States	Stage AE
November 26, 2013	Silver Spring	United States	The Fillmore Silver Spring
Europe; Support acts: Decapitated and Huntress
January 6, 2014	Vienna	Austria	Arena
January 7, 2014	Milan	Italy	Alcatraz
January 8, 2014	Zürich	Switzerland	Komplex 457
January 10, 2014	Tilburg	Netherlands	013
January 11, 2014	Brussels	Belgium	Ancienne Belgique
January 12, 2014	Southampton	United Kingdom	Southampton Guildhall
January 13, 2014	Leeds	United Kingdom	O_{2} Academy Leeds
January 15, 2014	Newcastle	United Kingdom	O_{2} Academy Newcastle
January 16, 2014	Glasgow	United Kingdom	O_{2} Academy Glasgow
January 17, 2014	Birmingham	United Kingdom	O_{2} Academy Birmingham
January 18, 2014	London	United Kingdom	O_{2} Academy Brixton
January 19, 2014	Manchester	United Kingdom	Manchester Academy
January 20, 2014	Bristol	United Kingdom	O_{2} Academy Bristol
Africa; Support acts: Mind Assault and The Drift		United Kingdom	
January 24, 2014	Cape Town	South Africa	Cape Town City Hall
January 25, 2014	Johannesburg	South Africa	MTN Expo Centre

Canceled dates

March 7, 2012	Auckland, New Zealand	The Studio	Date canceled due to a medical emergency regarding a family member.
March 9, 2012	Anchorage, United States	Egan Convention Center	Date canceled due to a medical emergency regarding a family member.
April 1, 2012	Curitiba, Brazil	Curitiba Master Hall	Date canceled due to scheduling conflict.
May 28, 2012	Athens, Greece	Fuzz Club	Date canceled.
June 26, 2012	Zagreb, Croatia	Boogaloo Club	Date cancelled.
June 27, 2012	Ljubljana, Slovenia	Kino Šiška	Date cancelled.
June 28, 2012	Prague, Czech Republic	Rock Café	Date canceled.
June 29, 2012	Löbnitz, Germany	With Full Force	Festival appearance canceled.
July 1, 2012	Helsinki, Finland	Tuska Open Air Metal Festival	Festival appearance canceled.
August 1, 2012	Seattle, United States	WaMu Theater	Date canceled.
August 2, 2012	Vancouver, Canada	Queen Elizabeth Theatre	Date canceled.
August 4, 2012	Calgary, Canada	Big Four Building	Date canceled.
August 5, 2012	Edmonton, Canada	Shaw Conference Centre	Date canceled.
August 7, 2012	Winnipeg, Canada	Winnipeg Convention Centre	Date canceled.
August 9, 2012	Milwaukee, United States	Eagles Ballroom	Date canceled.
August 10, 2012	Columbus, United States	Lifestyle Communities Pavilion	Date canceled.
August 11, 2012	Toronto, Canada	Heavy T.O.	Festival appearance canceled.
August 12, 2012	Montreal, Canada	Heavy MTL	Festival appearance canceled.
August 14, 2012	Walker, United States	DeltaPlex Arena	Date canceled.
August 15, 2012	St. Charles, United States	Family Arena	Date canceled.
August 19, 2012	Kansas City, United States	Midland Theatre	Date canceled.
August 21, 2012	Chicago, United States	Congress Theater	Date canceled.
August 22, 2012	Plymouth Township, United States	Compuware Arena	Date canceled.
August 23, 2012	Pittsburgh, United States	Stage AE	Date canceled.
August 24, 2012	Charlotte, United States	Time Warner Cable Arena	Date canceled.
August 25, 2012	Norfolk, United States	Ted Constant Convocation Center	Date canceled.
August 26, 2012	Baltimore, United States	Pier Six Concert Pavilion	Date canceled.
August 29, 2012	New York City, United States	Roseland Ballroom	Date canceled.
August 30, 2012	Lowell, United States	Tsongas Center	Date canceled.
August 31, 2012	Wallingford, United States	Oakdale Theatre	Date canceled.
September 1, 2012	Philadelphia, United States	Electric Factory	Date canceled.
September 2, 2012	Asbury Park, United States	Asbury Park Convention Hall	Date canceled.
September 4, 2012	Hollywood, United States	Hard Rock Live	Date canceled.
September 5, 2012	Atlanta, United States	The Tabernacle	Date canceled.
September 7, 2012	Houston, United States	Bayou Music Center	Date canceled.
September 8, 2012	San Antonio, United States	Sunken Garden Theater	Date canceled.
September 9, 2012	Grand Prairie, United States	Verizon Theatre at Grand Prairie	Date canceled.
September 11, 2012	Denver, United States	Fillmore Auditorium	Date canceled.
September 13, 2012	Phoenix, United States	Comerica Theatre	Date canceled.
September 14, 2012	Los Angeles, United States	Gibson Amphitheatre	Date canceled.
September 15, 2012	San Francisco, United States	Bill Graham Civic Auditorium	Date canceled.
December 7–10, 2012	Miami, United States	Mayhem Festival Cruise	Event canceled due to "circumstances beyond the organizer's control".
September 28, 2013	Kuala Lumpur, Malaysia	KL Live (Rockaway Festival)	Cancelled due to various reasons
November 11, 2013	Kent, United States	ShoWare Center	Date canceled due to family emergency
March 15, 2014	Mexico City, Mexico	Hell & Heaven Metal Fest	Festival was cancelled two days prior to start date

== Support acts ==
- The Acacia Strain (January 24–28, 2012; June 12–20, 2013)
- Too Late the Hero (January 24–26 and 28, 2012)
- Manahan (January 27, 2012)
- Chthonic (February 16, 22 and 23, 2012)
- The Black Dahlia Murder (February 18, 28 and March 1, 2012)
- In Flames (February 28–March 1, 2012; October 30–December 16, 2012)
- Hatebreed (March 31–April 10, 2012; October 30–November 19, 2012)
- Lacuna Coil (March 31–April 4, 2012)
- Betzefer (May 30, 2012)
- Decapitated (June 5, 2012; May 16–June 20, 2013)
- DevilDriver (June 6, 2012)
- Sylosis (June 12 and 13, 2012; October 30–December 16, 2012)
- Hellyeah (November 20–December 1; December 3–16, 2012)
- Anciients (May 16–June 10, 2013)
- Meshuggah (September 20–26, 2013)
- Mind Assault (January 24 and 25, 2014)

== Personnel ==
- Randy Blythe – vocals
- Mark Morton – lead guitar
- Willie Adler – rhythm guitar
- John Campbell – bass
- Chris Adler – drums

== Temporary replacements ==
- Matt DeVries – bass [filling in for John Campbell from November 12–26, 2013]
- Paul Waggoner – lead guitar [filling in for Mark Morton on 2014 dates]
