= Mind Assault =

South African heavy metal band

- Origin: Somerset West, Western Cape, South Africa
- Genres: Melodic death metal, heavy metal
- Years active: 2004–present
- Label: Independent
- Members: Jacques Fourie; Patrick Davidson; Donovan Tose; Andries Smit; Ryan Eberlin
- Past members: Stephan Lenhoff; Francois Pretorius

Mind Assault is a heavy metal band formed in 2003, that first emerged in October 2004 under the name Mind Assault. Their members are based in Somerset West near Cape Town, South Africa. They were the first extreme metal band to use their native language Afrikaans in their music, maintaining a balanced use of Afrikaans and English in their music. This language usage results from a re-emerging consciousness (see Voëlvry) among young Afrikaans people through alternative sub-cultures, reflected by bands such as Fokofpolisiekar and Kobus!, which results from a closer observation of their own cultural heritage.

Mind Assault has become known in South Africa as a form of activism for political freedom on stage and in writing. The band's lyrical content narrates issues of state and political interest and matters of personal frustration and social problems.

The band consists of a stable line-up of three founding members. Whilst Mind Assault originally had trouble finding a suitable drummer in their home town, Stephen Lenhoff (a high school friend and multi-instrumentalist) joined the band on drums for a period of almost three years before Andries Smit started as drummer in January 2007. Smit quickly become a vital contributor to the band not only by drumming, but also as composer, establishing his role as the fifth member.

== History ==
In October 2004, Mind Assault performed their debut appearance. The founding members of the band were Jacques Fourie, Franscois Pretorius, Patrick Davidson, and Donovan Tose. Because they could not find a drummer, a friend of the band, Stephan Lenhoff, played drums, until Andries Smit replaced him as a permanent member in 2007.

Mind Assault released their first demo EP, entitled Social Engineering, in 2005. During this time they playing a number of underground concerts and festivals, and initiated a fresh concept of organizing "party-buses" to select performances, which in itself became an event that attracted a lot of additional fans.

In the beginning of 2006, Mind Assault played their first cross-genre music festival to a very receptive audience. They embarked on their first national tour, entitled Destructour'06, in partnership with one of South Africa's metal acts, SacriFist. The success of the tour ensured the band's progress on a national level. Throughout 2006, the band continued to perform shows in their home province, gathering material for a home DVD release.

In 2007, Mind Assault released a home DVD, titled F*k Voort En Suip Baie, a first in South Africa. They concluded the year with headlining slots at festivals such as Metal4Africa, Empyraen fest, and Whiplash.

In February 2008, Mind Assault released their debut LP Stigma at METAL4AFRICA Summerfest, breaking attendance records in the region for an all-African, all-metal event. In 2008 they also headlined at RAMFest, a large annual cross-genre music festival. They toured South Africa's neighboring country Namibia. In 2008, Mind Assault headlined Metal4Africa and Whiplash again. Mind Assault are the only band ever to have been invited to play Whiplash five years in a row. The band initiated another national tour with old friends SacriFist for Destructour'08.

In 2009, and after the loss of the drum kit, Mind Assault maintained a slowed pace, but continued work on new material and worked on delivering some of the most entertaining performances seen in African metal until that point, repeating appearances at festivals such as RAMFest and Metal4Africa.

In addition to the usual gig circuit, 2010 saw Mind Assault's first appearance at one South Africa's oldest and most well-known festivals, Oppikoppi, and took the remainder of the year to track their next self-released EP, Metal Rites.

Metal Rites was released at the end of January in 2011, with the band embarking on another national tour, including a first-time appearance in the city of Bloemfontein that year.

By the end of 2012, the band shifted focus from the live scene towards a more studio-oriented approach. This shift was primarily prompted by the return of lead guitarist and founding member Francois Pretorius to his country of birth Namibia. Despite the move, members of Mind Assault elected not to change the members of the band but continue writing and recording with the original line-up.

Mind Assault reached another milestone in 2013 when they traveled to their first Gauteng RAMfest to join South Africa's Pestroy in opening for the UK's Bring Me the Horizon and Rise Against from the US.

In 2014, Mind Assault released four self-produced tracks and a music video in anticipation of their support of the Lamb of God South African tour. In 2015, Francois Pretorius departed from the band after settling in Namibia and was replaced by Ryan Eberlin. The band is currently working on their second full-length album entitled The Cult of Conflict tentatively due in 2020.

== Musical style and direction ==
Mind Assault combines brutality with melody to create a powerful mixture. Guttural vocals are written with a mix of English and Afrikaans (a native language in South Africa). They were the first band to use Afrikaans on a regular basis in extreme metal.

== Tours and live performance highlights ==
- 2006 – Destructour'06 – Destructour was the title given to a collaboration project between Cape Town-based Mind Assault and Johannesburg-based SacriFist. Each band took it upon themselves to prepare a number of dates for the tour in and around their local region, thus gaining powerful exposure for each other when both bands appeared as co-headliners at all dates and in all of the cities of the tour, in addition to more localized support acts. The territory covered included the Western Cape, Gauteng and Mpumalanga.
- 2007 – A Showcase of African Metal – Mind Assault co-headlined the first concert of a continuing series hosted by Metal4Africa.com.
- 2008 – Destructour'08 – A repeat of the original Destructour concept.
- 2008 – Windhoek Metal Festival'08 – Mind Assault's first performance outside of South Africa, in neighboring country Namibia.
- 2008 – Witchfest – Mind Assault was included as local support for Carcass, who headlined the same night of the festival.
- 2010 – Destructour'10 – This was another repeat of the original concept, this time including both bands finishing up the tour by co-headlining the metal stage at RAMfest Cape Town.
- 2013 – RAMfest Johannesburg – Mind Assault was included as local support for Bring Me the Horizon, who headlined the same night of the festival.
- 2014 – Resolution Tour – Mind Assault was included as local support for both dates on South Africa's leg of the Lamb of God international tour cycle. The dates were 24 January 2014 at Cape Town City Hall and 25 January at the Johannesburg Expo Center (Nazrec). Mind Assault's appearances alongside the US greats was met with very positive reviews.
- 2016 – Rockstadt Romania – Mind Assault was invited to perform at Rockstadt Extreme Fest in Râșnov, Romania. Their performance was positively received, drawing a large and engaged crowd. They were also interviewed by Romanian radio station Definite Rock.

== Band members ==
=== Current members ===
- Jacques Fourie – vocals (2004–present)
- Patrick Davidson – rhythm guitar (2004–present)
- Donovan Tose – bass guitar (2004–present)
- Andries Smit – drums (2007–present)
- Neil Bezuidenhout – lead guitar (2024–present)

=== Previous members ===
- Stephan Lenhoff – drums (2004–2006)
- Franscois Pretorius – lead guitar (2004–2015)
- Ryan Eberlin – lead guitar (2015-2020)
- Stefan Steyn - lead guitar (2020-2024)

== Timeline ==
=== Live sessions done with Mind Assault ===
- Karen Pretorius – keyboards (2008–2009)
- Tim Brown – vocals (2010)
- Neil Bezuidenhout – guitar (2012)
- Theunis Cilliers – bass (2013)

== Discography ==
=== Albums ===
- Stigma (2008)
- The Cult of Conflict (2021)

=== EPs ===
- Social Engineering (2005)
- Metal Rites (2011)

=== Single-track releases ===
- "Tiete" (2013)
- "Mag Verkrag" (2014)
- "Annihilation of Man" (2014)
- "True Force" (2014)
- "New World Disorder" (2014)
- "Corroded World" (2020)
- "Burn Down the Nation" (2020)

=== Compilations ===
- Fear the Noise (2006)
- Innocent Blood (2006)
- Hammer The Masses (2007)
- Kopskoot (2009)

=== DVDs ===
- F*k Voort en Suip Baie DVD (2007)
