= Sacrament (album) =

Studio album by Lamb of God
- Released: August 22, 2006
- Recorded: 2006
- Studios: Spin Studios, Queens, New York; Sound of Music Studios, Richmond, Virginia
- Genres: Groove metal; metalcore; thrash metal
- Length: 46:14
- Labels: Epic; Prosthetic 82876-83385 2
- Producer: Machine

Lamb of God chronology
Killadelphia (2005)	Sacrament (2006)	Wrath (2009)

Singles from Sacrament
- 1. "Redneck" Released: June 2006

Professional ratings
Review scores
Source	Rating
About.com	4.5/5 stars
AllMusic	3.5/5 stars
Blabbermouth.net	8/10
Brave Words & Bloody Knuckles	8.5/10
Collector's Guide to Heavy Metal	8/10
Drowned in Sound	9/10
Entertainment Weekly	B
PopMatters	7/10
Rolling Stone	3/5 stars
Spin	8/10
Stylus Magazine	B

Sacrament is the fourth studio album by American heavy metal band Lamb of God. Released on August 22, 2006, Sacrament debuted at No. 8 on the Billboard 200 charts with first-week sales of 63,000. The album was the top-selling heavy metal album of 2006 and received the Album of the Year award from Revolver magazine. As of 2010, it has sold over 331,000 copies in the United States, and was certified Gold by the RIAA on September 27, 2019.

The song "Redneck" was nominated in the 2007 Grammy Awards for Best Metal Performance, but lost out to Slayer's "Eyes of the Insane".

== Background and recording ==
After headlining the 2005 'Sounds of the Underground' tour in August 2005, Lamb of God returned to Richmond, Virginia and began the writing process for Sacrament.

In a 2006 press release drummer Chris Adler stated:

We've taken this process very seriously, We have been spending 5 or 6 days a week and 6-8 hours a day writing. It's a very intense and productive process that has paid off in a very big way.

Following several months of writing the band took a break in December 2005 to headline a European tour.

The album was produced by Machine who produced their previous 2004 album Ashes of the Wake. Pre-production began in Richmond, Virginia on March 13, 2006.

== Release and promotion ==
The albums first and only single "Redneck" was released on June 21, 2006.

The album was later released on August 22, 2006 and sold 62,000 copies in its first week debuting at number 8 on the Billboard 200. The album went on to become the best selling heavy metal album of 2006. It was initially released on CD and DVD deluxe edition, which included a 90 minute special behind the scenes footage of the making of the album.

The band appeared on major tours to support the album, including The Unholy Alliance with Slayer, Mastodon, Children of Bodom, and Thine Eyes Bleed, Gigantour, supporting Megadeth; main stage at Ozzfest; an appearance at the Download Festival, and an exclusive co-headlining tour with Killswitch Engage, Soilwork, and DevilDriver, where Killswitch Engage and Lamb of God shared headlining spots alternately each show. The song "Pathetic" was performed live on the February 9, 2007 edition of Late Night with Conan O'Brien. This marked the first major network performance for Lamb of God.

== Critical reception ==
The album received generally positive reviews Christopher Monger of AllMusic dubbed "Pathetic" one of the best metal songs of 2006 and gave the album a 3.5/5 stating "If Sacrament suffers from anything, it's a pounding sense of sameness. They rarely stray from the "Drop D" tuning, resulting in a second half that tends to blur, shake, and sputter out a bit, but there's no denying Lamb of God's almost unnerving power to conjure wind from the tiniest of stereo speakers." Blabbermouth.net gave the album a 8/10 claiming "Sacrament" is a "damn fine album that is assuredly worthy of accolades, based on a refinement of its patented sound and a consistently strong batch of songs. "Sacrament" is in no way disappointing and will be a contender for many writers' year-end Top 10 lists; it's just that the outstanding "Ashes of the Wake" is awfully hard to top."

=== Awards ===
Year	Award	Category	Result
2006	Revolver	Album of the Year	Won
2006	Metal Storm Awards	Best Thrash Metal Album	Nominated
2007	Grammy Awards	Best Metal Performance (for Redneck)	Nominated

=== Accolades ===
Publication	Country	Accolade	Year	Rank
Loudwire	US	10 Best Metal Albums of 2006	2020	7
Revolver	US	13 Great Metal Albums From 2006	2026	NR

== Track listing ==
All tracks are written by Lamb of God.

No.	Title	Length
1.	"Walk with Me in Hell"	5:11
2.	"Again We Rise"	4:30
3.	"Redneck"	3:41
4.	"Pathetic"	4:31
5.	"Foot to the Throat"	3:13
6.	"Descending"	3:35
7.	"Blacken the Cursed Sun"	5:28
8.	"Forgotten (Lost Angels)"	3:05
9.	"Requiem"	4:10
10.	"More Time to Kill"	3:36
11.	"Beating on Death's Door"	5:06
Total length:		46:14

- The deluxe edition of the album includes a bonus DVD with two videos for the track "Redneck" and a 90-minute making of the album itself, along with an Easter egg video segment entitled "Go Karts". The DVD was produced by High Roller Studios and directed by Doug Spangenberg, the same director from Lamb of God's Killadelphia DVD.

Best Buy exclusive bonus disc (XM Satellite Radio studio sessions)
No.	Title	Length
1.	"Laid to Rest" (Live)	3:50
2.	"Now You've Got Something to Die For" (Live)	3:39
3.	"Omerta" (Live)	4:45
Total length:		11:34

== Personnel ==
Lamb of God

- Randy Blythe – vocals
- Mark Morton – guitar
- Willie Adler – guitar
- John Campbell – bass
- Chris Adler – drums

Production

- Machine – producer, mixing
- Drums recorded by Josh Wilbur and Machine
- Pro Tools by Josh Wilbur and Richard Stoltz, assisted by Jim Feeney
- Guitars recorded by Josh Wilbur, Ian Whalen and Machine; Additional editing and assistance by Jim Feeney; Assisted by Jeremy Miller and Brian Hoffa
- Vocals recorded at The Machine Shop, Hoboken, NJ, assisted by Jim Feeney
- Brian Gardner – mastering at Bernie Grundman Mastering, Hollywood, CA
- Vlado Meller – mastering on "Redneck" at Sony Studios, NYC

Artwork

- K3n Adams – art direction, design

== Charts ==
Chart (2006)	Peak position
Australian Albums (ARIA)	25
Irish Albums (IRMA)	79
UK Albums (Official Charts)	89
UK Rock & Metal Albums (Official Charts)	5
US Billboard 200	8
US Top Rock Albums (Billboard)	1
US Indie Store Album Sales (Billboard)	3

== Certifications ==
Region	Certification	Certified units/sales
Canada (Music Canada)	Gold	50,000^{‡}
United Kingdom (BPI)	Silver	60,000^{‡}
United States (RIAA)	Gold	500,000^{‡}
^{‡} Sales+streaming figures based on certification alone.
