= The Unholy Alliance Tour =

Heavy metal concert tour

- Tour by Slayer, Lamb of God, Mastodon, Children of Bodom, In Flames and Thine Eyes Bleed
- Start date: June 15, 2006
- End date: November 20, 2006
- Legs: 3

The Unholy Alliance Tour was a biennial heavy metal concert tour of Europe and North America, with the tag-line "Preaching to the Perverted". The tour is headlined by the thrash metal band Slayer, and featured Trivium, Amon Amarth and Mastodon in its latest edition.

== Europe 2004 ==
The 2004 European edition of the tour featured the following bands: Slayer, Slipknot, Mastodon and Hatebreed.

Typical Slayer Setlist

"Darkness Of Christ [Audio Introduction]

1. "Disciple"
2. "War Ensemble"
3. "At Dawn They Sleep"
4. "Fight Till Death"
5. "Mandatory Suicide"
6. "Hallowed Point"
7. "Dead Skin Mask"
8. "Seasons in the Abyss"
9. "Chemical Warfare"
10. "Hell Awaits"
11. "South of Heaven"
12. "Angel of Death"

Encore:

13. "Postmortem"
14. "Raining Blood"

Typical Slipknot Setlist

"Prelude 3.0" [Audio Introduction]

1. "The Blister Exists"
2. "(sic)"
3. "Disasterpiece"
4. "Three Nil"
5. "Vermilion"
6. "Pulse of the Maggots"
7. "Iowa"
8. "The Heretic Anthem"
9. "Duality"
10. "Spit It Out"

"(515)" [played from tape]

11. "People = Shit"
12. "Wait and Bleed"
13. "Surfacing"

Danger - Keep Away [played from tape]

Typical Mastodon Setlist

1. "Iron Tusk"
2. "March of the Fire Ants"
3. "Where Strides the Behemoth"
4. "I Am Ahab"
5. "Megalodon"
6. "Blood and Thunder"

== North America 2006 ==
The 2006 North American edition of the tour, called "Chapter I", featured the following bands: Slayer as headliners, Lamb of God as "direct support" band, Children of Bodom and Mastodon in rotating slots, Thine Eyes Bleed as opening act. The Vancouver show was filmed for a forthcoming DVD, with camera angles from above the bands and in among the audience. The DVD was released on October 30, 2007.

== Europe 2006 ==
2006 European edition, called "Chapter II", featured the following bands: Slayer as headliners, In Flames as "direct support" band, Children of Bodom and Lamb of God in rotating slots, Thine Eyes Bleed as opening act. The lineup was identical to the American leg except for Mastodon, who were replaced by In Flames. The French group Gojira was the second band to perform in Paris on November 7, 2006.
