= Thine Eyes Bleed =

Canadian melodic death metal band

- Origin: London, Ontario, Canada
- Genres: Melodic death metal, thrash metal
- Years active: 2002–present
- Label: The End Records
- Members: Justin Wolfe; Jeff Phillips; Darryl Stephens; Johnny Araya; Nigel Curley
- Past members: James Reid; David Newell; Luke Husband; Derek Ward

Thine Eyes Bleed is a Canadian melodic death metal band from London, Ontario.

== History ==
Thine Eyes Bleed took part in a US tour in 2004. They released their first album, In the Wake of Separation, in 2005.

Johnny Araya's brother Tom Araya is the bassist and vocalist of the thrash metal band Slayer. The two bands were featured on 2006's The Unholy Alliance tour with Lamb of God, Mastodon and Children of Bodom, and the 2007 Canadian tour.

In April 2008, Thine Eyes Bleed released their follow up album, Thine Eyes Bleed.

Justin Wolfe later became a chef and opened his own restaurant with his brother Gregg.

They performed as the opening act of Slayer's The Unholy Alliance tour in the summer of 2006 in North America, and in autumn in Europe.

Thine Eyes Bleed was managed by Morgan and Mercedes Lander's parents. Their father, Dave Lander, died of a heart attack on August 2, 2008.

== Band members ==
=== Current ===
- Justin Wolfe – lead vocals (2002–present)
- Jeff Phillips – guitars, backing vocals (2002–present)
- Darryl Stephens – drums (2002–present)
- Johnny Araya – bass (2004–present)
- Nigel Curley – guitars (2010–Present)

=== Former ===
- Luke Husband – bass (2002–2004)
- David Newell – guitars (2002–2004)
- Derek Ward – guitars (2004–2006)
- Ryan Tunne – guitars (2006)
- James Reid – guitars (2006–2010)

== Discography ==
- In the Wake of Separation (2005)
- Thine Eyes Bleed (2008)
- The Embers Rise (2011)
