= Criminal Intents/Morning Star =

EP by Dope Stars Inc.
- Released: April 21, 2009
- Recorded: 2008, Subsound Recording Studios, Rome, Italy
- Genres: Industrial; Alternative metal
- Length: 1:06:41
- Labels: Trisol Music Group; Metropolis Records
- Producer: Victor Love

Dope Stars Inc. chronology
Gigahearts (2006)	Criminal Intents/Morning Star (2009)	21st Century Slave (2009)

Criminal Intents/Morning Star is the third EP album by Italian industrial rock band Dope Stars Inc. It was released on April 21, 2009 as an immediate precursor to their third album, 21st Century Slave, which was released exactly three months later on July 21, 2009. Lyrically it focuses on traditional cyberpunk beliefs and themes. Like their previous album and EPs, Criminal Intents/Morning Star was recorded on the Trisol record label, being distributed by them in most of Europe and by Metropolis Records in the United States, Canada and much of the rest of the world. Various other companies have handled distribution in other counties.

Upon release, Criminal Intents/Morning Star garnered more media attention than their previous EPs. This is possibly because the EP was released under a label and more copies were printed than before.

== Background ==
Following the release of their second album, "Gigahearts", Dope Stars began touring extensively from 2006 to 2008. This reportedly gave Victor Love time to write new tracks for a third album. Because Love was busy with other projects and with touring, the album was delayed until 2009. Not wanting to keep fans waiting for more material, Dope Stars decided they would first release a double EP that would preview the full album. The EP, "Criminal Intents/Morning Star" was released on April 21, 2009 as both a digital download and a CD.

As with all other projects of Dope Stars, Victor Love wrote all of the songs for the EP. The tracks "Can You Imagine", "Lost", "Bang Your Head", and "Braindamage" were all taken from their previous album Gigahearts and remixed by various other bands for the EP. The final track on the EP, "Vyperpunk", was taken from their debut album, //Neuromance. On the other hand, a few tracks were taken from the EP and included on their next full album. There were two tracks included, "Digital Warriors" and "Criminal Intents", both of which detail the story arc of the 21st Century Slave's concept of a group of eponymous rebels fighting against a corporation out to rule the world using technology.

Following the release of Criminal Intents, Dope Stars Inc. immediately released their third album, 21st Century Slave. Due to the EP being a precursor to the third album, both pieces share the same lyrical mood and meaning inspired by the cyberpunk writings of author William Gibson.

In 2015 a new version of the EP, Criminal Intents/Morning Star (Unlimited Edition) was released.

== Style ==
The album is enhanced by its grandiose production style. "The two feature songs represent two very opposing songwriting and performance styles, each showcasing the band's balancing act of old-school glam-rock and postmodern synth-driven industrial."

== Critical reception ==
Upon release, Criminal Intents/Morning Star have received overall positive mention from critics as a preview of their next full album. Reviewer Gregory Burkart from FEARnet felt the album was a promising preview of what was to come in their next full album. Burkart noted that the EP had the amount of new content and quality to compare to a full studio album. He felt the track "Criminal Intents" heavily represented electronic influences, "Morning Star" was more involved with synths and vocals, and "Digital Warriors" was a blend of the two styles. Burkart also praised the involvement with other bands of similar genres on certain tracks and called the EP ambitious as a whole. There was no score attached to Burkart's review but he concluded that Dope Stars "have an old-school rock attitude that elevates the material above the average laptop-based, loop-happy industrial act. There's a lot of intriguing promise in this little preview".

A reviewer for Abort magazine also felt the EP was a good preview of future Dope Stars albums. He felt that the track "Morning Star" was an unmistakable hit and that the EP as a whole "feels darker and more monumental, without losing an ounce of their trademark energetics." The reviewer noted that the remix tracks were well done and praised the selection of artists chosen. He concluded by stating "Impeccable production quality, true talent, acknowledgment by the likes of KMFDM, Crossbreed and Mortiis. What else could you want?"

Other reviewers were not as optimistic on certain aspects of the EP. Jacob Wendlandt published a review for Dark Twin Cities that the remixes on the EP were "extremely sub-par and feel uninspired and the handful of other mixes are well done, but ultimately forgettable." Despite this complaint, the review was positive and Wendlandt felt that the even though the tracks performed by the band weren't new sounding, he still felt the tracks were solid. Overall Wendlandt felt the album was strong and recommended buying it as it was "worth every penny".

== Track listing ==
All lyrics are written by Victor Love; all music is composed by Victor Love with cover versions by other bands being noted below

No.	Title	Length
1.	"Criminal Intents"	3:32
2.	"Digital Warriors"	5:26
3.	"Morning Star"	6:07
4.	"Nothing Is Left"	3:20
5.	"Lost (Remixed By KMFDM)"	4:29
6.	"Can You Imagine (Remixed By Gothminister)"	3:43
7.	"Braindamage (Scumsuckers Mix By Mortiis)"	4:44
8.	"Lost (Remixed By The LoveCrave)"	4:20
9.	"Braindamage (Remixed By Deflore)"	3:59
10.	"Can You Imagine (Spiritual Front Cover Version)"	4:29
11.	"Bang Your Head (Remixed By Reverend Hellbastard)"	3:52
12.	"Braindamage (Remixed By Crossbreed)"	4:35
13.	"Can You Imagine (Remixed By Violent Diva)"	5:02
14.	"Jasmine & Rose (Cover Version)"	4:06
15.	"Vyperpunk (Demo Version)"	4:57

Unlimited Edition

No.	Title	Length
1.	"Criminal Intents"	3:33
2.	"Digital Warriors"	5:27
3.	"Morning Star"	6:08
4.	"Nothing Is Left"	3:21
5.	"Lost (Remixed by KMFDM)"	4:29
6.	"Can You Imagine (Remixed By Gothminister)"	3:43
7.	"Braindamage (Scumsuckers Mix By Mortiis)"	4:44
8.	"Bang Your Head (Remixed By Reverend Hellbastard)"	3:53
9.	"Braindamage (Remixed By Crossbreed)"	4:34
10.	"Can You Imagine (Remixed By Violent Diva)"	5:02
11.	"Multiplatform Paradise (Remixed by Latexxx Teens)"	3:15
12.	"Bang Your Head (Remixed by Deflore)"	3:15
13.	"Braindamage (SmashMix by XP8)"	4:52
14.	"Beatcrusher (Remixed by Adam Kult)"	3:41
15.	"Analog God (Previously Unreleased Demo)"	3:23
16.	"34 Hours (Previously Unreleased Demo)"	4:10
17.	"Stay On Your Track (Previously Unreleased Demo)"	2:16
18.	"You Make Me Upset (Previously Unreleased Demo)"	2:46

== Personnel ==
- Victor Love – lead vocals, guitar, synthesizer, drum machine, songwriting, producer
- Fabrice La Nuit – guitar
- Darin Yevonde – bass guitar

== Release history ==
Region	Date	Label	Format
World	April 21, 2009	Metropolis	Digital download
United States	April 21, 2009	Metropolis	CD, Digipack, EP
Canada	April 21, 2009	Metropolis	CD, Digipack, EP
Europe	April 21, 2009	Trisol Music Group	CD, Digipack, EP
Japan	April 21, 2009	Deathwatch Asia	CD, Digipack, EP
Italy	April 21, 2009	Subsound Records	CD, Digipack, EP
