= Neuromance =

Studio album by Dope Stars Inc.
- Released: August 22, 2005
- Recorded: 2003–2005; Subsound Recording Studios, Rome, Italy
- Genres: Industrial metal EBM; Industrial rock
- Length: 59:06
- Labels: Trisol Music Group; Metropolis Records
- Producers: Thomas Rainer; John Fryer; Victor Love

Dope Stars Inc. chronology
10,000 Watts of Artificial Pleasures (2003)	Neuromance (2005)	Make a Star (2006)

Singles from Neuromance
- 1. "I'm Overdriven" Released: February 2004

Neuromance (stylized as ://Neuromance) is the debut studio album by Italian industrial rock band Dope Stars Inc. and is also the first project by the band released under the Trisol Music Group label. Lyrically it focuses on traditional cyberpunk beliefs and themes, the album title itself a play on the Cyberpunk classic Neuromancer. Unlike their previous EP, 10,000 Watts of Artificial Pleasures, which was published by Victor Love, Neuromance was produced by Thomas Rainer and John Fryer. The album was released on August 22, 2005, as a Digipak to coincide with the release of the digital download.

Upon release, Neuromance received positive reviews and has sold out of both the standard edition and the two disc Digipak. Critics consistently praised the quick pace of the tracks and aggressive vocals provided by Victor Love. In addition, critics pointed out the tracks "10.000 Watts" and "Theta Titanium" as being some of the best tracks on the album for different reasons. Despite this, opinions on the remix tracks included on the second disc were mixed.

== Background ==
Following the self-produced and distributed EP 10,000 Watts of Artificial Pleasures, Dope Stars Inc. gained a record deal through Trisol Music Group to release two studio albums. Seeing as Trisol contacted the band from hearing the EP, Dope Stars were surprised at gaining a record deal such a short time after being established. Victor Love immediately wrote songs and the band began recording in Subsound Studios in Rome, Italy in early 2004. The band initially planned a spring 2004 release for the album, but recording pushed the release back to 2005. Due to scheduling, some of the album was even recorded at Victor Love's home and mixed later in the studio. Grace Khold worked with Love to create the album art. The recording wrapped up for the album, initially titled "New Breed of Digital Fuckers" before the band changed the title to "Neuromance", in June 2005.

Victor Love claims that he learned much technically from working with producers Thomas Rainer and John Fryer. Love also stated that during recording, the band chose to reorder and improve tracks right until they wrapped up, making the help of the producers essential to recording. In the same interview, Love commented on having to operate a drum machine for recording and how some of the sound creativity is lost when a real drummer is not present. For this, he intended to get a real drummer for live shows only. Also concerning the band's line-up, Love confirmed that Brian Wolfram did not leave the band, but that they chose Alex Vega of Klimt 1918 to replace him. Regarding Vega, Love also replied that "we've finally found our final line up and he contributed a lot for Neuromance even if he joined so late."

The band's first single, "I'm Overdriven", was filmed at Cinecittà studios with the assistance of N.U.C.T. University. A preview of the music video was available online in January 2004, with the full video being released in February.

The full album was released on August 22, 2005 worldwide in North America, Europe, and Asia. Following the release of Neuromance, the band toured heavily in Europe in support of the album. They attended the M'Era Luna Festival in 2006 along with other festivals to completely sell out the album. After some touring, Dope Stars released a second EP, Make a Star, which consisted of many remixes of the eponymous track included on Neuromance. The band quickly released their second album, Gigahearts in 2006 and continued touring since then.

=== Versions ===
Neuromance has shipped in many forms since its initial release. The original jewel case was released to Europe and North America on August 22, 2005 and contained no more than the disc itself and a booklet. The Italian release was covered by Subsound Records with the rest of Europe being distributed through Trisol Music Group. The tracks were also released globally the same day as a digital download, also through Subsound. The North American version was the same as the European CD and the distribution was handled by Metropolis Records, a correspondent of Trisol. Most of the Asian distribution was handled by minor label Deathwatch Asia. 1000 copies of a special edition two-disc digipack was released with the standard edition and contained both the original disc with all the tracks and an 18-track second disc containing rare cover songs by the band as well as remixes by other bands, a 32-page booklet, a Dope Stars Inc. poster, and a sticker.

== Themes and composition ==
To find the correct combination of sounds and eqs and effects has been not that easy but working with Mr. Rainer and John Fryer we figured out a good cocktail. It has been a great experience where i learnt a lot of new techniques and tricks and we are really satisfied.

— Victor Love, on working with Thomas Rainer and John Fryer in the producing the album

During production, Victor Love wrote 13 songs for the album to follow the theme of "Infection 13". Love stated he was more into the hardcore rock and industrial than the EBM and alternative genres at the time, but blending the genres for the songs were difficult. In addition to having 13 tracks on purpose, the tracks were also divided into three acts: Code Capricorn: Rise Of The Machines, Code Saturn: Ultraviolent E-Volution, and Code Cancer: Epicentre Gigaheartz. The first act, Capricorn, contained six tracks that were meant to be lighter and more dancable to "let the listener enter gradually". The second act, Saturn, contained four tracks with emphasis on guitars and aggressive vocals. In an interview, Love stated that the guitars for album were grittier and inspired by Mötley Crüe. The final act, Cancer, contained the last three tracks that increase the tempo until it fades down on the final track "C-Beams". In addition to separating into three acts for the sound, Love also stated that they divided the songs to fit a trilogy storyline. The trilogy is focused on the tracks "10.000 watts", "Self Destructive Corp." and "Trance-Former", each of which are in separate acts. The tracks tell the story of "an electro dandie and his artificial pleasures, a guy that become so slave of synthetic substitutes of emotions till the point he collapse cause of a synaptic overload."

Despite being Italian, Dope Stars Inc. has recorded all of their songs entirely in English. In a 2009 interview, Victor Love stated the reason for this is that Italian wasn't a good language for their genre and Darin Yevonde added that "The Italian language is only good for Italian poppylovesingsongs!". The one exception to this is the opening track of the album, "10.000 Watts", which is the redone version of the eponymous track of their 2003 debut EP. The track contains a chorus of German: "Ich weil in dieser welt, da es euch so gefallt, eine machinerie, gedopt mit sex chemie" This roughly translates to "Because I am in this world, as it pleases you so, one machine, doped with sex chemistry." Victor Love stated that he put this into the song simply because it sounded cool and it worked with the song.

== Critical reception ==
Professional ratings
Review scores
Source	Rating
Space Junkies Magazine	5/5 stars
Live Journal	4.5/5 stars

Upon release, Neuromance has received positive to acclaimed reviews from critics. Space Junkies Magazine featured a review by Wednesday Elektra in their February issue that gave the album a perfect five out of five. Elektra called the band impressive and said the album "should be dropping like mini A-bombs throughout the world and not too mention hitting dance halls everywhere." Elektra noted the high tempo of the tracks, even on ballad tracks such as "Platinum Girl" and "Make a Star", but felt this was a positive. Elektra concluded by praising the eloquent vocals and stating the album was "definitely worth every penny". Another review from Live Journal gave the album a similar 4.5 out of five. The reviewer dismissed the claim that Dope Stars Inc. is a copy of California band London After Midnight. He also began by pointing out Victor Love's angry and harsh voice and the band's electronic and synth style. He proceeded to call "10.000 Watts" a hit and praised the chorus in German. Other tracks praised were "Infection 13" for the machine-like vocals and "I'm Overdriven". He finished by awarding "Theta Titanium" as the best track on the album for having "PERFECT synthwork and great guitar/vocals."

== Track listing ==
All lyrics are written by Victor Love; all music is composed by Victor Love.

Code Capricorn: Rise Of The Machines
No.	Title	Length
1.	"10.000 Watts"	3:11
2.	"Infection 13"	3:28
3.	"Platinum Girl"	3:35
4.	"Make a Star"	4:52
5.	"Vyperpunk"	4:00
6.	"Generation Plastic"	5:02

Code Saturn: Ultraviolent E-Volution
No.	Title	Length
7.	"Rebel Riot"	4:42
8.	"Theta Titanium"	6:23
9.	"Self Destructive Corp."	4:14
10.	"Plug'N'Die"	6:13

Code Cancer: Epicentre Gigaheartz
No.	Title	Length
11.	"Defcon 5"	4:28
12.	"Trance-Former"	4:09
13.	"C-Beams"	4:49
Total length:		59:06

=== Bonus CD tracks ===
All lyrics are written by Victor Love; all music is composed by Dope Stars Inc., except where noted.

Double CD Digipack - Disc Two
No.	Title	Length
1.	"I'm Overdriven"	4:15
2.	"Kiss" (London After Midnight cover)	5:10
3.	"Right Here in My Arms" (HIM cover)	4:03
4.	"10.000 Watts" (remix by Funker Vogt)	4:09
5.	"Vyperpunk" (remix by Deathstars)	3:57
6.	"Make a Star (Siderartica version)" (cover by Siderartica)	3:54
7.	"Self Destructive Corp. (Midnight Mass remix)" (remix by Mortiis)	4:23
8.	"10.000 Watts" (remix by Punto Omega)	4:30
9.	"Generation Plastic" (remix by Carmilla)	5:34
10.	"Make a Star (Maximegalon remix)" (remix by High Level Static)	4:14
11.	"10.000 Watts (Flatline remix)" (remix by Needleye)	3:11
12.	"Make a Star" (remix by Esoterica)	3:41
13.	"Plug'n'Die" (remix by Underwater Pilots)	8:02
14.	"Make a Star (Panzer edit)" (remix by Sundealers)	4:10
15.	"Platinum Girl" (remix by Endraum)	3:28
16.	"Infection 13" (remix by DJmO featuring Stephanie Luzie)	3:35
17.	"Generation Plastic (Decaydance remix)" (remix by Pilori)	4:04
18.	"Vyperpunk (Spiritual Front version)" (cover by Spiritual Front)	3:55
Total length:		1:17:55

== Personnel ==
Band

- Victor Love – lead vocals, guitar, synthesizers, drum machine
- Alex Vega – guitar
- Darin Yevonde – bass guitar
- Grace Khold – artwork

Production

- John Fryer – producer
- Victor Love – songwriting, producer
- Thomas Rainer – producer

== Release history ==
Region	Date	Label	Format
World	August 22, 2005	Metropolis	Digital download
United States	August 22, 2005	Metropolis	CD, Digipack
Canada	August 22, 2005	Metropolis	CD, Digipack
Europe	August 22, 2005	Trisol Music Group	CD, Digipack
Japan	August 22, 2005	Deathwatch Asia	CD, Digipack
Italy	August 22, 2005	Subsound Records	CD, Digipack
