= Make a Star =

EP by Dope Stars Inc.
- Released: August 4, 2006
- Recorded: 2005–2006, Subsound Studio, Rome, Italy; Studio Jäger/Overall Studio, Vienna, Austria
- Genres: Industrial metal Electronic rock
- Length: 37:28
- Label: Trisol Music Group
- Producers: Markus Jäger; Bernd Mazzagg; Thomas Rainer

Dope Stars Inc. chronology
//Neuromance (2005)	Make a Star (2006)	Gigahearts (2006)

Singles from Make a Star
- 1. "Make a Star (Saw Edit)" Released: October 25, 2005

Make a Star is the second EP album by Italian industrial rock band Dope Stars Inc. It was released on August 4, 2006. Following suit of their previous albums, the EP was released under the Trisol Music Group label as well as being distributed by Metropolis Records in North America and Canada, with other labels distributing in other countries. Thomas Rainer, who produced their last album, returned to produce along with Bernd Mazzagg and Markus Jäger.

== Background ==
Following the release of Make a Star, Dope Stars Inc. were already signed for a record deal with Trisol Music Group to produce one more album. The album, Gigahearts, was recorded shortly after and released later in 2006. Rather than keeping Thomas Rainer as a producer for a third time, Victor Love used his knowledge gained from working with him to produce the album himself.

== Track listing ==
All lyrics are written by Victor Love; all music is composed by Victor Love except where noted.

No.	Title	Length
1.	"Make a Star"	4:01
2.	"Digital Freedom"	3:30
3.	"Fast & Beautiful"	3:11
4.	"Nuclear Decay"	3:28
5.	"Chase the Light"	3:53
6.	"Make a Star (After Party Mix By The Birthday Massacre)"	4:33
7.	"Make a Star (L'âme Immortelle vs Fr!ek Remix)"	4:38
8.	"Make a Star (Extended Version)"	4:52
9.	"Theta Titanium (Samsas Traum Remix)"	5:22

== Personnel ==
Creative personnel us as follows:

Band
- Victor Love – lead vocals, guitar, drum machine, synthesizer
- Alex Vega – guitar
- Darin Yevonde – bass guitar
- Grace Khold – artwork

Extra instruments

- Markus Jäger – bass guitar, guitar
- Alexander Kaschte – guitar
- Thomas Rainer – Male vocals
- Luisa Thum – Female vocals

Production

- Markus Jäger – producer, recording
- Alexander Kaschte – composer, programming, mixing
- Bo Kondren – mastering
- Victor Love – songwriting, mixing, recording, programming
- Bernd Mazzagg – producer, arranging, mixing, programming, recording
- Thomas Rainer – producer

Artwork

- Grace Khold – graphic design, art direction, layout
- Eolo Perfido – photography
