= Soul Saliva =

Studio album by The LoveCrave
- Released: 14 May 2010
- Recorded: December 2009
- Genre: Gothic metal, gothic rock
- Length: 46:25
- Label: Repo Records; Alive Records

The LoveCrave chronology
The Angel and the Rain (2006)	Soul Saliva (2010)

Soul Saliva is the second album by Italian gothic metal band The LoveCrave.

== Reception ==
The songs was recorded in December 2009 at Musicay Studio and Remaster Studio. The first single which was released over his MySpace page was the Cover of Michael Jacksons cult song Thriller.

=== Release ===
Soul Saliva was released after three years hard work on 14 May 2010. The US release over Alive Records is set for 24 August 2010. The band promoted and released the album in the United Kingdom on 14 May 2010 as part of his concert in Camden Underworld in London.

== Track listing ==
No.	Title	Length
1.	"The Other You"	6:14
2.	"And Scream"	4:24
3.	"Warriors"	4:17
4.	"Fade"	4:59
5.	"Get Outta Here"	4:34
6.	"Thriller" (Michael Jackson Cover)	4:35
7.	"Your Fire"	4:06
8.	"Leon's Lullaby"	3:59
9.	"Tru Blood"	4:02
10.	"Outsider"	4:23

== Personnel ==
- Francesca Chiara - whispering and screams
- Tank Palamara - guitar
- Simon Dredo - bass guitar
- Bob Parolin - drums
