= 10.000 Watts of Artificial Pleasures =

EP by Dope Stars Inc.
- Released: 2003
- Recorded: 2003
- Genre: Industrial
- Length: 27:15
- Label: No label
- Producer: Victor Love

Dope Stars Inc. chronology
10.000 Watts of Artificial Pleasures (2003)	//Neuromance (2005)

10,000 Watts of Artificial Pleasures (often stylized as 10.000 Watts of Artificial Pleasures) is the debut EP, as well as the very first project by Italian industrial rock band Dope Stars Inc. It was released periodically throughout 2003. Being self-produced and distributed, the band created a street team to sell copies of the album in order to get the attention of labels for future projects. Copies of the EP sold out quickly and boosted the band's reputation into gaining a record deal with Trisol Music Group.

== Background ==
Upon forming the band, Victor Love began recording an EP for their new band. Grace, Brian and Darin joined just after to assist with the demo. It was recorded in Rome, Italy, inside a basement the band had used in practices. 10.000 Watts was written and recorded in early May 2003 and was finished within a few weeks. Initially, the band had wanted to spend more time on mixing and perfecting the album but felt that the version they had was surprisingly satisfying for them so they chose to release it immediately. Commenting on the recording and release of the EP, Victor Love has stated that "we decided to release it as soon as possible without spending time on further arrangements and fixes on the production side. The result was a really dirty EP with a lot of passion and roughness. And I believe it has been the key of its success too, the reason why we received suddenly a very big feedback from media and people. It was really independent and genuine -- really rock'n'roll."

The demo was first shipped to media reviewers and magazines in mid-2003. Soon after, the album went on sale on the band's online store and had a limited release of a CD that had been professionally pressed by the band. A street team, Theta Division Corp., was set up to sell the EP and spread the word to others. Using this method of distribution rather than a label allowed them to recoup every bit of money they spent producing it themselves. Victor Love also said they didn't want a label for their first project because "any label will never care about you if they didn't hear your name somewhere else." Weeks after release, the band had sold out of all copies of the CD. Instead of reprinting more, the band re-recorded every track except the Billy Idol cover "Shock to the System" for their full debut album.

Following the release of 10,000 Watts, Dope Stars Inc. immediately signed a record deal with Trisol Music Group to produce two albums. From 2005–2006, the band released the albums, Neuromance and Gigahearts, both of which received positive reviews from critics.

== Critical reception ==
Professional ratings
Review scores
Source	Rating
Alunos	7/10
Metal.de	6/10
Alternation	75%

Despite not being published by a label as well as being a debut project by a band, 10.000 Watts has received many reviews from critics. Overall, the reviews for the album were mixed. David Butler Manning wrote a review for Alunos that gave the album a 7/10. Butler felt that Dope Stars were heavily influenced by Deathstars and Marilyn Manson, going as far to say "you'd be hard pressed to tell one band from another." He felt that every track except "Generation Plastic" was catchy and well written. Another review from Alternation gave the album a 75% rating citing that "the musicians couldn't make up their minds as to the amount of electronics they should include in their tracks." Still, the reviewer felt it was a good album with a punk style. He did feel that the low sound quality of the album was an issue but it was a good start for the band.

== Track listing ==
All lyrics are written by Victor Love, except track five; all music is composed by Victor Love.

No.	Title	Length
1.	"10.000 Watts of Artificial Pleasures"	4:21
2.	"Plug 'N' Die"	6:23
3.	"Infection 13"	3:31
4.	"Self Destructive Corp"	4:16
5.	"Shock to the System (Billy Idol Cover)"	3:45
6.	"Generation Plastic"	4:53

== Personnel ==
- Victor Love – lead vocals, guitar, synthesizer, drum machine, songwriting, producer
- Brian Wolfram – guitar
- Darin Yevonde – bass guitar
- Grace Khold – artwork
