= Criminal intent =

Criminal intent refers to intention (criminal law), the subjective purpose or goal that must be proven along with criminal acts.

It may also refer to:

- Law & Order: Criminal Intent, American television series
- Criminal Intents/Morning Star, a 2009 EP by Dope Stars Inc.
- "Criminal Intent", a song by Robyn from the album Body Talk Pt. 2
- Gang Related, a 1997 film also known as Criminal Intent
