= Gigahearts =

Studio album by Dope Stars Inc.
- Released: November 17, 2006
- Recorded: 2006
- Genres: Industrial metal EBM; Industrial rock Electronic rock
- Length: 42:48
- Labels: Trisol Music Group; Metropolis Records
- Producer: Victor Love

Dope Stars Inc. chronology
Make a Star (2006)	Gigahearts (2006)	Criminal Intents/Morning Star (2009)

Singles from Gigahearts
- 1. "Beatcrusher" Released: October 23, 2007

Gigahearts is the second studio album by Italian industrial rock band Dope Stars Inc. Lyrically it focuses on traditional cyberpunk beliefs and themes. The album was released in 2006 first in Europe and in other countries including North America and Australia in the following weeks. Like Dope Stars' previous album and EPs, Gigahearts was recorded on the Trisol record label and distributed by them in most of Europe, while Metropolis Records was the distributor in the United States, Canada and much of the rest of the world. Other companies have handled distribution in some counties.

Upon release, Gigahearts garnered media attention for Dope Stars as one of the few industrial acts in Italy.

== Background ==
Following the release of their debut album, Neuromance, Dope Stars had plans to release a follow-up album immediately. The band had already signed a two-album contract with Trisol Music Group and they chose to keep the label for the new album. The band also decided to record again in Subsound Recording Studios in Rome, Italy. Gigahearts was recorded during the early months of 2006. Dope stars' lead singer and Gigaheart's producer, Victor Love stated that his experience of recording and producing tracks gave him the knowledge that enabled him to produce the album. He said that working with Neuromance producers Thomas Rainer and John Fryer gave him the opportunity to develop methods to guide tracks for the album as well as produce. Love felt that being able to produce the album himself gave the band a creative hold on the sound of the album and allowed them to convey the mood he had intended while writing the tracks.

Commenting on the role of songs on the album and their recording process, Love stated "It is really important in my opinion that each song should have its special role inside an album and should focus on a particular song idea. This idea should be expressed clearly and should not get lost in details to help the listener to focus on it and understand the feeling that inspired it. Also the production in this sense play a main role, cause each good production should look at the essence of a song and should make its best to put it in vivid light."

As with all other projects of Dope Stars, Victor Love wrote most of the songs for the album in one day. Love said the band spent more time in the studio than with their first album, and greater emphasis on production enhanced the ultimate effect. A single, "Beatcrusher", was chosen to be included on the Saw IV soundtrack, This was following the band's inclusion on previous Saw film soundtracks.

Following the release of Gigahearts, Dope Stars Inc. toured extensively to promote the album until 2008 when they began focusing on writing new songs. They have since released a third EP album titled Criminal Intents/Morning Star which was a precursor to the announcement of the planned release of their third album, 21st Century Slave.

== Themes and composition ==
As with all of their albums, Gigahearts maintains the theme of technology and human beings interacting. The album title itself is a play on words of the computer term "Gigahertz" combining with "Hearts". The songs themselves take the same lyrical influences with instrument pieces being influenced by 80s Glam Rock and electronica. Victor Love describes the album as "11 tracks to kick your ass very bad but also to satisfy your desire of melodies and electronic exploration."

The album was a significant milestone in the evolution of Dope Stars Inc.’s sound. Love stated the band had wanted to give a specific character and style to each song in line with their goal to complete the range of the band's sound, and to keep the arrangements "clear and direct" with less use of synths than on Neuromance.

== Critical reception ==
Professional ratings
Review scores
Source	Rating
The Metal List	4.5/5 stars
Side-Line	(8/10)
Metal Glory	4/5 stars

Professional reviews for Gigahearts have been limited. A critic from The Metal List, McAllen, gave the album a nine out of ten. The reviewer cited the strong lyrics of the songs as a bonus. In addition, McAllen praised the guitar solos and the feel of American Alternative music on the tracks. Another reviewer for Side-Line called Dope Stars "One of the best recent discoveries from the great Trisol label" and felt the new album would not disappoint fans. The reviewer felt the album stayed consistent with the band's established sound and noted the variety in the tracks moods from upbeat to aggressive as a positive. He also felt the electronic mixing and vocals were a high point of the album. The review concluded with a comment calling the album passionate and refreshing, and described the band as "the new generation of what Goth means in the 21st century" and gave the album an overall eight out of ten. A review by Metal Glory gave the album a very positive review of four out of five stars. The reviewer praised the varying tones of the songs while all of them are still able to be danced to. Labeling the band as "Gothic Industrial rock", the reviewer pointed out that while not all metal fans may like the album, fans of artists like Rob Zombie or Peter Tägtgren will like it.

== Track listing ==
All lyrics are written by Victor Love; all music is composed by Victor Love.

No.	Title	Length
1.	"Multiplatform Paradise"	3:06
2.	"Beatcrusher"	3:32
3.	"Braindamage"	4:47
4.	"Lost"	4:24
5.	"Can You Imagine"	4:13
6.	"Play 'N' Kill"	4:47
7.	"Bang Your Head"	2:58
8.	"Just the Same for You"	4:30
9.	"Technologic Age"	3:03
10.	"Citizen XT99"	4:23
11.	"Critical World"	3:05

== Personnel ==
Creative personnel as follows:

Band

- Victor Love – lead vocals, guitar, synthesizer, programming, songwriting
- Grace Khold – artwork
- Alex Vega – guitar
- Darin Yevonde – bass guitar

Production

- Victor Love – producer, programming, arrangements, mixing, recording
- Andrea Secchi – mixing engineer
- Vincent Sorg – mastering

Artwork

- Grace Khold – design

== Release history ==
Region	Date	Label	Format
World	November 17, 2006	Metropolis	Digital download
United States	November 17, 2006	Metropolis	CD, Digipack
Canada	November 17, 2006	Metropolis	CD, Digipack
Europe	November 17, 2006	Trisol Music Group	CD, Digipack
Japan	November 17, 2006	Deathwatch Asia	CD, Digipack
Italy	November 17, 2006	Subsound Records	CD, Digipack
