= Sentimentale Jugend =

Sentimentale Jugend (German for: sentimental youth) may refer to:

- Sentimentale Jugend (band), a 1980s music project by Christiane F. and Alexander Hacke
- Sentimentale Jugend (album), a 2016 double-album by Italian shoegaze band Klimt 1918
