= Dust of Basement =

The Dust of Basement
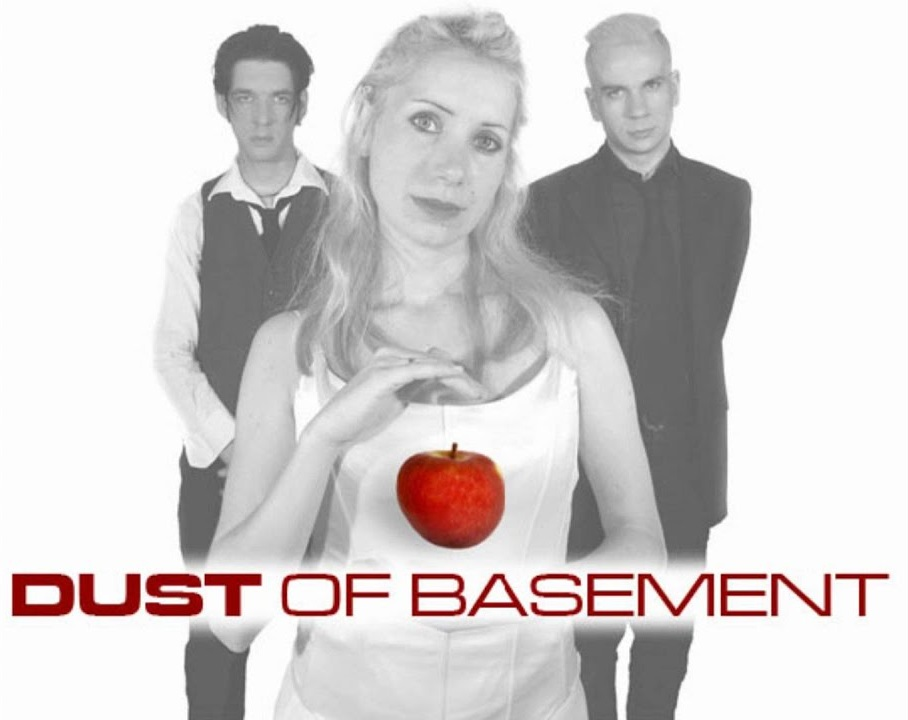

Background information
- Origin: Germany
- Genres: EBM, Synthpop
- Years active: 1991–2006
- Labels: Trisol, Matrix Cube, Khazad-Dûm, Side-Line Records
- Members: Birgitta Behr Sven Wolff Peer Lebrecht
- Past members: Axel Schmieder Eric Bahrs M.S.

Dust of Basement was an electronic music band originally from Berlin, formed in 1991. They combine elements of electro-industrial music and gothic pop. The final members were Sven Wolff, Birgitta Behr and Peer Lebrecht. They officially disbanded in 2006, their last performance being a farewell concert at the Berlin club K17, on December 9.

Birgitta Behr was the female voice of Dust Of Basement since 1993. She wrote the lyrics for the "Come With Me" album. Her paintings are part of many Dust of Basement CD artworks.

Sven Wolff entered Dust of Basement in 1992. He composed and produced all music of Dust Of Basement. Live he is playing the keyboards. His current project is Patenbrigade: Wolff.

Peer Lebrecht became the new vocalist in 2003. Since the "Home Coming Heavens" CD he wrote the lyrics for Dust Of Basement.

== Discography ==
- 1995 - Regress [EP]
- 1996 - Words of God [MCD]
- 1997 - Remembrances [CD]
- 1998 - Re-membrances [CD]
- 1999 - Opticus Vice Versa[CD]
- 2001 - Come with me... [CD]
- 2002 - Five become Two [Double CD]
- 2003 - Home Coming Heavens [CD]
- 2004 - Awakening the Oceans [Double CD]
- 2005 - Meridian [Double CD]
