= Just in Case We'll Never Meet Again (Soundtrack for the Cassette Generation) =

Studio album by Klimt 1918
- Released: 2008
- Genre: Alternative rock Indie rock Shoegaze
- Length: 50:07
- Label: Prophecy Productions

Klimt 1918 chronology
Dopoguerra (2005)	Just in Case We'll Never Meet Again (Soundtrack for the Cassette Generation) (2008)	Sentimentale Jugend (2016)

Just In Case We'll Never Meet Again (Soundtrack For The Cassette Generation) is an album by Italian rock band Klimt 1918, released in June 2008.

Metal Storm described it as "not an album for every metalheads but it's highly recommended to all the people who loves the new wave of (dark) Rock bands."

== Track listing ==
Just In Case We'll Never Meet Again track listing
No.	Title	Length
1.	"The Breathtaking Days (Via Lactea)"	3:40
2.	"Skygazer"	4:45
3.	"Ghost Of A Tape Listener"	4:39
4.	"The Graduate"	5:58
5.	"Just An Interlude In Your Life"	5:27
6.	"Just In Case We’ll Never Meet Again"	3:47
7.	"Suspense Music"	4:02
8.	"Disco Awayness"	4:06
9.	"Atget"	4:56
10.	"All Summer Long"	4:33
11.	"True Love Is The Oldest Fear"	4:14
Total length:		50:17

== Personnel ==
- Marco Soellner – vocals, guitar
- Francesco Conte – guitar
- Davide Pesola– bass
- Paolo Soellner – drums
