= Alex Vega =

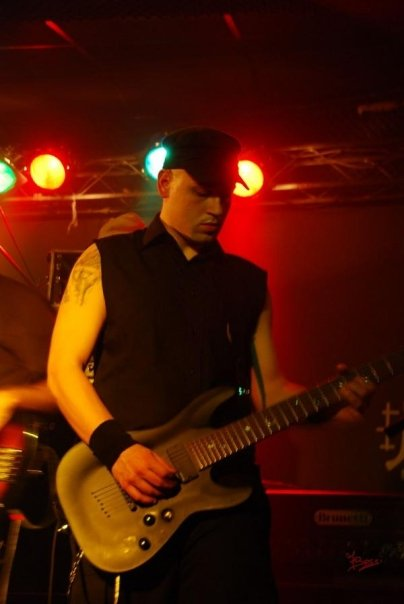
- Vega in 2010

Background information
- Born: Alessandro Pace; 20 May 1977 (age 49); Rome, Italy
- Genres: Gothic metal, doom metal industrial rock, alternative rock, industrial metal, synthpop, neofolk, electronic
- Occupations: Musician, DJ
- Instrument: Guitar
- Years active: 1992–present
- Label: Cyclone Empire Records
- Formerly of: The Foreshadowing (2005-present); Spiritual Front (2001-2004); Klimt 1918 (2002-2006); Dope Stars Inc. (2005–2007)

Alessandro Pace (born 20 May 1977), better known by his stage name Alex Vega, is an Italian musician and part-time DJ. Founder of the musical project The Foreshadowing, he was previously associated with the bands Dope Stars Inc. and Klimt 1918. Pace assumed the name Alex Vega in 2005 when he joined Dope Stars Inc. as a replacement guitarist for Brian Wolfram. Pace left Dope Stars in 2007 and left an earlier project, Klimt 1918, a year earlier in 2006. Currently, Pace is only involved in his own band The Foreshadowing.

== Biography ==
Pace was born on 20 May 1977 in Rome, Italy. He grew up there where he began playing guitar casually in death metal bands in the early 1990s. In 1996 he joined the band Spiritual Ceremony until he quit soon after. He soon began writing his own songs for an unnamed doom metal and gothic band which never got past development stages due to trouble with finding band members. In 2001, Pace joined Spiritual Front as guitarist. He got to play live shows with them and he felt it was a good learning experience. He recorded a 7” EP with Hauruck and a split EP with Ordo Rosarius Equilibrio until he joined Klimt 1918 in April 2002.

Pace left Spiritual Front in 2003 and went on to record two studio albums with Klimt 1918; Undressed Momento in 2003 and Dopoguerra in 2005. Also in late 2004, Vittorio D'Amore, lead singer of Dope Stars Inc. and friend of Pace through other bands, asked Pace to join the band as a replacement guitarist for former member Brian Wolfram. Pace agreed and finished up recording for their debut album, Neuromance, which released in mid-2005. Love stated that Wolfram did not quit but that they wanted a new guitarist and that Pace completed the line-up and that "he contributed a lot for Neuromance even if he joined so late." With Dope Stars, Pace assumed the stage name Alex Vega that would stick with him during his time with the band.

Pace kept with Klimt 1918 until 2006 where he quit and became exclusive to Dope Stars. He then recorded the EP Make a Star and the full album Gigahearts with them, both of which released in 2006. In 2007, soon after the release of Gigahearts, Pace left Dope Stars Inc. for "personal reasons" Meanwhile, The Foreshadowing, a band that Pace had begun in 1997 but never officially formed joined together in 2006 and have since released a full album, Days of Nothing, have recently finished to work on their second album, Oionos, which has been released in April 2010. Pace is now a part-time disc jockey and plays exclusively for The Foreshadowing.

== Discography ==
With Spiritual Front:

- No Kisses on the Mouth – (Hau Ruck! 2003)
- Satyriasis – (Cold Meat Industry 2005)
- Angel of Ashes: a Tribute to Scott Walker – 2006

With Dope Stars Inc.:

- Neuromance (Trisol Music Group 2005)
- Make a Star (Trisol Music Group 2006)
- Gigahearts (Trisol Music Group 2006)

With Klimt 1918:

- Undressed Momento (My Kingdom Music 2003)
- Dopoguerra (Prophecy Productions 2005)

With The Foreshadowing:

- Days of Nothing – (Candlelight Records 2007)
- Oionos – (Cyclone Empire Records / Metal Blade USA 2010)
- Second World – (Cyclone Empire Records / Metal Blade USA 2012)
- Seven Heads Ten Horns – (Cyclone Empire Records / Metal Blade USA 2016)
