= The Angel and the Rain =

The Angel And The Rain

Studio album by The LoveCrave
- Released: October 23, 2006
- Recorded: 2005–2006
- Genre: Gothic metal, Gothic rock
- Length: 43:20
- Label: Repo Records; Alive Records

The LoveCrave chronology
The Angel And The Rain (2006)	Soul Saliva (2010)

Professional ratings
Review scores
Source	Rating
metal.de	(not rated)
laut.de	(not rated)

The Angel and the Rain is the debut album of the Italian Gothic metal band, The LoveCrave. It was released in 2006 by Repo Records and in America by Alive Records.

== History ==
The album was in 2006 at rockeyez.com in the 10 best-selling releases of the year.

== Style ==
The Italian quartet, led by frontwoman Francesca Chiara and collaborated on with songwriter/producer Tank Palamara, presents ten songs on their debut album. The band dedicated their focus to "fusing electronic and pop-rock melodies". They also admit the influence of the Finnish band, "Nightwish", particularly on the song "Nobody". The album's melodic quality, according to the band, is partially owed to Chiara, being a "quite passable and interesting singer at work[...] the woman is a lot of fun to listen to". "For some, "The Angel and the Rain" may be too sweet, too sticky. But if you don't mind having to share your music with a few little girls who also scream at other music, you'll get a couple of passable songs here." they remark, when describing the reception the public may have to their style

== Track list ==
No.	Title	Length
1.	"Vampires (The Light That We Are)"	5:12
2.	"Nobody"	4:05
3.	"Little Suicide"	3:50
4.	"Can You Hear Me"	5:36
5.	"Fading Roses"	3:40
6.	"My Soul"	4:13
7.	"Runaway"	3:30
8.	"The Angel And The Rain"	4:03
9.	"The Chauffeur" (Duran Duran Cover)	3:39
10.	"Dark City"	3:55

== Single declutching ==
- 2006 – Zilloscope 11/06 (ZILLO mag – DE) – "Little Suicide"
- 2006 – Cold Hands Seduction Vol.64 (SONIC SEDUCER mag – DE) – "Vampires (The Light That We Are)"
- 2006 – Loud Sounds (ROCK HARD mag – ITA) – "Nobody"
- 2006 – ClubTRAX Vol. 2 Double CD (XtraX store – DE) – "Little Suicide"
- 2007 – Rock Sound Magazine Collection 103 (ROCK SOUND mag – ITA) – "Can You Hear Me?"
- 2007 – Gothic Magazine Compilation – "Can You Hear Me?"
- 2007 – Summer Darkness 07 (ZILLO mag – DE) – "Can You Hear Me?"
- 2007 – Fuck The Mainstream – "Little Suicide"

== Credits ==
- Francesca Chiara – whispering and screams
- Tank Palamara – guitar
- Simon Dredo – bass guitar
- Iakk – drums
