= Santa Hates You =

German-Italian musical group

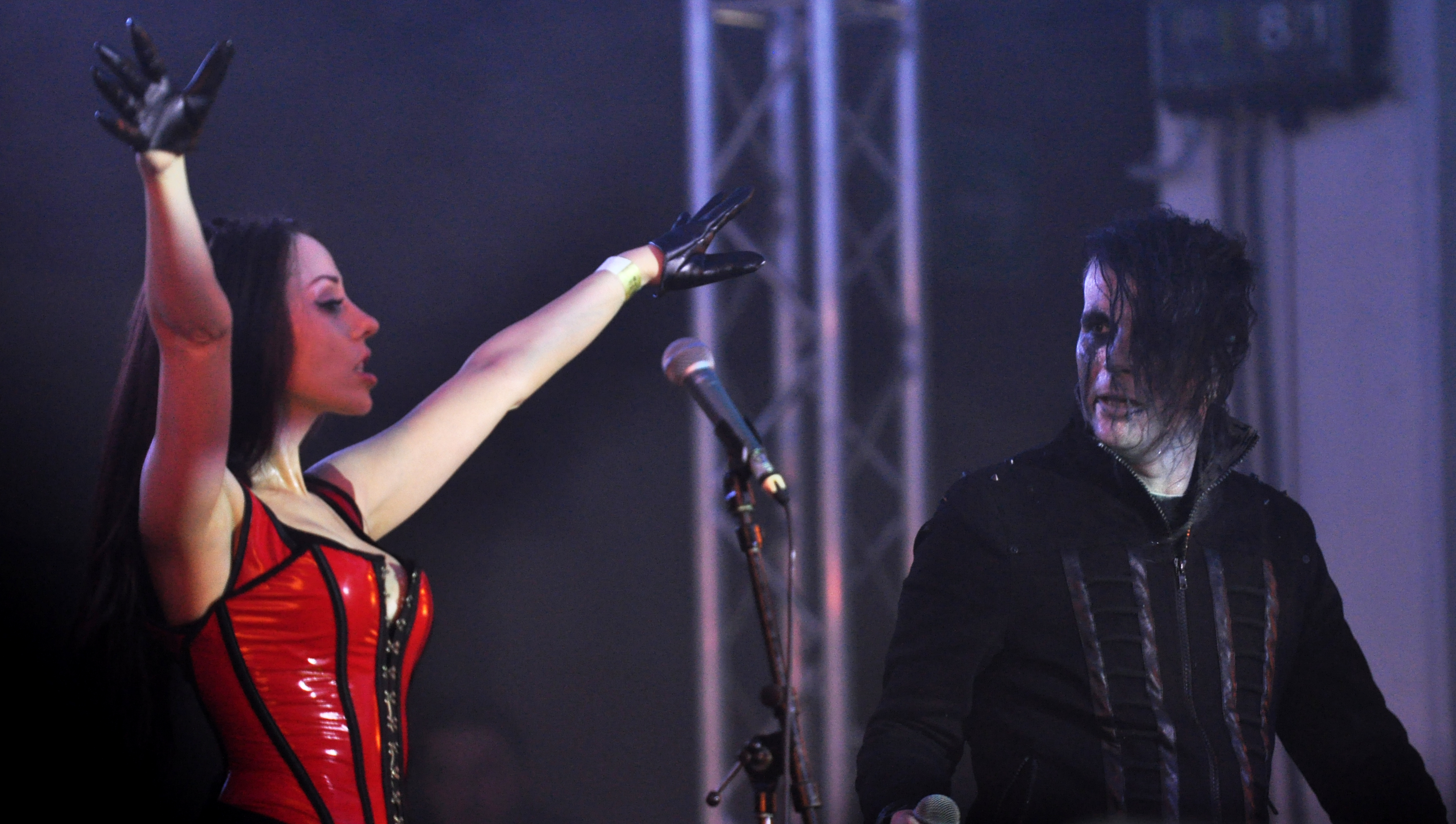
- Santa Hates You at the Amphi Festival 2013, Cologne, Germany

Background information
- Origin: German/Italian
- Genres: Metal, rock, aggrotech, EBM, electropunk
- Years active: 2007–2016
- Labels: Candyland Entertainment (2007), Trisol Music Group (2009 - 2016)
- Members: Jinxy; Peter Spilles

Santa Hates You was a German/Italian band formed in 2007. The two band members were Italian vocalist Jinxy and the frontman of Project Pitchfork, Peter Spilles, credited as PS. Both Jinxy and Spilles shared a passion for dark music, rebellious humour and macabre arts.

== History ==
One of the stranger aspects of the band was their habit to exclusively work at night. The band was influenced by late 19th century and early 20th century art and literature as well as movements such as Symbolism, Surrealism and the Decadent Movement. This passion for different perspectives and psychological approaches became a foundational element in their creative process.

== Band members ==
- Jinxy: lyricist, vocalist, growler/singer, creative concept ideator (2007–2016)
- Peter "PS" Spilles: composer, producer, arranger, synths, vocals (2007–2016)

== Discography ==
Santahatesyou discography
- Studio albums: 4
- EPs: 2
- Music videos: 5

=== Studio albums ===
Title	Album details
It's ALIVE!	Released: September 28, 2012; Formats: CD, digital download; Label: Trisol Music Group
Jolly Roger	Released: August 12, 2011; Format: CD, digital download; Label: Trisol Music Group
Post Apocalyptic Nude Industrial Corps	Released: November 26, 2010; Format: CD, digital download; Label: Trisol Music Group
Crucifix Powerbomb	Released: February 19, 2010; Format: CD, digital download; Label: Trisol Music Group
Rocket Heart	Released: December 4, 2009; Format: CD, digital download; Label: Trisol Music Group
You're On The Naughty List	Released: October 31, 2007; Format: CD, digital download; Label: Candyland Entertainment

=== Collaborations ===
Title	Album details
2011 - "Du Stirbst Aus! Feat. PS + Jinxy From Santa Hates You)" on the Album "Mainstream Sellout Overground" by the band Straftanz	Released: 15 May 2009; Formats: CD, digital download; Label: Scanner (Broken Silence)
2011 - "Conquer" on the Album "Journey" by the band IMATEM	Released: 15 May 2009; Formats: CD, digital download; Label: Prussia Records (rough trade)

=== Music videos ===
Official YouTube channel

Year	Title
2009	Rocket Heart
2010	Hexenpolizei
2011	Raise the Devil
2012	Nothing's Gonna Be Alright
2012	Scum
