= 21st Century Slave =

Studio album by Dope Stars Inc.
- Released: July 14, 2009
- Recorded: 2008–2009; Subsound Recording Studios, Rome, Italy
- Genres: Industrial metal, industrial rock
- Length: 52:35
- Labels: Trisol Music Group; Metropolis Records
- Producer: Victor Love

Dope Stars Inc. chronology
Criminal Intents/Morning Star (2009)	21st Century Slave (2009)	Ultrawired (2011)

Singles from 21st Century Slave
- 1. "Criminal Intents" Released: April 20, 2009; 2. "Digital Warriors" Released: April 20, 2009; 3. "It's Today" Released: February 10, 2010

21st Century Slave is the third studio album by Italian industrial rock band Dope Stars Inc. and has been considered a big step in the industrial metal and electronica genre. Lyrically it focuses on traditional cyberpunk beliefs and themes. Similar to many of their previous albums and EPs, 21st Century Slave was produced by Victor Love.

Upon release, 21st Century Slave garnered more media attention than Dope Stars previous albums, receiving some positive reviews with several critics complementing the album's loud guitars and use of instruments, although opinions on the singing of lead vocalist Victor Love were mixed. The technological revolution themes and lyrics inspired by a dystopian future were also praised as being deeper than many other bands of the genre.

The album was released on July 14, 2009, in Europe, with other countries including North America and Australia being released in the following week on July 21. The album was recorded on the Trisol record label, being distributed by them in most of Europe and by Metropolis Records in the United States, Canada and much of the rest of the world. Various companies have handled distribution in other counties.

== Background ==
Dope Stars' third album and a third EP were both in production for over two years, the longest gap to date for the band to release music. The band officially announced plans for their third album in May 2009. For their third album, the band once again chose to record in Subsound Studios in Italy and use Trisol Music Group for their European label. In addition, they chose Metropolis Records as their North American and Canadian label, Deathwatch Asia as their Asian label, and a few other labels to distribute the album worldwide. Following extensive touring all over Europe and Asia since 2006, Dope Stars began recording the album in early 2008 and it was released on July 14, 2009. 21st Century Slave was the band's full breakthrough album and has earned mention in the industrial music industry, with much attention being spread online. Two of the tracks for the album, "Criminal Intents" and "Digital Warriors", were available previously on the band's EP Criminal Intents/Morning Star. The EP, which was released exactly three months before 21st Century Slave on April 20, 2009, also included tracks from previous albums.

Following the release of 21st Century Slave, Dope Stars Inc. has released a compilation album titled Subversive Industrial Assault through Subsound Records that features them as well as other artists including: Epochate, Deflore, Aquefrigide, Mithra, Richard Christ, Nonlinear System Theory, Neon Synthesis, and Kardia. Concerning future projects exclusive to the band, no one has commented yet on a fourth album or EP, but they are expected to begin working on future projects sometime in 2010. Rather than continuing to use a drum machine for albums and live performances, the band is planning to hire a real drummer for their future projects.

=== Versions ===
The album was first released in Europe and North American and Australian releases followed, along with other minor releases. The European and Italian versions of the album included artwork and lyric booklets. The North American and Japanese versions also included booklets, but with varying content. In addition, the North American version got a special edition jewel case with an exclusive 16-page booklet. All versions were released in July 2009, with the first edition being July 21.

== Themes and composition ==
21st Century Slave continues the cyberpunk style of its immediate predecessor, Criminal Intents/Morning Star. The album includes eleven tracks, two of which were included on their previous EP. It is a concept album that follows the narrative of a dystopian future in which the world population are subject to large-scale brainwashing by corporate leaders. The seventh track, "Megacorps", is titled after the dictatorship which afflicts the impressionable people and exposes them to propaganda. Later tracks detail the uprising of an "underground network of cyber-rebels" who attempt to stop Megacorps from taking over the minds of the "sheeple" of the world. This concept story is heavily influenced by the cyberpunk writings of William Gibson and his series of novels based on similar technological dependence.

The album's attempt to tell a tale and keep the mood constant has led it to be described as "the band’s most ambitious project to date" by Fearnet. They also noted the dark tale of the album being influenced by science fiction films such as Blade Runner. Dope Stars describes their album as "A new manifesto for Digital Warriors, Outlaw Technologists and Console Riders of the 21st Century."

The tracks themselves continue with the blend of electronic, industrial, and rock music that carry over from Dope Stars previous albums. Also, the band has continued their influence from 80's Glam Rock and However, the album has shifted farther from electronica and more over to metal with emphasis on guitar sounds.

Intermixed within the album are occasional rock ballads that are a considerably lighter tone than the rest of the tracks. FEARnet coined the name "Cyberpunk ballads" for tracks of this type. These tracks however, still maintain the synth and beats from other songs. For the first time on any album or EP, Dope Stars Inc. has included a track composed of nothing but acoustic instruments. The track, "It's For You", was considered as an experiment by the band members and did not note it as a shift in their genre. Commenting on the track and the effect it may have on their fans, Victor Love stated,

"I don’t think one song in a set of 11 can be such a scare for the fans, especially considering all the very heavy passages the album got already. The album was originally planned to be a 10-tracks album but then we decided that we wanted to give a try with an acoustic track that could leave space for a totally new experiment. Of course, an acoustic track can be something that deals with an hard sound and leaves an impact anyway so when I was writing it I just tried to imagine an acoustic experiment that could include both the usual vocal style of our more melodic passages and be influenced by both the rock and electronic elements that always characterized our sound. I think that people that like the music as a whole and are not so narrow-minded to give too much importance to clichés or a defender attitude would like this experiment. It is not a song for the hardcore souls but since we already had a lot of tracks in the past with a very pop feeling I think it would not be such a big thing to accept for a large part of our romantic fans."

== Critical reception ==
Professional ratings
Review scores
Source	Rating
Sphere	4/5 stars
ReGen magazine	3/5 stars
Moving Hands Music	6/10 stars

Following the release of their last studio album, Gigahearts, the band was established as the head of the Cyberpunk genre and the Italian industrial scene. This led to the band spending two years for the production and recording of 21st Century Slave, the longest time the band has spent between album releases. After release of 21st Century Slave, the album received much attention from critics. Dom Smith of Sphere magazine praised every track as new ground for the band and compared them as better than industrial metal band Deathstars. Smith also wrote that "While ’21st Century Slave’ doesn't make any major adjustments to DSI's tried and tested formula of monstrous cyberpunk, it's certainly their most vibrant and accessible record to date." Cyberpunk reviewer Mr. Roboto also left a similarly positive review for the album. Roboto felt that the band "pulled out all the stops" for the album and went as far to call it a soundtrack for the Cyberpunk genre and a big influence for it as well. He went on to praise the lyrical meaning of the tracks as well as their relevance to a possible dystopian future. Creating a comparison from Dope Stars to Billy Idol and The Cassandra Complex, Roboto stated that "this is one CD you need to have in your collection, especially if you prefer harder music."

Other reviewers shared many of the same points when reviewing the album. ReGen magazine gave the album a three out of a possible five citing their attempt to appeal to many genres of music as a strength. The reviewer, Andreas Torneberg, felt that Dope Stars was using a blend of guitars and electric beats to gather fans of metal and rock music while still catering to fans of industrial metal and electronica. Torneberg felt the album was ambitious and promising but noted that the tracks were louder than they were unique, resulting in the mediocre score. Reviewer Johannes van der Meer admitted that while he was unfamiliar with the Cyberpunk genre and did not have high expectations, he felt the album was strong and part of an evolving genre in music. Similarly the reviewer for ReGen, Van der Meer felt the mix of rock and electronic elements was a positive and that the overall album was good and "for you open minded people out there who enjoy music to go nuts to. Another plus is if you like both rock/metal and electronic music of course." The resulting score from the review was a six out of a possible ten.

However, not all reviews for the album were as positive. A review from Heathen Harvest did not indicate an overall score for the album but expressed dislike for the commercial feel of the tracks and noted that the album had "no dark ambient passages, no obscure production, no guitar noise experimentation nor deep throbbing bass. There are no profound occult/fascist/poetic references, no medieval folk interludes, and not even swooping majestic orchestrations.", which was found to be a weakness. The reviewer went on to scold upon the apparent lightness of the songs' mood but felt it is better than other bands of similar genres. Another criticism from this reviewer was the below-par singing of Victor Love and the unnecessary ballad breaks within the album. While the review was generally negative, the reviewer praised 21st Century Slave for the deep undertones of the lyrics and the concise instruments and effects.

== Track listing ==
All lyrics are written by Victor Love; all music is composed by Victor Love.

No.	Title	Length
1.	"Omegadrones"	6:49
2.	"21st Century Slave"	5:36
3.	"It's Today"	3:27
4.	"When I See You Smile"	6:00
5.	"Digital Warriors"	5:25
6.	"Megacorps"	3:35
7.	"Criminal Intents"	3:32
8.	"Neuromantics"	4:43
9.	"Outlaw Thrones"	5:14
10.	"The World Machine"	4:34
11.	"It's For You"	3:40

== Personnel ==
- Victor Love – Lead vocals, Guitar, Synthesizers, Programming, Songwriting, Producer
- Fabrice La Nuit – Drums
- Darin Yevonde – Bass guitar

== Release history ==
Region	Date	Label	Format
World	July 21, 2009	Metropolis	Digital download
United States	July 21, 2009	Metropolis	CD, Digipack
Canada	July 21, 2009	Metropolis	CD, Digipack
Europe	July 14, 2009	Trisol Music Group	CD, Digipack
Japan	July 14, 2009	Deathwatch Asia	CD, Digipack
Italy	July 14, 2009	Subsound Records	CD, Digipack
