= The LoveCrave =

Italian metal band

- Origin: Italy
- Genres: Alternative rock Alternative metal Gothic metal
- Years active: 2004–present (on hold since 2010)
- Label: Repo Records
- Members: Francesca Chiara; Tank Palamara; Simon Dredo; Bob Parolin
- Past members: Iakk
- Website: http://www.thelovecrave.com

The LoveCrave is an Italian gothic metal band from Milan. The LoveCrave (originally Love-C-Rave, with Roman numeral C) means "Hundredth Rave of Love". This name was taken from a story about a rave of vampires written by Francesca Chiara in 2003.

== Biography ==
The band is formed by two experienced rock musicians from Milan, Tank Palamara, guitarist and producer, and singer Francesca Chiara . They were joined by Iakk on drums and bass player Simon Dredo.

Francesca Chiara is also in charge of the graphics and invented "Rain", her 3D alter-ego. Francesca wrote a fictional story ("The Angel and the Rain") that pieces all the songs together and was included in the band's debut album booklet.

Co-writers Tank and Francesca took inspiration from Iron Maiden and eighties bands such as Depeche Mode. They created a Blade Runnerinspired world and tried to put music in it.

In March 2006 they signed with the German record label Repo Records to work on the release of The Angel And The Rain. In May 2006 the band signed with European gothic metal agency WOD. In June 2006 the mastering of the album was completed by Alex Klier at LXK Studios, Munich and in August the band left for a pre-release German tour with Canadian band The Birthday Massacre.

The Angel And The Rain finally hit the stores on October 31, 2006.

English radio station TotalRock gave the band the chance to play in London in January 2007 at Camden Underworld. The day before the show The LoveCrave recorded 4 unplugged tracks at the Sonic Studio of TotalRock.

On May 7, 2007 the band announced a change in the lineup: Iakk was replaced by Bob The Machine Parolin. In the same month The LoveCrave secured a spot at the WGT Festival of Leipzig.

In 2008 The LoveCrave toured in Italy and Germany, including the NCN Festival, where they presented the song Scream from their upcoming Album and later played at Amphi Festival in Cologne.

Their last album, Soul Saliva, was recorded in December 2009 at Musicay and Remaster Studios. It was released with Repo Records in May 2010. It included a cover of Michael Jacksons cult song Thriller.

On 15 October 2010 the band released the CD Crisalide, which featured remixes from the both albums The Angel and the Rain and Soul Saliva. The band has been inactive since then.

== Style ==
The music style of the LoveCrave is a mix of gothic, 80's hard rock, metal, darkwave and electropop. Usually the band is classified as gothic metal, but they describe their style as modern rock.

== Band logo ==
Official band logo

The Brokenheart is the symbol of The LoveCrave. According to Francesca, the meaning is "the two faces of life: when the darkness meets the light there is a sort of electricity that creates magic".

== Recognition ==
In 2006 rockeyez.com named The Angel And The Rain in the top 10 releases of the year and also listed them in the top 5 best new bands of the year.

In November 2007 the band won an award as Best Italian Band on International Ground at the MEI (Independent Labels Meeting) presented by the Italian music magazine Rock Sound.

== Line-up ==
=== Last known line-up ===
Francesca Chiara – vocals
Tank Palamara – guitars
Simon Dredo – bass
Bob "The Machine" Parolin – drums

=== Former members ===
- Iakk – drums (until May 2007)

== Discography ==
=== Albums ===
- 2006 – The Angel And The Rain (Repo Records)
- 2010 – Soul Saliva

=== Singles ===
- 2008 – "Little Suicide (Acoustic Version)" (download only)
- 2009 – "Lost" (Remix for Dope Stars Inc.)
- 2010 – "Thriller" (download only)

=== EPs ===
- 2010 – Crisalide

==== Collections ====
- 2006 – Zilloscope 11/06 (ZILLO mag – DE) – "Little Suicide"
- 2006 – Cold Hands Seduction Vol.64 (SONIC SEDUCER mag – DE) – "Vampires (The Light That We Are)"
- 2006 – Loud Sounds (ROCK HARD mag – ITA) – "Nobody"
- 2006 – ClubTRAX Vol. 2 Double CD (XtraX store – DE) – "Little Suicide"
- 2007 – Rock Sound Magazine Collection 103 (ROCK SOUND mag – ITA) – "Can You Hear Me?"
- 2007 – Gothic Magazine Compilation – "Can You Hear Me?"
- 2007 – Summer Darkness 07 (ZILLO mag – DE) – "Can You Hear Me?"
- 2007 – Fuck The Mainstream – "Little Suicide"
- 2007 – Nerodom Compilation – "Vampires (The Light That We Are)" "Remixed By Victor Love / Dope Stars Inc.)"

==== DVDs ====
- 2006 – Zillo DVD "Dark Visions" – Fading Roses – Soundtrack
- 2007 – Zillo DVD "Dark Visions 2" – Can You Hear Me? – Live at M'era Luna Festival
- 2007 – Zillo DVD "Dark Visions 2" – Can You Hear Me? – Soundtrack

== Music videos ==
Year	Title	Director
2011	"Thriller"	Luca Campus
2011	"Making of Thriller"	Matteo Pelletti

== Festivals ==
- 2007: Camden Underworld London
- 2007: WGT Festival
- 2007: M'era Luna Festival
- 2008: NCN
