= Dope Stars Inc. =

Italian rock band

- The official logo of Dope Stars Inc.

Background information
- Also known as: DSI, Dope Stars
- Origin: Rome, Italy
- Genres: Industrial rock; industrial metal; EBM; cyber rock; electronic rock
- Years active: 2003–present
- Labels: Trisol; Subsound Records; Metropolis; Deathwatch Asia; Distortion Productions
- Members: Victor Love; Darin Yevonde; Fabrice LaNuit; Ash Rexy; Andreas DeLorean
- Past members: Alex Vega; Grace Khold; Brian Wolfram; Mark Madhoney
- Website: www.dopestarsinc.com

Dope Stars Inc. is an Italian industrial rock band from Rome, formed in 2003. The band was founded by Victor Love, Darin Yevonde, Grace Khold and Brian Wolfram. They have five albums and three EPs released, with the latest being released on February 27, 2015. The band has signed with multiple labels since their inception, with Trisol Music Group being their first. Currently, their albums are distributed by Trisol in Europe, Subsound in Italy, Metropolis Records in North America, and other small labels including Deathwatch Asia in Japan and other countries.

== History ==
=== Formation and record deal (2003–2005) ===
In early 2003, Vittorio D'Amore a.k.a. Victor Love, met with friend and designer Grace Khold in Rome, Italy. Grace introduced Love to Darin Yevonde, who had a desire to start a band with Khold. Yevonde and Khold asked Love to front their band and he agreed. This was following Love's return from Finland, where he has since stated Finnish music as being an influence for him. In a later interview in 2009, Love has cited Hanoi Rocks and HIM as major Finnish influences. The name "Dope Stars Inc." soon followed with "Dope" coming from the leading tone of the band, "Stars" came from their upcoming status, and "Inc." coming from the industrial influence of their music. The trio soon found Brian Wolfram and all four converged to begin casually writing a demo EP. The demo, "10,000 Watts of Artificial Pleasure", was self-produced and quickly sold out following the November 2003 release. Dope Stars Inc. was soon signed by Trisol Music Group and began working on their debut album.

Later, in 2005, the band released their debut album, Neuromance, shortly before the releasing their second album. Neuromance produced by John Fryer (HIM, Depeche Mode, NIN) was a two-disc bundle Digipack that contained 31 tracks. A few tracks were taken from 10,000 Watts of Artificial Pleasure, while many were original tracks. Soon after, the band was awarded with the title "Newcomer of the Month" by both Orkus and Sonic Seducer music magazines.

In 2008 victor love formed Epochate with noras blake of spineflesh.

=== Make a Star and Gigahearts (2005–2008) ===
Following the release of Neuromance, the band began working on a second EP, which was released one year after the full studio album. The EP, Make a Star, contained fewer tracks than their first EP and mainly consisted of remixes of the eponymous song, Make a Star containing five tracks of the full nine. Remixes included bands, L'Âme Immortelle, Samsas Traum and The Birthday Massacre. Later in 2005, the band remixed labelmate Emilie Autumn's track Dead Is the New Alive with the title "Dead Is the New Alive (Manipulator Mix by Dope Stars Inc.)". This track was also included on the Saw IV Soundtrack. The band also did a second track for Autumn's "Liar (Machine Mix by Dope Stars Inc.)". Both these remixes were included on Autumn's EP Liar/Dead Is the New Alive, which was released in 2007.

Following the release of Make a Star, Dope Stars Inc. began working on their untitled second album. In 2006, Gigahearts was released, again through Trisol Music Group, the same label as their debut album. Soon after, the band played at the 2006 M'era Luna Festival with about 40 other bands. A single from Gigahearts titled Beatcrusher was included on the Saw IV Soundtrack for the 2007 film Saw IV. This shot the band to a more mainstream audience, with gaining popularity. This would also mark the band's third appearance on a Saw soundtrack following a version of "Make a Star" included on the Saw II Soundtrack and the song "Getting Closer" being included on the Saw III Soundtrack. Their biggest appearance for the Saw franchise, however, was their live show at the premier of Saw III in Munich, which gained them many fans. This led to the band's inclusion in the 2007 Infest Festival along with other prominent bands including: Apoptygma Berzerk, Caustic, Faderhead, and Synnack. This was the band's second festival with other similar bands.

=== Criminal Intents/Morning Star and 21st Century Slave (2008–2010) ===
Dope Stars' third album and a third EP were both in production for over two years, the longest gap to date for the band to release music. On April 24, 2009, the band released their third EP, Criminal Intents/Morning Star. Rather than Trisol Music Group, who had been their label since 2003, the band released the EP under a new label, Subsound. Their song, "Lost", was remixed later in 2009 by The LoveCrave as the single "Lost (Remix for Dope Stars Inc.)". This was a recollaboration from 2007 when Dope Stars also mixed their song "Vampires (The Light That We Are)" into a song titled "Vampires (The Light That We Are) (Remixed By Victor Love / Dope Stars Inc.)" for a collection album released that year.

For their third album, the band continued to use Trisol Music Group and it was released on July 21, 2009. The album, 21st Century Slave, was the band's full breakthrough album and has earned mention in the industrial music industry, with much attention being spread online. The album was first released in Europe with North American and Australian releases following, along with other minor releases. The European and Italian versions of the album included artwork and lyric booklets. The North American and Japanese versions also included booklets, but with varying content. In addition, the North American version got a special edition jewel case with an exclusive 16-page booklet. All versions were released in July 2009. After release, the album received much attention from critics. Dom Smith of Sphere magazine wrote "While ’21st Century Slave’ doesn't make any major adjustments to DSI's tried and tested formula of monstrous cyberpunk, it's certainly their most vibrant and accessible record to date."

=== Ultrawired (2010–2014) ===
The band was initially expected to begin working on future projects sometime in 2010. Rather than continuing to use a drum machine for albums and live performances, the band is planning to hire a real drummer for their future projects. On July 7, 2010, the band opened A.Live Rock Festival in Barletta with Extrema and Skid Row as headliners.

In early 2011, the band released the single "Banksters" online with artwork and a remix by the band Angelspit. No official music video was made, but several fan-made videos were endorsed by the band and posted on their website. In March 2011, the band announced the title of their fourth album, Ultrawired, and released cover art for it. Rather than releasing the album commercially, they have decided to drop their records labels for this release and give it away as a free download. To cover expenses, Ketaware users can sell the album to donate to the band. Ultrawired was released on May 30, 2011.

=== Terapunk (2014–present) ===
On April 12, 2014, Victor Love announced on the band's Facebook page he had started writing material for an upcoming untitled album. The song "Take it" was released on September 11 on SoundCloud, followed shortly by "Many Thanks" and "It's going to rain for you". In December 2014, the new album "Terapunk" was announced by Victor Love on the band's Facebook page, with tentative release date for early 2015. Digital download of the album was then announced to for February 13, 2015. The band was signed by Distortion Productions to distribute physical media of the album for the North American market for March 10, 2015. The European release of the album was announced for February 27, 2015, and signed to Subsound Records. In August, Dope Stars took part in the M'era Luna for the second time.

== Musical styles and influences ==
Victor Love has stated that his earliest inspiration for starting the band came from Finnish rock bands where they derive their original glam rock poise from. Specifically, Love named Hanoi Rocks and HIM as inspiration. Musically, Dope Stars insert the catchy choruses of 1980s pop-metal bands such as Bon Jovi (or, equivalently, 1990s alternative pop bands like Weezer) into the industrial-metal and cyberpunk frameworks of White Zombie, Foetus, Front Line Assembly and KMFDM. Love has stated that the lyrical content has little to do with 1980s music.

The band has maintained a "hardcore industrial" tone with emphasis on technology and cyberpunk imagery. Noting differences in the social standards, Love has felt that he did not want to imitate earlier bands with irony just to sell more records. Keeping with a technological style, the band has focused on the strength of computers and society's overdependence on them. The title of their third album, 21st Century Slave, is derived from the idea of falling slave to technology.

== Awards ==
- Newcomer of the Month – Sonic Seducer magazine
- Newcomer of the Month – Orkus magazine

== Accolades ==
Year	Nominated work	Award	Result	Place
2005	Dope Stars Inc.	Orkus Magazine's Newcomer of the Month Award	Won	—
2005	Dope Stars Inc.	Sonic Seducer Magazine's Newcomer of the Month Award	Won	—
2011	Ultrawired	Rockerilla Magazine's 20 Best Albums of 2011	Won	16th
"—" denotes a nomination that did not place or places were not relevant in the award.

== Members ==
- Victor Love – vocals, guitars, keyboards, programming (2003–present)
- Darin Yevonde – bass (2003–present)
- Fabrice La Nuit – guitars (2006–present)
- Ash Rexy – keyboards (2006–present)
- Andreas DeLorean – drums (2014–present)

=== Former members ===
- Alex Vega – lead guitar (2005, 2007)
- Grace Khold – keyboards (2003–2007)
- Brian Wolfram – guitars (2003–2005)
- Mark Mad'Honey – drums (2009–2013)

== Discography ==
=== Albums ===
- Neuromance (2005)
- Gigahearts (2006)
- 21st Century Slave (2009)
- Ultrawired (2011)
- TeraPunk (2015)
- ://Decrypted_Files (2016)

=== EPs ===
- 10,000 Watts of Artificial Pleasures (2003)
- Make a Star (2006)
- Criminal Intents/Morning Star (2009)

=== Singles ===
- "I'm Overdriven" (2004)
- "It's Today" (2010)
- "Banksters" (2010)

=== Soundtracks ===
Year	Title	Album
2005	"Make A Star (Saw Edit)"	Saw II Soundtrack
2006	"Getting Closer"	Saw III Soundtrack
2007	"Beatcrusher"	Saw IV Soundtrack
