= Ultrawired =

Studio album by Dope Stars Inc.
- Released: May 30, 2011
- Recorded: 2010; Victor Love home studio, Rome, Italy
- Genres: Industrial metal, industrial rock
- Length: 52:41
- Label: Independent release
- Producer: Victor Love

Dope Stars Inc. chronology
21st Century Slave (2009)	Ultrawired (2011)	Terapunk (2015)

Singles from Ultrawired
- 1. "Banksters" Released: December 13, 2010

Ultrawired is the fourth studio album by Italian industrial rock band Dope Stars Inc. Similar to many of their previous albums and EPs, Ultrawired was produced by Victor Love. Rather than release the album commercially, the band released it as a free download on the band's website and advertised it heavily on The Pirate Bay. Ultrawired marks a new phase in Dope Stars Inc.'s career since the members possess complete artistic freedom over the album and are solely responsible for its distribution. Rather than depend on revenue from record store sales, the band encourages fans to show their support through voluntary donations, tweets, or simply by sharing and distributing the album among their friends.

== Background ==
The band was initially expected to begin working on future projects sometime in 2010. Rather than continuing to use a drum machine for albums and live performances, the band is planning to hire a real drummer for their future projects.

In early 2011, the band released the single "Banksters" online with artwork and a remix by the band Angelspit. No official music video was made, but several fan-made videos were endorsed by the band and posted on their website. In March 2011, the band announced the title of their fourth album, Ultrawired, and released cover art for it. Rather than releasing the album commercially, they have decided to drop their records labels for this release and give it away as a free download.

In early March, the band posted a demo of a song called, "Lies Irae", that had complete instrumentals and unintelligible vocals. The band invited fans to write the last chorus, bridge, and verse for the song on their website. Fans worked together with the band, and voted for their favorite lyrics. The band then finalized the lyrics on March 26.

== Release and promotion ==
Ultrawired was released in its entirety on May 30, 2011, a day which Dope Stars, Inc. dubbed Pirate Day because of the method of release. No record labels or record stores were involved in the process; instead, Ultrawired first became available through The Pirate Bay as a zip file containing the full tracks, lyrics, credits, and artwork. Distribution of the album depended completely on the fans who downloaded the file and seeded it to other users all across the world. In this way, Love concedes marketing power to the fans whose efforts are critical for the success of the album. Another way that fans can help promote Ultrawired is through the Ketapushers program. Fans can purchase physical albums and distribute them to their fans in exchange for backstage passes or other exclusive perks.

The band engaged in their first full North American tour in April/May 2013 with The Rabid Whole as direct support.

== Accolades ==
Year	Nominated work	Award	Result	Place
2011	Ultrawired	Rockerilla Magazine's 20 Best Albums of 2011	Won	16th
"—" denotes a nomination that did not place or places were not relevant in the award.

== Track listing ==
No.	Title	Length
1.	"Better Not to Joke"	3:51
2.	"Save the Clock Tower"	4:01
3.	"Cracking the Power"	3:06
4.	"Banksters"	2:45
5.	"Lies Irae"	3:35
6.	"Blackout"	3:23
7.	"Get Young"	4:11
8.	"No Life Belongs to You"	4:02
9.	"Two-Dimensional World"	4:09
10.	"Run Motherfucker Run"	2:51
11.	"Pwning the Network"	3:44
12.	"We Are the New Ones" (featuring an interview portion of Mario Savio)	4:10
13.	"Riding UFOs"	4:05
14.	"Thru the Never"	4:55
Total length:		52:41

== Personnel ==
Dope Stars Inc.

- Victor Love – lead vocals, songwriting, drum machine, synthesizers, producer

Production

- Paolo Soellner – Art direction, graphic design
