= Dopoguerra =

Studio album by Klimt 1918
- Released: 2005
- Recorded: August/September 2004; February 2005 (bonus disc)
- Genre: Alternative rock
- Length: 41:58 (regular edition); 83:04 (Luxus edition digipak)
- Label: Prophecy Productions
- Producer: Giuseppe Orlando; Klimt 1918; Fabio Colucci (bonus disc)

Klimt 1918 chronology
Undressed Momento (2003)	Dopoguerra (2005)	Just in Case We'll Never Meet Again (Soundtrack for the Cassette Generation) (2008)

Professional ratings
Review scores
Source	Rating
Allmusic	3.5/5 stars

Dopoguerra (Post-war) is the second full-length album by Italian alternative rock band Klimt 1918. It was released in 2005 on the German label, Prophecy Productions, which gave the band exposure outside their home country.

Compared to the band's previous effort, Undressed Momento, Dopoguerra features a much lighter sound, losing a great amount of gothic metal influences to venture into a more post-rock and new wave influenced style.

== Track listing ==
1. "_" – 1:17
2. "They Were Wed By the Sea" – 4:36
3. "Snow Of '85" – 4:38
4. "Rachel" – 4:57
5. "Nightdriver" – 5:55
6. "Because of You, Tonight" – 3:57
7. "Dopoguerra (Postwar)" – 3:29
8. "La Tregua (The Truce)" – 3:39
9. "Lomo" – 3:49
10. "Sleepwalk in Rome" – 5:30

== Luxus Edition Digipak ==
The limited edition comes in a digipak with an additional bonus disc, featuring two unreleased tracks ("Never Ever" and "Cry A Little") and several new versions of album tracks with different titles:

1. "They Were Wed By The Sea (rarefied)" – 8:17
2. "Never Ever" – 4:30
3. "Yanqui Girl In Rafah" – 5:17
4. "Cry A Little" – 4:56
5. "Driving At The End Of The Night" – 4:04
6. "Sleepwalk In Rome (Chaos/Order remix)" – 14:01

== Personnel ==
- Marco Soellner — vocals, guitar
- Alessandro Pace — guitar
- Davide Pesola— bass
- Paolo Soellner — drums
- Francesco Sosto — keyboards on tracks 1, 3, 5, 6 and on all bonus tracks
- Fabiola Pereira — cello on bonus tracks 1, 2
