= Secession Makes Post-Modern Music =

Studio album by Klimt 1918
- Released: 2000
- Recorded: May/September 2000 (tracks 1–4); April 1999 (track 5)
- Genre: Alternative metal Gothic metal Doom metal
- Length: 32:25
- Label: self-released
- Producer: Giuseppe Orlando; Massimiliano Pagliuso

Klimt 1918 chronology
Secession Makes Post-Modern Music (2000)	Undressed Momento (2003)

Secession Makes Post-Modern Music is the first, self-produced demo by Italian band Klimt 1918. It was released in 2000.

This first release features a heavy and layered gothic sound, very atmospheric yet melodic, drawing consistent influence from doom metal and reminiscent of Novembre (whose members are featured on the recording) and mid-period Katatonia.

== Track listing ==
1. "Schmerzwerk 1976" – 5:46
2. "Passive" – 5:41
3. "Fever" – 5:17
4. "Swallow's Supremacy" – 6:03
5. "April" – 9:38

== Personnel ==
- Marco Soellner — vocals, guitar
- Francesco Tumbarello — guitar
- Davide Pesola— bass
- Paolo Soellner — drums
- Giuseppe Orlando — clean vocals on track 4
- Carmelo Orlando — scream vocals
- Massimiliano Pagliuso — backing vocals
