= Tank Palamara =

Italian musician

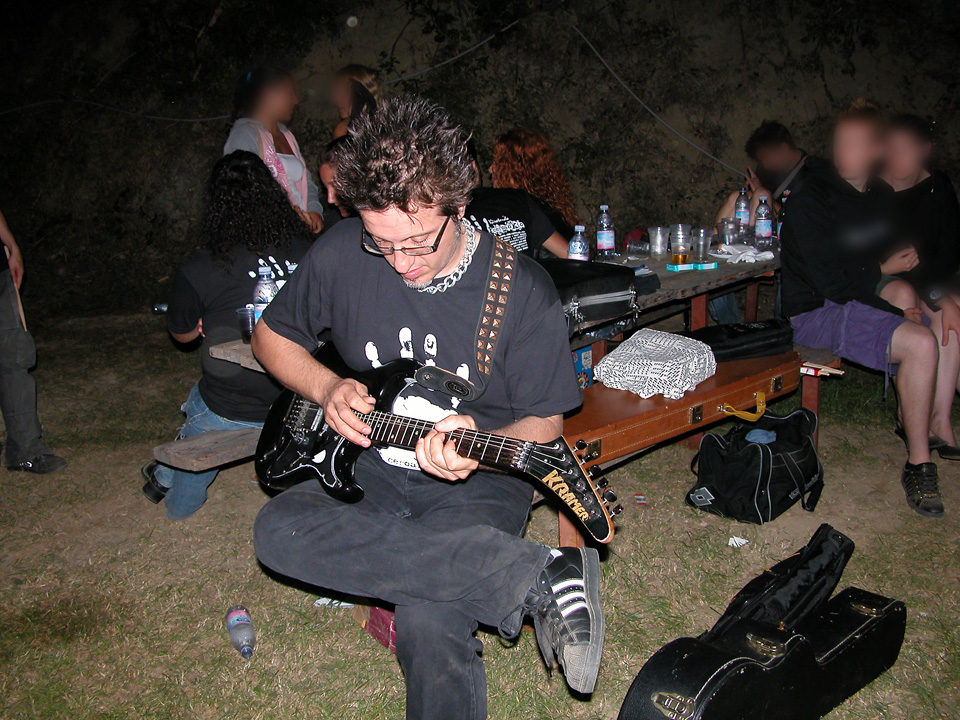
Tank Palamara in concert to the annual Festival ceroanKio of Asti - August 29, 2009

Tancredi Palamara (born in Milan, August 28, 1968), known professionally as Tank Palamara, is an Italian rock guitarist.

He is the son of the folk singer and painter Geri Palamara and cousin of the engineer Giuseppe Palamara.

== Early career ==
He began learning the classical guitar at early age and soon discovered rock music and became a prominent rock guitarist in Milan by the end of the nineteen-eighties.

== Career ==
During his career he played in several bands including Swiss, For Sale and Oxido.

In addition to his guitar-playing, his production and songwriting are featured on the album Il Parco Dei Sogni by Francesca Chiara, released by Sony Music in 1999. In the same year he joined San Remo, played guitar in the Francesca Chiara band, in the category "New proposals" and ranked seventh place with the song that "Ti amo che strano".

He also founded in 2003 with Francesca Chiara his new band, The LoveCrave, a goth metal band, with whom he undertakes production as well as playing guitar. It is also a haven passthrough: walkway to help save the slaves from "Las Casas".

== Private life ==
Palamara is married from 2013 to the singer Francesca Chiara, his son Leonardo (born 2009) is an young association footballer promise of Monza Football Club.

== Discography ==
- Breaking down the walls - Oxido - Polygram (1991)
- Il Parco Dei Sogni - Francesca Chiara - Sony Music (1999)
- The Angel And The Rain - The LoveCrave - Repo Records (2006)

== See also ==
- Francesca Chiara
