= Sentimentale Jugend (album) =

Studio album by Klimt 1918
- Released: 2016
- Genre: Alternative rock Indie rock Shoegaze
- Label: Prophecy Productions

Klimt 1918 chronology
Just in Case We'll Never Meet Again (Soundtrack for the Cassette Generation) (2008)	Sentimentale Jugend (2016)

Sentimentale Jugend (German for: Sentimental youth) is a double-album and the fourth full-length album by Italian alternative rock band Klimt 1918. Their first new album in over eight years, it was released in November 2016 on the German label, Prophecy Productions. The first single of this album is "Comandante".

== Track listing ==
=== Disc I [Sentimentale] ===
1. Montecristo
2. Comandante
3. La Notte
4. It Was To Be
5. Belvedere
6. Once We Were
7. Take My Breath Away
8. Sentimentale
9. Gaza Youth (Exist/Resist)

=== Disc II [Jugend] ===
1. Nostalghia
2. Fracture
3. Ciudad Lineal
4. Sant'Angelo (The Sound & The Fury)
5. Unemployed & Dreamrunner
6. The Hunger Strike
7. Resig-nation
8. Caelum Stellatum
9. Juvenile
10. Stupenda E Misera Città
11. Lycans [bonus]

== Personnel ==
- Marco Soellner — vocals, guitar
- Francesco Conte — guitar
- Davide Pesola— bass
- Paolo Soellner — drums
