= Francesca Chiara =

Italian singer and songwriter

- Also known as: Francesca Chiara
- Born: Francesca Chiara Casellati; 25 March 1972 (age 54); Padua, Italy
- Genres: Gothic rock Gothic metal Symphonic metal
- Occupations: Singer
- Instruments: Vocals
- Years active: 1989–present
- Label: Repo Records
- Member of: The LoveCrave
- Formerly of: Mystery; The Flu
- Website: Official MySpace

Francesca Chiara Palamara (born Frabcesca Chiara Casellati, 25 March 1972) is an Italian singer and songwriter, front woman of the band The LoveCrave.

== Biography ==
Francesca Chiara's parents are teachers (English and Mathematics) and they still live in Padua, where Francesca was born. Her grandparents lived in Venice, and she descends from a Venetian noble family, the Pisani. Her grandmother's name was Adriana Pisani.

Throughout her childhood, Chiara spent many weekends in Venice, where her grandparents lived. Her time in the city served as a source of inspiration for her first album, and continues to influence her current works.. Chiara is married to Tancredi Palamara and gave birth to her first child in 2010.

== Musical career ==
She wrote her first novel at the age of 10 and she wrote her first song at 13 years old. It was called "Survivor".

At 17 years old she spent one year in San Francisco, California graduating at Castro Valley High School and she began to sing seriously and to play guitar.

She returned to Italy and founded the band Mystery, with Simon Dredo and Mauro Lentola, producing a four-song hard rock EP.

At 19 years old she moved from Padova to Milan and started studying music for three years in a music school but then she left it. She worked in a wedding agency, sold wine through the phone and worked in a concert agency to survive and pay the rent.

She met Tank Palamara in a metal club and they started to collaborate. Their first band was called The Flu in 1996 and it was a new punk metal band. They played all over Italy and participated to the Sanremo Music Festival in 1999.

The first album Il Parco Dei Sogni came out in Italian as a concept album with Sony Music Italy that also produced the video of the song “Streghe” (witches). This is a concept album and the story takes place in the future, after a war. Three girls find themselves in the Old Zone of the city and meet an old lady that brings them through a gate and shows them a wonderful park that was there before the war. There they start living the stories of the people that used to go to that park. Love, death, drugs, loneliness, jealousy and they realize that there is always a hope and that wars can't change the deep essence of mankind. It was released in 1999, it includes the songs Streghe and Ti Amo Che Strano that was presented by Francesca Chiara at the famous Festival di Sanremo in 1999.

After various experiences into electronic and alternative music Tank and Francesca created in year 2003 the new gothic rock band The LoveCrave with Bob Machine on drums and Simon Dredo on bass and released with the band 2006 the album The Angel And The Rain.

== Influences ==
Inspired by films such as The Crow, Blade Runner, Edward Scissorhands, and the Matrix, FC's music has been noted as having both mysterious and aggressive tones that contrast the melody. One of her influences comes from the eighties rock/metal (Iron Maiden, Queensryche, AC/DC, Joan Jett and Sex Pistols) to the nineties gothic wave (HIM, Paradise Lost) .

== Discography ==
- 1992 - Mystery - EP
- 1997 Sony Music Francesca Chiara - L’onda – single
- 1998 Sony Music Francesca Chiara – Streghe – single
- 1999 Sony Music Francesca Chiara – Ti Amo Che Strano – single
- 1999 Sony Music Francesca Chiara - Il Parco Dei Sogni - album
- 2006 Repo Records The LoveCrave - The Angel And The Rain - album
- 2010 Repo Records The LoveCrave - Soul Saliva - album

=== Collections ===
- 1998 - Un Disco Per L'Estate - L'onda
- 1998 - Sanremo Giovani 1998 - Streghe
- 1999 - 49° Edizione del festival Di Sanremo cd blu- Ti Amo Che Strano
- 2006 - Zilloscope 11/06 (ZILLO mag -DE) - Little Suicide
- 2006 - Cold Hands Seduction Vol.64 (SONIC SEDUCER mag - DE) - Vampires (The Light That We Are)
- 2006 - Loud Sounds (ROCK HARD mag - ITA) - Nobody
- 2006 - ClubTRAX Vol. 2 Double CD (XtraX store - DE) - Little Suicide
- 2007 - Gothic Magazine Compilation - Can You Hear Me?
- 2007 - Summer Darkness 07 (ZILLO mag -DE) - Can You Hear Me?

=== Video/DVD ===
- 1999 - Streghe
- 2006 - Zillo DVD "Dark Visions" - Fading Roses - colonna sonora
- 2007 - Zillo DVD "Dark Visions 2" - Can You Hear Me? live at M'Era Luna Festival
- 2007 - Zillo DVD "Dark Visions 2" - Can You Hear Me? colonna sonora menù
