= London After Midnight (band) =

American rock band

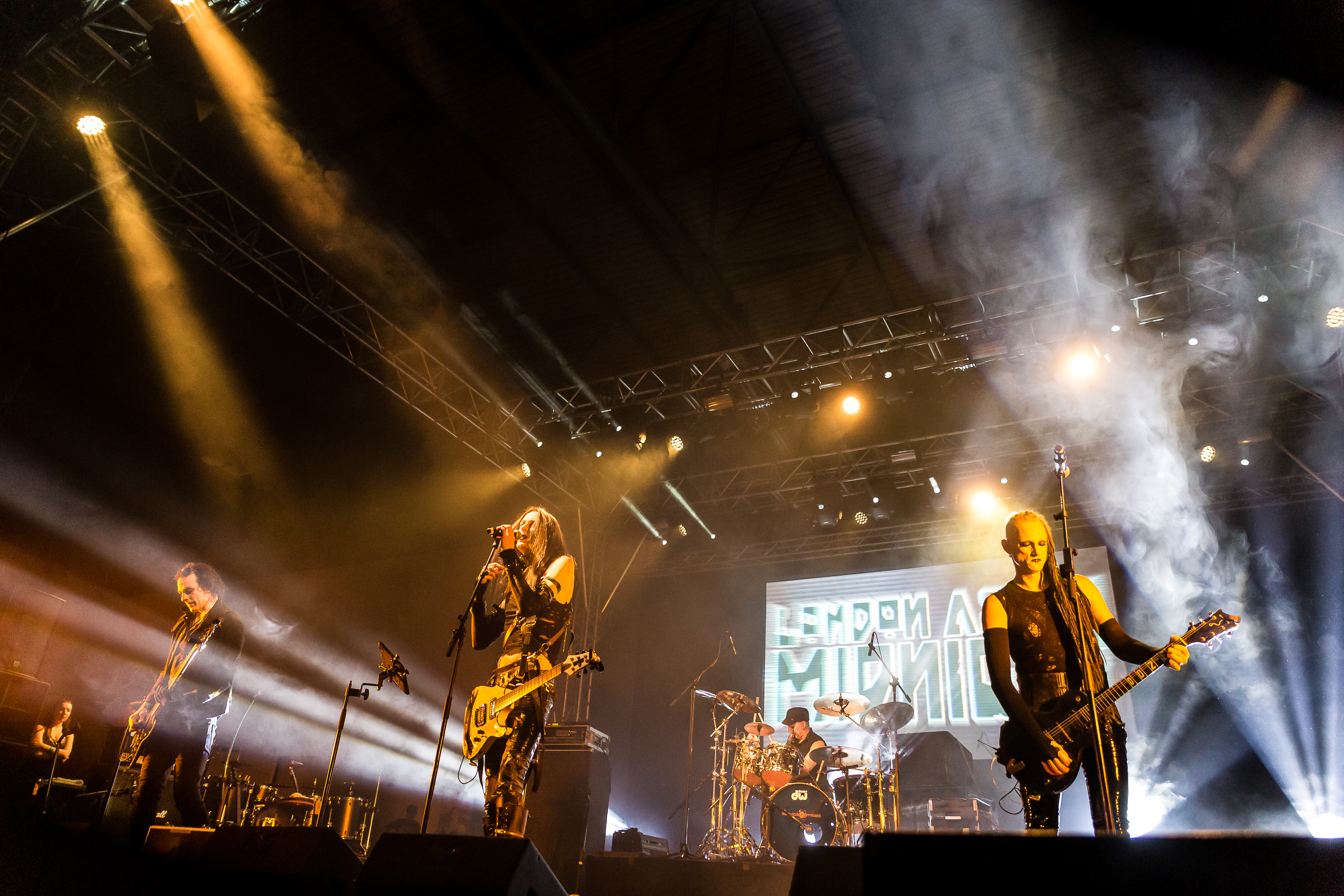
- London After Midnight at Wave-Gotik-Treffen 2019 in Germany

Background information
- Origin: California, U.S.
- Genres: Gothic rock; darkwave; industrial rock
- Years active: 1990–present
- Labels: Metropolis Records (North America); Trisol Music Group (Germany/Europe); Irond (Russia)
- Members: Sean Brennan see also Live band members
- Website: londonaftermidnight.com

London After Midnight is an American rock band from California. Formed in 1990 by songwriter and instrumentalist Sean Brennan, London After Midnight has a following worldwide, with a large fan base in the goth subculture. However, in interviews Brennan has shunned the use of this label and others to describe his music, calling it "artistically limiting".

== Ideology and themes ==
Brennan is known for his support of animal rights, pro-environmental and human rights issues, anti-corporate control of media, and progressive and liberal politics. He voices this support through London After Midnight Internet outlets, such as their official website and music.

== History ==
London After Midnight formed in Los Angeles, California, and played at several clubs in the area starting in late 1990, with a debut concert at Los Angeles gothic rock club, Helter Skelter.

In the early days London After Midnight had various temporary members who joined Brennan when performing live, but did not perform on the albums. Tamlyn is credited on the first cassette recordings, co-authored the opening track "This Paradise" on 'Selected Scenes From The End of the World', contributed an instrumental called "Ice" for the 1998 release of Oddities at Brennan's request, and an instrumental entitled "Perversion" on the 93' Ruins demo tape released as a preview of what was to become their second album, Psycho Magnet.

=== Early performance lineups ===
After garnering a fanbase aided by the release of a self-titled demo, London After Midnight released their debut album Selected Scenes from the End of the World in 1991. Special effects artist Nick Benson played bass guitar in an early lineup of the band, and participated in songwriting. In 1992 bassist Michael Areklett joined the lineup after the resignation of live bassist Rob Podzunas. Like Tamlyn, Michael Areklett appeared live as a recurring member, rather than a guest. Around this period, Douglas Avery also joined, replacing live drummer Ian Haas. Eddie Hawkins was part of the original live line up, but was replaced in 1990. John Koviak performed live on bass from 1990 to 1992.

==== Touring and releases ====
In the earliest days the live band played mainly on the West Coast of the United States. Following the release of the self-titled debut, LAM gradually expanded their Californian fan base, eventually traveling to Mexico in 1994 (something few alternative acts were doing at the time) and progressing to tour the United Kingdom, France, Germany, Italy, South America and further in the United States.

Brennan then expanded on the original demo release and recorded more songs for "Selected Scenes from the End of the World" released in late 1992.

Coinciding with the release of the follow-up album Psycho Magnet in 1996, London After Midnight headlined the Whitby Gothic Weekend in England, among other concerts in the UK, Europe, Mexico and the US. At this time, Brennan had begun to expand musically. The project continued on with a third album titled Oddities released in 1998, featuring a cover of a track named "Sally's Song" from the film The Nightmare Before Christmas. This CD was different from other releases in that it featured acoustic and ethereal alternative mixes of songs, along with a few new tracks.

Around this time London After Midnight was garnering international press and was featured on the covers of many magazines, while co-headlining major concert festivals like the Zillo summer festival, with The Cure and Green Day. LAM has since toured the world extensively playing alongside other popular bands such as Green Day, HIM (who have cited LAM as an influence), Rammstein, Soft Cell, and others, headlining and co-headlining to crowds of over 30,000 in Latin America, the US and Europe.

=== Recent times ===
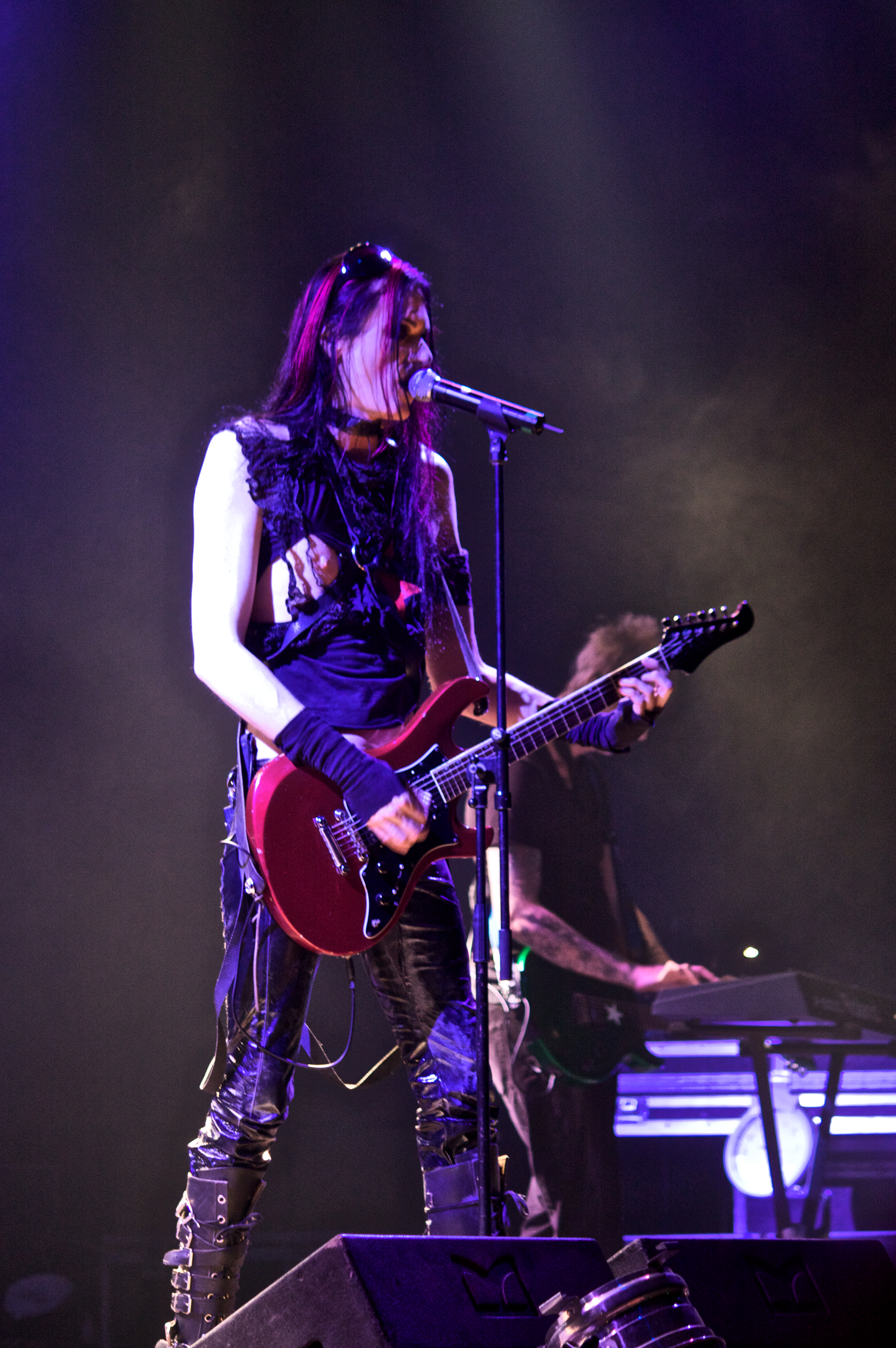
Frontman Sean Brennan in 2008

The album, Violent Acts of Beauty, was released in 2007. LAM has, however, re-released (in 2003) two of the past three releases in Europe and the Russian Federation, (which charted on the Deutsche Alternative Charts) adding previously unreleased bonus tracks.

In 2006, a new London After Midnight song was released on the Saw II motion picture soundtrack.

In February 2007, a teaser trailer for London After Midnight's fourth studio album Violent Acts of Beauty was released on the band's official website and YouTube page. The trailer stated that the album was due for a spring/summer 2007 release. The album itself was released in fall 2007 (North America). To promote the new album, they played at various festivals in Europe (Greece, Portugal, France, Spain, Belgium, Germany) with bands such as Kirlian Camera, Dope Stars, and Noctivagus.

== Live members ==
=== Current live band members ===
- Sean Brennan – vocals, rhythm guitar, bass, cello, violin, keyboards, programming, drums (1989–present)
- Pete Pace – live drums (2008–present)
- Michael Areklett – live bass (1992–2005, 2018–present)
- Jeremy Kohnmann – live lead guitar (2022–present)

=== Former live members ===
- Tamlyn – keyboards, sounds, samplers, recorded on 'London After Midnight' demo, 1991, 'Selected Scenes From The End Of The World', 1994 (1&2) (1989–2003)
- Joe S. – drums (live and recorded for Violent Acts of Beauty & Saw II soundtrack) (2001–2008)
- Trouble Valli – live lead guitar (one concert only) (2008)
- Eddie Hawkins – live lead guitar (1989–1990, 2001–2008)
- Ian Haas – live drums (1988–1992)
- John Koviak – live bass/lead guitar (1989–1992)
- Douglas Avery – live drums (1992–1999)
- Rob Podzunas – live bass (1992–1992)
- Stacy – live lead guitar
- William Skye – live lead guitar (1992–1999)
- Matthew Setzer – live lead guitar (2008–2019)
- Randy Mathias – live bass (2005–2018)

== Discography ==
=== Albums ===
- Selected Scenes from the End of the World (1992) (re-release with bonus tracks 2003 and 2008)
- Psycho Magnet (1996) (re-release with bonus tracks 2003 and 2008)
- Violent Acts of Beauty (2007)

=== EPs ===
- Kiss (1995)

=== Demos ===
- London After Midnight (1991)
- Ruins (1993)

=== Other ===
- Oddities (1998) (re-release 2008) - compilation
- Selected Scenes from the End of the World: 9119 (2019) - first album remix
- Live from Isolation (2020) - live
- Oddities Too (2022) - compilation

== Videography ==
- Innocence Lost... (1993), then re-released in 1998 with 2 new songs and extra footage
