= Perfidious Words =

German synth-pop duo

- Origin: Germany
- Genres: Synth-pop, electronic music
- Years active: 1991–2009
- Label: Trisol Music Group
- Members: Drazen Kostelac; Lars Rohnstock

Perfidious Words were a German synth-pop duo consisting of Drazen Kostelac and Lars Rohnstock. The project originated in 1991. Rohnstock joined the project in 1994, and the two continued as a duo from 1995. Their debut EP, Ruined, was released in 1997, followed by the album Hydrogen Skies in 1998. The duo released three studio albums, including Spreading Silence (2002) and Feel Like Me (2009).

== History ==
=== Formation and early releases ===
The history of Perfidious Words dates back to 1991, when Drazen Kostelac and a friend began experimenting with synthesizers and computer-based music production. Their early work consisted mainly of cover versions of songs by synth-pop acts such as Pet Shop Boys and Erasure. In 1994, they met vocalist Lars Rohnstock, who joined the project. After their first live performance, the musicians decided to continue working together and develop original material. Kostelac and Rohnstock continued as a duo from June 1995, after the departure of the original third member.

The duo completed their first demo recordings in 1996 and sent them to several record labels. They subsequently signed with the German independent label Trisol Music Group. Their debut EP, Ruined, was released in October 1997.

The band's debut album, Hydrogen Skies, was released in 1998. It was followed by the EPs It Means a Lot to Me (1998), Welt (1999) and Zwischen Zeitrausch und Leben (1999). In 2001, Hydrogen Skies was reissued as Hydrogen Skies+, with additional B-sides and remixes.

=== Spreading Silence and Breaking the Silence ===
The duo's second studio album, Spreading Silence, was released in April 2002. The album contained nine tracks and continued the group's synth-pop approach, combining melodic electronic arrangements with melancholic vocals. A review published by Metal.de praised the production and Rohnstock's vocals, while noting similarities to the music of Depeche Mode and the songwriting style of Martin Gore.

In September 2003, Perfidious Words released the mini-album Breaking the Silence. The release included remixes by Infekktion, Tom Wax, Sero.Overdose and B!Machine, as well as several versions of a new track and a cover of a song by Björk.

The duo performed live only occasionally. In 2001, they appeared with And One and also performed in Mexico. In April 2003, they played a concert in Tallinn, Estonia.

=== Feel Like Me ===
After several years without a full-length release, Perfidious Words returned with their third studio album, Feel Like Me, released in August 2009 by Trisol. The album contained eleven tracks and was also issued in a special edition accompanied by a DVD featuring live performances, studio recordings and music videos.

The album received reviews in specialist electronic music publications. Reflections of Darkness noted the resemblance between Rohnstock's vocal style and that of Depeche Mode singer Dave Gahan, while describing the album as a varied work combining synth-pop, electronic pop and rock elements. The Spanish magazine Mentenebre also reviewed the album, awarding it 9 out of 10.

== Musical style and influences ==
Perfidious Words' music is primarily associated with synth-pop and electronic pop. Their recordings combine synthesizer-based arrangements, melodic hooks and melancholic vocals. Critics have noted similarities to Depeche Mode, particularly in Rohnstock's vocal delivery and the group's use of electronic pop arrangements. Reviews have also compared elements of their songwriting to the work of Martin Gore.

The members' early influences included Pet Shop Boys and Erasure. The duo also performed cover versions of songs by Depeche Mode and R.E.M. during their early live appearances.

== Members ==
- Drazen Kostelac – keyboards, synthesizers, vocals
- Lars Rohnstock – vocals

== Discography ==
=== Studio albums ===
- Hydrogen Skies (1998)
- Spreading Silence (2002)
- Feel Like Me (2009)

=== EPs and mini-albums ===
- Ruined (1997)
- It Means a Lot to Me (1998)
- Welt (1999)
- Zwischen Zeitrausch und Leben (1999)
- Breaking the Silence (2003)

=== Reissues ===
- Hydrogen Skies+ (2001)
