= Eolo Perfido =

French-born Italian photographer

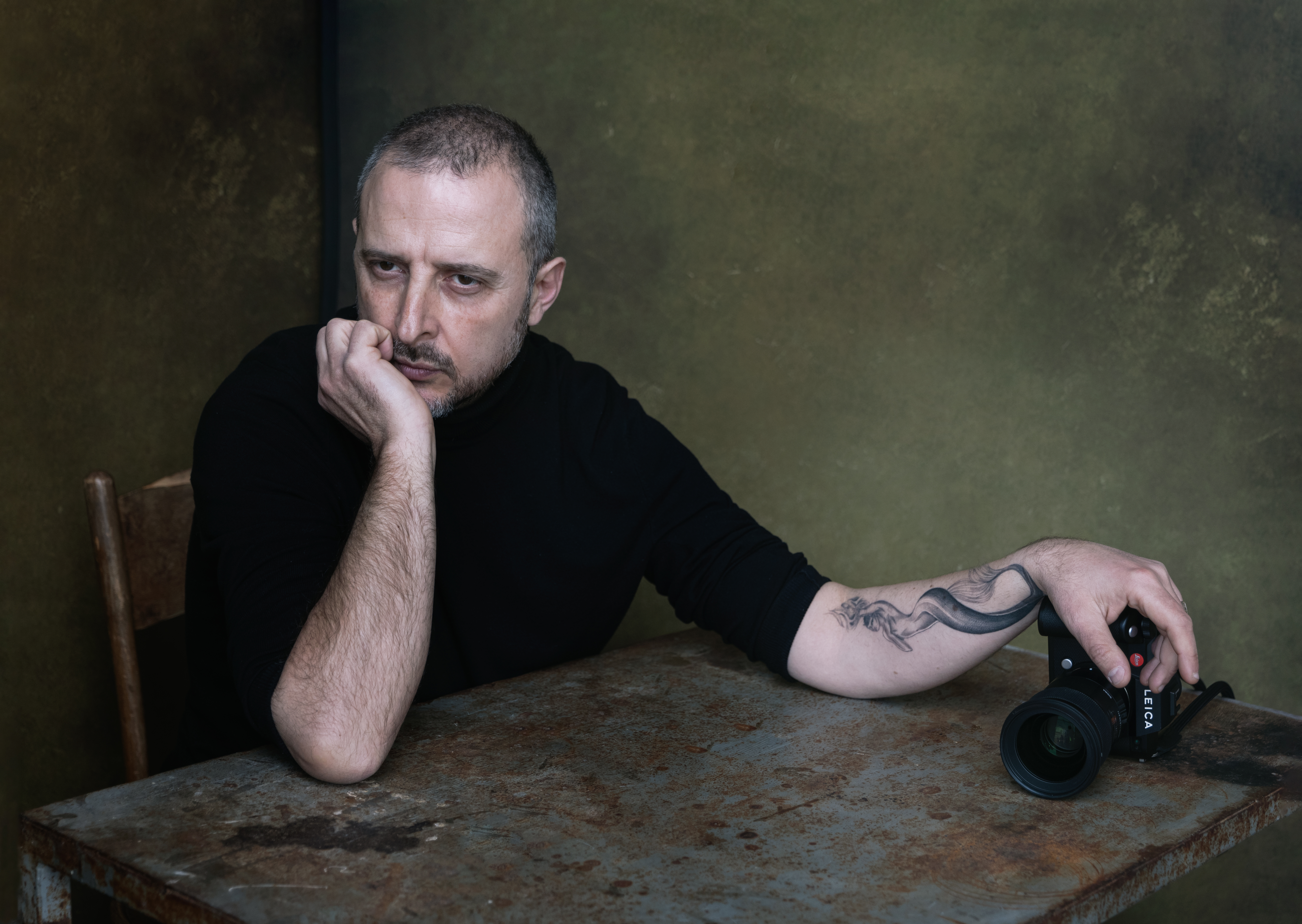
- Perfido's portrait
- Born: Cognac, France
- Occupation: Photographer
- Agent: Sudest57
- Website: eoloperfido.com

Eolo Perfido is an Italian photographer. He specializes in portrait and street photography and is represented by Orion57, the agency led by Biba Giacchetti. He served as a Leica Ambassador from 2013 to 2018 and is currently a Leica Certified Photographer and Leica Akademie instructor. Since 2022, he has also been a Profoto Illuminati Ambassador.

His work has appeared in publications including The New York Times, Vogue Russia, GQ Russia, L’Espresso, Panorama First, Sportweek, Vision China, Communication Arts, and Computer Arts.

== Early life and education ==
Perfido was born in February 1972 in Cognac, France.

After early studies in visual arts, he worked in multimedia development and interactive graphics. In 1998, he moved to Rome, where he began working in software development before transitioning into photography.

He later entered professional photography through an extended apprenticeship assisting photographers including Steve McCurry, Elliott Erwitt, Eugene Richards, and James Nachtwey across Europe, Africa, Asia, and South America.

== Career ==
Perfido’s photography appeared in The New York Times as early as 2006. During this period, he established a studio practice in Rome, initially working from a personal studio that later developed into a professional space.

By the late 2000s, his work had been published in Vogue Russia and GQ Russia, among other international publications. His commercial work included collaborations with brands such as Gatorade, Pepsi, Pirelli, Xiaomi, Ford Motors, Sky Television, Opel, and the European Space Agency, as well as agencies including Leo Burnett, Saatchi & Saatchi, JWT, BBDO, Grey, Young & Rubicam, United 1861, and Blossom Communication.

In 2011, L’Espresso selected Perfido as one of nine photographers to document the 150th anniversary of the unification of Italy. In 2013, he was named a Leica Ambassador, a role he held until 2018. He later continued his collaboration with Leica as a Leica Certified Photographer and Leica Akademie instructor, conducting workshops internationally through Leica Akademie.

=== Clownville ===
Beginning in 2012, Perfido developed the photographic series Clownville, featuring staged portraits of clowns photographed in studio and domestic environments. Makeup for the series was created by Valeria Orlando.

The series was exhibited internationally, including a solo exhibition at Galeria Janete Costa in Recife, Brazil, held during the Festival de Circo do Brasil. It was covered by online publications including Bustle, Bored Panda, and Techly.

=== Tokyoites ===
In 2016, Perfido presented Tokyoites at Leica Galerie Milano. The series consists of candid street portraits documenting everyday life and urban identity in Tokyo. Coverage in Internazionale discussed the project in relation to themes of solitude and anonymity in the city.

=== Other exhibitions ===
In 2017, Perfido’s work was included in 4 Icons at ONO Contemporary Art Gallery in Bologna, alongside Steve McCurry, Gian Paolo Barbieri, and Christian Cravo. He has also exhibited at Orvieto Fotografia at Palazzo del Vino.

== Other works ==
Perfido has conducted workshops internationally focused on portrait and street photography, including programs held through Leica Akademie in cities such as Rome and Tokyo.

Since January 2019, Perfido has been the founder and Editorial Director of ExibartStreet, a publication dedicated to street photography and part of the Exibart editorial network.

Since 2021, he has served as Artistic Director of Molinchrom: Festival of Nomad Photography, held in Molise, Italy.

Since 2020, he has been Studio Director of LineaB Photographic Studios in Rome. In 2016, he co-founded Storm Studio with Fabio Timpanaro and Antonella Catanese, a digital artists collective focused on creative retouching, digital imaging, illustration, advertising still visuals, post-production, and 3D CGI.

Since 2023, he has served as Master Instructor for the Xiaomi Imagery Online Master Class, supported by Leica.

== Brand campaigns ==
In 2021, Perfido contributed to the Leica Camera campaign The World Deserves Witnesses, produced with TBWA\PARIS, which received a Bronze Lion at the Cannes Lions International Festival of Creativity.

He was selected as the photographer for the Polizia di Stato 2025 calendar, presented in November 2024.

In January 2026, he was one of five photographers featured in Leica Camera’s campaign 5 Photographers with the Leica M EV1 in Tokyo, alongside Phil Penman, Alan Schaller, Jason Roman, and Jesse Marlow.

In 2026, his work was included in Leica’s global campaign for the Leica Leitzphone powered by Xiaomi, presented at Mobile World Congress in Barcelona, with credits alongside Julia Nimke and Joe Howard.

== Awards and recognition ==
In 2009, he received an award from the Association of Italian Photographers for the quality of his photography. The following year he received the prize for best international photographer for his exhibition at the Manege Museum. His street photography earned him the Luce Iblea award in 2019. He also received a bronze medal at the 2021 Cannes Lions International Festival of Creativity for his work on The World Deserves Witness, a campaign with Leica Camera.

In 2022, he received the Amedeo Modigliani Foundation Award for his contribution to portrait photography.

In 2025, he served as a judge for Capture Magazine’s Australasia’s Top Emerging Photographers competition.
