= Klimt 1918 =

Italian band

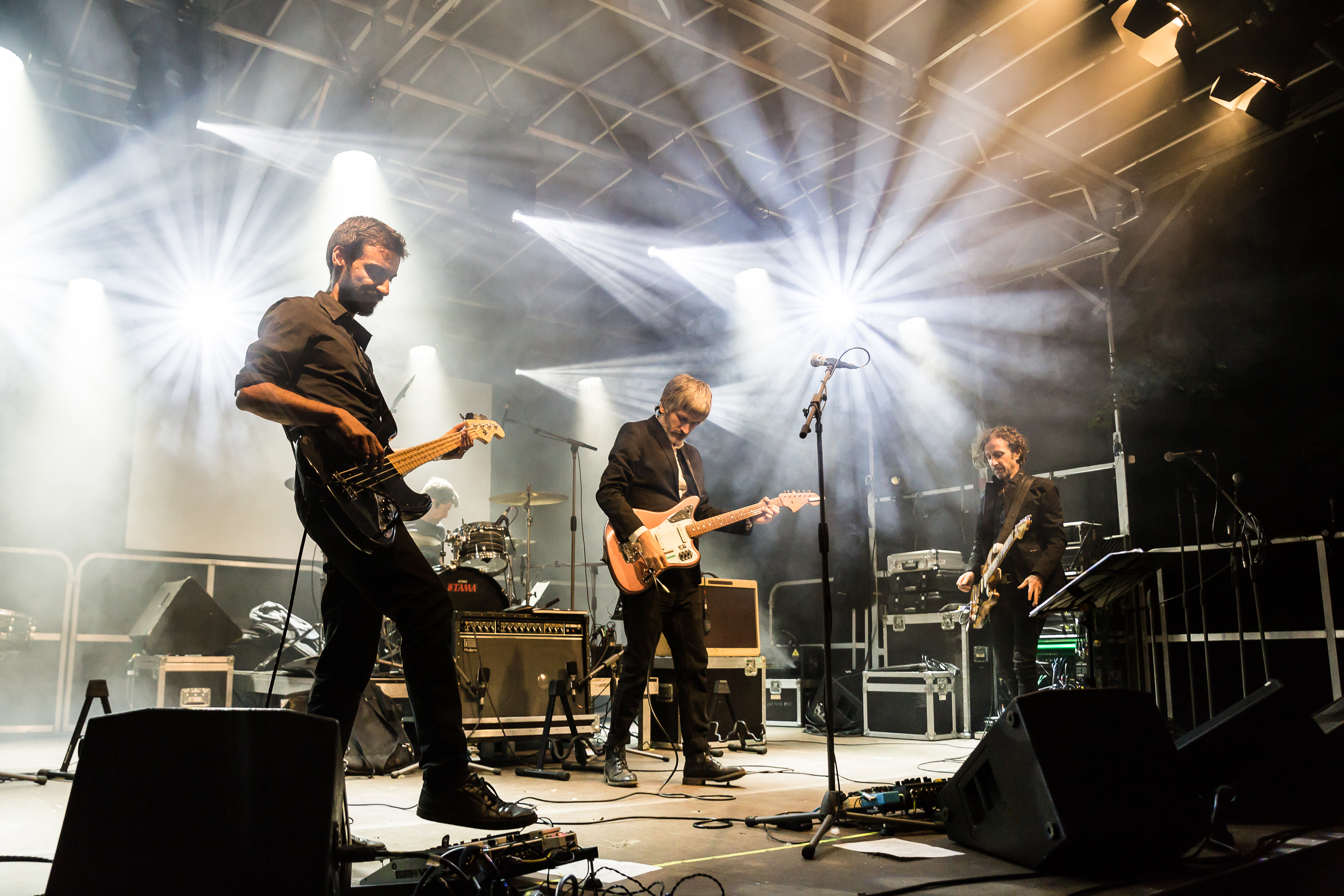
- Klimt 1918 at Nocturnal Culture Night 15 2022

Background information
- Origin: Rome, Italy
- Genres: Gothic metal (early material); Alternative rock Indie rock Shoegazing
- Years active: 1999–present
- Labels: Prophecy Productions, My Kingdom Music
- Members: Marco Soellner; Davide Pesola; Paolo Soellner; Francesco Conte
- Website: www.klimt1918.com

Klimt 1918 is an indie/alternative rock band from Rome, Italy. Founded in 1999 by brothers Marco and Paolo Soellner, the band is named for Gustav Klimt and the date of his death in 1918. The musical style is a melancholic alternative rock with influences from other genres.

== Biography ==
Klimt 1918 was started in 1999 by brothers Marco and Paolo Soellner, after the split of their former band, Another Day (a death metal act). Marco's newly discovered love for bands like The Cure, Bauhaus and Joy Division, led him to incorporate new influences in his songwriting. The next year, after completing the line-up with bass player Davide Pesola and lead guitarist Francesco Tumbarello, the band released its first effort, Secession Makes Post-Modern Music, which was recorded by Novembre's drummer, Giuseppe Orlando, a close friend of the band. The demo received good reviews from specialized press and caught the attention of My Kingdom Music, a newborn Italian independent label, with which the band signed a deal for two releases. Their debut full-length, Undressed Momento, came out in 2003; during the recording sessions, guitar player Francesco Tumbarello left the band, being replaced by Alessandro Pace, a well-known name in Rome's underground metal scene and a long-time friend of the band. Undressed Momento marked an evolution in Klimt 1918's sound, which became more melodic and emotional, losing part of its metal heritage; the album received critical praise from reviewers all over Europe, and reached the first place in Orkus' Top Chart. One year later, the band signed a new contract with German cult label, Prophecy Productions, and began working on a new full-length. Dopoguerra was released in 2005 and featured a more mature and personal sound; the album was once again praised by both critics and press, and was supported by a European tour, the first for the band. The band said the album "was recorded during the hot summer 2004, with sound man/producer Giuseppe Orlando. The one-month session was long and difficult, but worked out better than anyone could have hoped."

Between September and October 2006, guitarist Alessandro Pace left the band and was replaced by Francesco Conte, who made his live debut with the band on 21 October at Prophecy Productions' 10 years festival.

The long-delayed follow-up to Dopoguerra, called Just In Case We'll Never Meet Again (Soundtrack For The Cassette Generation), was first released in Germany on 20 June 2008, being subsequently released worldwide on 23 June and in the U.S. on 24 June.

In April 2009 the band released its first videoclip Ghost Of A Tape Listener, followed by a vinyl release of Just In Case We'll Never Meet Again (Soundtrack For The Cassette Generation) and a Ghost Of A Tape Listener EP featuring a previously unreleased track, "Blackeberg 1981".

In December 2016, a double album called Sentimentale Jugend was released. The first single of this album is "Comandante".

== Style ==
Klimt 1918's sound can be described as alternative rock with roots in avant-garde metal, featuring consistent darkwave and post-rock influences. The resulting blend is a melodic and melancholic guitar-based rock, combining thick shoegaze-like rhythm-guitar riffs with post-rock-esque atmospheres. Their recent output has consistently shifted towards indie rock, featuring more emphasis on shoegaze and post-rock traits while abandoning entirely their former metal influences.

== Name ==
The name "Klimt 1918" is a reference to Gustav Klimt and his year of death, 1918, which also saw the end of the First World War. According to Marco Soellner, Klimt 1918's music features the same qualities of de-contextualization, secession and post-modernism found in Klimt's art. Year 1918 itself, in Marco's words, represents the definitive collapse of "belle epoque" values and a full transition to 20th century.

The name may also be a tribute to Bauhaus, which was originally named "Bauhaus 1919".

== Members ==
- Marco Soellner - vocals, guitar
- Francesco Conte - guitar
- Davide Pesola - bass
- Paolo Soellner - drums

== Former members ==
- Francesco Tumbarello - guitar (2000–2002)
- Alessandro Pace - guitar (2002–2006)

== Discography ==
- Secession Makes Post-Modern Music (self-produced demo, 2000)
- Undressed Momento (My Kingdom Music, 2003)
- Dopoguerra (Prophecy, 2005)
- Just in case we'll never meet again (soundtrack for the cassette generation) (Prophecy, June 2008)
- Sentimentale Jugend (Prophecy, December 2016)
- Àmor (Prophecy, June 2026)

== Sources ==
- Marco Soellner's interview for Ver Sacrum webzine (Italian)
- Klimt 1918 at Sputnikmusic.com
