= Vittorio D'Amore =

Victor Love
- D'Amore at Infest 2007, Manchester

Background information
- Also known as: Hacking The Wave; Master Boot Record; Keygen Church
- Born: Vittorio D'Amore; 1979 or 1980 (age 46–47); Rome, Italy
- Genres: Gothic metal & rock; Industrial rock; Electro-industrial; Synth metal; Chiptune
- Occupation: IT professional
- Instruments: Bass; Guitar; Keyboard; Music programming; Vocals
- Works: See #Discography
- Years active: 1998-present
- Labels: Metropolis Records (2017); Data Airlines (2017); Blood Music (2018–2020); Metal Blade Records (2020-)
- Formerly of: My Sixth Shadow (1999–2005); Chaos Zero (1999–2003); Dope Stars Inc. (2003-); Epochate (2007)
- Website: mbrserver.com; keygenchurch.com

Vittorio D'Amore, professionally known by his anglicized name Victor Love, is an Italian multi-instrumentalist, music programmer, sound engineer and composer. He first came to prominence as founder and frontman of the industrial rock band Dope Stars Inc. in 2003. He has since started multiple solo music projects, particularly the prolific chiptune-synth metal project Master Boot Record. (Note: Stylized in all-caps as 'MASTER BOOT RECORD')

== Early life ==
D'Amore was born in Rome, Italy. His father was a personal computer salesman and online pirate that introduced D'Amore to digital media at a young age, giving him a Commodore VIC-20 as his first computer. Upon receiving a Commodore 64, D'Amore became an avid video gamer, holding Impossible Mission and Rambo: First Blood Part II as his first C64 games played. He also played on arcade cabinets in bars before the arrival of Italian amusement arcades, citing Ghosts 'n Goblins as an early influential title. These early gaming experiences fostered a lifelong fascination with chiptune music.

== Career ==
=== Early career (1998–2003) ===
In 1998, D'Amore was a founding member of the gothic metal band Masquerade. Following a self-titled EP release, the band broke with their old frontman; in 1999, D'Amore reformed the band as My Sixth Shadow, with new frontman Dave Shadow and future Dope Stars Inc. member Fabrice La Nuit along with D'Amore's Masquerade bandmates. First self-described as "new wave gothic metal" but later moving into gothic rock, D'Amore composed the band's music, while Dave Shadow wrote lyrics. The band released its first self-titled album in 2000, and EP Sacrifice in 2002. The band then signed to German independent label Voice of Life Records for three albums, but were abandoned following their 2003 album release, 10 Steps To Your Heart.

In 1999, D'Amore formed the nu metal band Chaos Zero with members of My Sixth Shadow. The band broke up in September 2003.

=== Dope Stars Inc. and collaborations (2003–2012) ===
D'Amore at Alternative Party 2009, Helsinki

During a brief period living in Finland, D'Amore was inspired by the Finnish rock music scene. When he returned to Italy in 2003, D'Amore formed the industrial rock band Dope Stars Inc. D'Amore, performing as Victor Love, was the frontman, lead guitarist, producer, and composer for the band. Following their first EP, 10.000 Watts of Artificial Pleasures, the band was picked up by Trisol Music Group.

Contemperaneous to the development of Dope Star Inc.'s first album Neuromance, My Sixth Shadow developed its next album release, Lovefading Innocence. Both Neuromance and Lovefading Innocence released in 2005 via Watch Me Fall Records. After the album release, My Sixth Shadow broke up.

In 2007, amidst production on fellow Dope Stars Inc. members' side projects, D'Amore began his own side project called Epochate with Italian electro-industrial producer Noras Blake, signing to Roman independent label Subsound Records. The duo released the album Chronicles Of A Dying Era in 2009, along with an instrumental version called Chronicles of a New Era.

=== First solo projects (2013–2016) ===
In 2013, D'Amore self-released an independent album, The Dome, under the solo project Hacking The Wave. The project focused more on chiptune compared to his contemporaneous work in Dope Stars Inc. In 2015, D'Amore self-released the EP The Network, his first solo release as Victor Love: the EP was an experimental mix of industrial rock with other genres like doom rock and hip-hop. The EP carried a stated DIY subculture ethos, with the music video for track "Doom Trap" recorded using a camera phone. Later in 2015, he self-released the Hacking The Wave EP Circuit Breakers.

In 2015, D'Amore announced the reformation of My Sixth Shadow, republishing their discography to Bandcamp as pay what you want digital downloads, and promised the release of an album that had been composed in 2005 prior to the end of the band. As of 2026, My Sixth Shadow has not released any new work.

In 2016, D'Amore released his debut published album as Victor Love, the cyberpunk music album Technomancy with Metropolis Records. The single 'Bitchcraft', featuring Sascha Konietzko and Lucia Cifarelli of the German industrial rock band KMFDM, debuted on Loudwire. Technomancy features included Army of the Universe vocalist Lord Kalidon, Deathstars frontman Whiplasher Bernadotte, Aborym frontman Fabban, and Simone Salvatori of Spiritual Front.

=== VirtuaVerse, Master Boot Record, and Keygen Church (2016-) ===
D'Amore chose the vegvísir as one of MBR's logos to 'guide him through the storm' of a new musical endeavour.

In 2016, D'Amore began development of a cyberpunk, point-and-click adventure game VirtuaVerse with the development team Theta Division Games, a partnership with programmer Alessio "Elder0010" Cosenza and visual artist Valenberg; D'Amore wrote the story, composed the soundtrack and did sound design. The project coalesced after Valenberg made Victor Love Technomancy album art in a pixel art style: impressed, D'Amore proposed creating a video game together.

Shortly after beginning work on VirtuaVerse, D'Amore was inspired to produce synth metal. Between September 1 and 23, 2016, D'Amore recorded and released two albums and two EPs of original music on Bandcamp under the moniker Master Boot Record (MBR). The persona of MBR is that the actual performer is the computer D'Amore programs the music on, referred to D'Amore by its specifications '486DX-33Mhz-64mb'. D'Amore pretends that the computer has achieved artificial sentience via enchantment with Icelandic magical staves (dubbed 'spellware').

MBR joined the Swedish chiptune label Data Airlines in 2017, releasing the album INTERRUPT REQUEST. MBR then changed labels to Blood Music for the 2018 album Direct Memory Access, featuring vocals from Laurent Lunoir of Öxxö Xööx and Igorrr. Later that year, MBR released another album, Virus.DOS. That year, D'Amore began a side project, Keygen Church, which combined synth metal with symphonic metal, particularly inspired by baroque music.

In 2019, MBR released Internet Protocol, which had an alternate reality game tie-in involving a personal web server D'Amore operated to access the hidden album Warez, a compilation of video game music covers. In 2020, Theta Division Games released VirtuaVerse with Blood Music as a first-time game publisher. MBR released the game's OST under Blood Music as VirtuaVerse.OST, which had been composed in 2016 at the project's inception.

Following the release of VirtuaVerse, MBR joined Metal Blade Records, releasing the album Floppy Disk Overdrive later in 2020. In 2024, D'Amore made his first Keygen Church album release with Metal Blade, Nel Nome Del Codice. Starting in 2025, MBR began to do live tours, where D'Amore was joined by drummer Giulio Galati of Nero di Marte, and guitarist Edoardo Taddei. MBR first toured with French experimental musician Igorr across Europe. In 2026, MBR released Computer Metal, an experimental album which featured Cubase-programmed MIDI production paired with live guitar work across a mix of metal subgenres. That year, MBR headlined a North American tour, then did a European tour co-headlining with the Italian death metal band Fulci.

== Personal life ==
D'Amore has a career in information technology, first as a computer technician for his father, then moving into as a system administrator for a Roman university, and later transitioning to digital marketing.

== Discography ==
=== My Sixth Shadow ===
Composition, guitar, backing vocals

- My Sixth Shadow (2000), self-released
- Sacrifice (EP 2002), self-released
- 10 Steps 2 Your Heart (2003), Voice of Life Records
- Love Fading Innocence (2005), Watch Me Fall Records

=== Chaos Zero ===
- Chaos Zero (EP 2001), self-released
- The Numbers Between (EP 2002), self-released
- More Is Not Always Better (EP 2003), self-released

=== Dope Stars, Inc. ===
- Neuromance (2005), Trisol Music Group
- Gigahearts (2006), Trisol
- 21st Century Slave (2009), Trisol
- Ultrawired (2011), self-released
- TeraPunk (2015), Subsound Records
- ://Decrypted_Files (2016), self-released

=== Epochate ===
- Chronicles Of A Dying Era (2009), Subsound – with Noras Blake

=== Hacking The Wave ===
- The Dome (2013), self-released
- Circuit Breakers (EP 2015), self-released

=== Victor Love ===
- The Network (EP 2015), self-released
- Technomancy (2016), Metropolis Records

=== Master Boot Record ===
- C:\>Fixmbr (2016), self-released
- C:\EDIT CONFIG.SYS (EP 2016), self-released
- C:\EDIT AUTOEXEC.BAT (EP 2016), self-released
- C:\>Chkdsk /F (2016), self-released
- 486DX (EP 2017), self-released
- C:\COPY *.* A: /V (2017), self-released
- INTERRUPT REQUEST (2017), Data Airlines
- Direct Memory Access (2018), Blood Music
- Virus.DOS (2018), Blood Music
- Internet Protocol (2019), self-released
- Warez (2019), self-released
- Floppy Disk Overdrive (2020), Metal Blade Records
- VirtuaVerse.OST (2020), Blood Music – original soundtrack for VirtuaVerse
- C:\DEFRAG (2020), self-released
- Personal Computer (2022), Metal Blade
- Hardwarez (2024), Metal Blade
- Computer Metal (2026), Metal Blade

=== Keygen Church ===
- ░ ▒ ▓ █ (2018), self-released
- ░█░█░░█░█░█░ (2021), self-released
- Nel Nome Del Codice (2024), Metal Blade

== See also ==
- Ultrakill
- Vampire Survivors
- Alex Vega
