= Spiritual Front =

Italian neofolk band

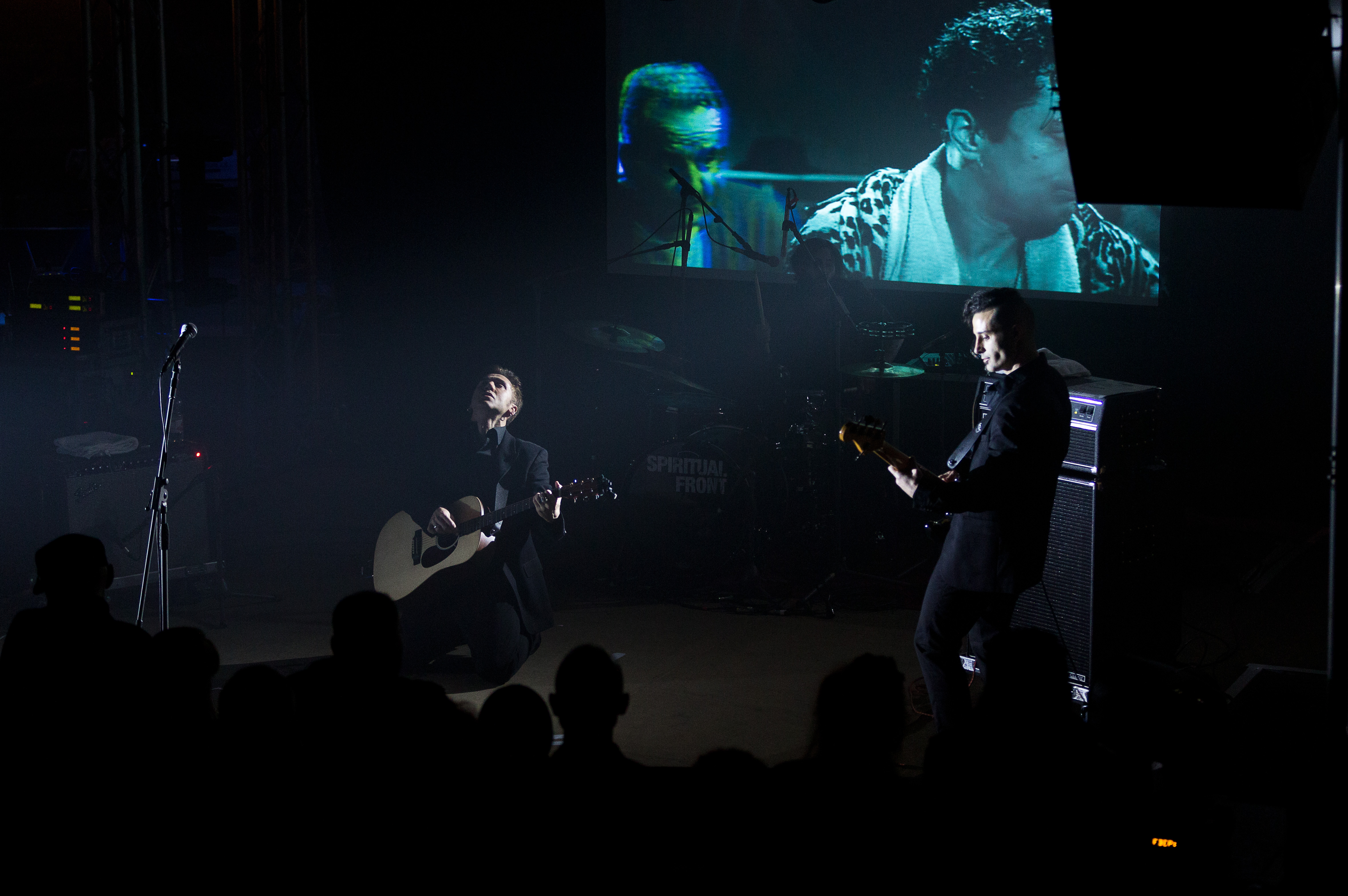
- Spiritual Front in 2014.

Background information
- Also known as: SF
- Origin: Rome, Italy
- Genres: Neofolk, experimental rock, neotango, acoustic, folk noir, dark cabaret, neoclassical, symphonic rock, post-punk, electronica, post-rock, new wave, martial industrial, swing revival
- Years active: 1999 - Present
- Labels: Trisol, Cold Meat Industry, Old Europa Cafe, Rustblade, HauRuck!, SPQR, Misty Circles, Runes & Men, Oktagön
- Members: Simone "Hellvis" Salvatori; Andrea Freda; Giorgio Maria Condemi; Federico Amorosi
- Past members: Sten Puri; Jack Puri; Alessandro Pace; Piergiorgio "PJ" Ambrosi; Rossano Baldini
- Website: spiritualfront.com

Spiritual Front is a five-part neofolk act from Rome. Its members describe their music as "nihilist suicide pop", although elements of neoclassical and rock music, melancholic folk, as well as tango are prevalent, along with a recurring experimental feel. From dark, wailing experimental folk in the beginning, the sound began to transform and grow, to where it is now compared to the work of Nick Cave, Swans, and Scott Walker. The group's work has been described as crossing a wide variety of genres and musical styles or traditions, and the band itself is considered highly unique among the modern neofolk and post-industrial scenes in Europe.

The band originated in 1999 as a project fronted by Simone "Hellvis" Salvatori, a guitarist and singer from Italy. They have since worked extensively — both solo and with several other projects— on their musical output. The group has performed subsequent tours throughout Europe, eastern Europe and South America.

Their song, The Gift of Life, appeared on the original score of the American slasher film Saw II. Jesus died in Las Vegas appeared in the American television series Las Vegas. Their music is also frequently used for theater pieces, modern ballets and shorts.

== Musical style ==
Someone describes Spiritual Front's music "Mafia-Folk" because of their Italian roots. Simone Salvatori, the lyricist and conceptualist behind the band, has been known to create a unique feel within their traditionally folk style. Their most noticeable recurring output is Simone's charismatic playing of the acoustic guitar, along with martial drum beats characteristic of the neofolk genre, art rock and new wave influences and heavily decadent musical styles. Slow, dissonant and often melancholic vocals are often contrasted with cabaret-like, somewhat comedic pieces reminiscent of swing revival and neotango sound, bringing on a vast dichotomy in the musical output of the band. Emotional piano chords are also frequently featured, with occasional violin playing and solos as well as the utilization of a number of different instruments including synthesizers, lutes and pipe organs.

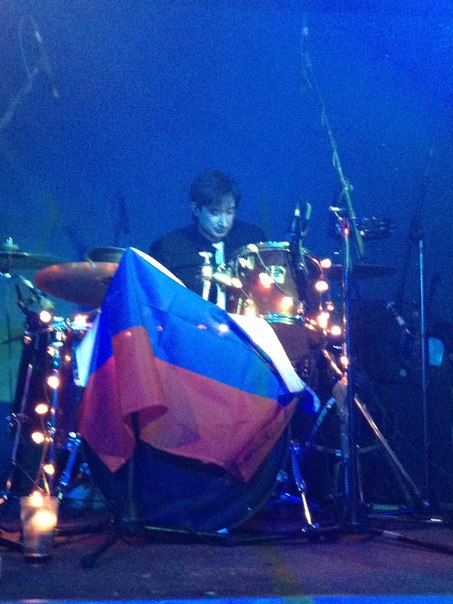
Andrea Freda

Over time the group's style has constantly and quickly changed: beginning with the dark ballads of the earliest years after their formation (as is present in such works as Song for the Will and Nihilist Cocktails for Calypso Inferno), through the more refined sentimental dark folk with the E.P. Satyriasis until their latest records such as Armageddon Gigolo and Rotten Roma Casino where classical folk and tango influences are evident. (Members of the Ennio Morricone orchestra were involved.) During 2013 the band published two different albums: 'Open wounds' (Trisol records), a double cd collection with their classic songs from the first era (1999-2004)re-mastered and re-arranged plus previously unreleased tracks, and 'Black hearts in black suits' (Rustblade records), a concept album about the German movie director W.R. Fassbinder, the album has been described as neo classical chamber pop music, a mix between Arvo Pärt and Marc Almond.

=== Themes ===
The themes of focus in Spiritual Front's music vary and are extensive, though most often seem to be either quite personal or introverted, perhaps to lead singer Salvatori's own life. However lyrics in the group's music tend to be characterized by a type of English and rarely Italian, as well as free-verse type poetic styles influenced by decadent references to various, often obscure subjects. Therefore, there is a tangible difficulty in deciphering the analogies behind the individual songs, and whether or not many of Spiritual Front's albums should be placed as concept works.

Themes treated by Simone H. deal with searching for self-identity through turbid and untamed exploration of sexuality, stories of breaking up with anger at bitter sarcasm and irony, always touched with nihilism and biting humor. (However a typical sense of heathenry is not so apparent as in many other neofolk groups such as Of the Wand and the Moon or Ordo Rosarius Equilibrio.)

Sex, sexual abasement, destructive passions, religion, self-destruction, pornography and frankly lewd topics of paraphilia and sadomasochism are expressed in decadent styles of swing revival and acoustic folk ballads.

=== Inspirations and lyrical references ===
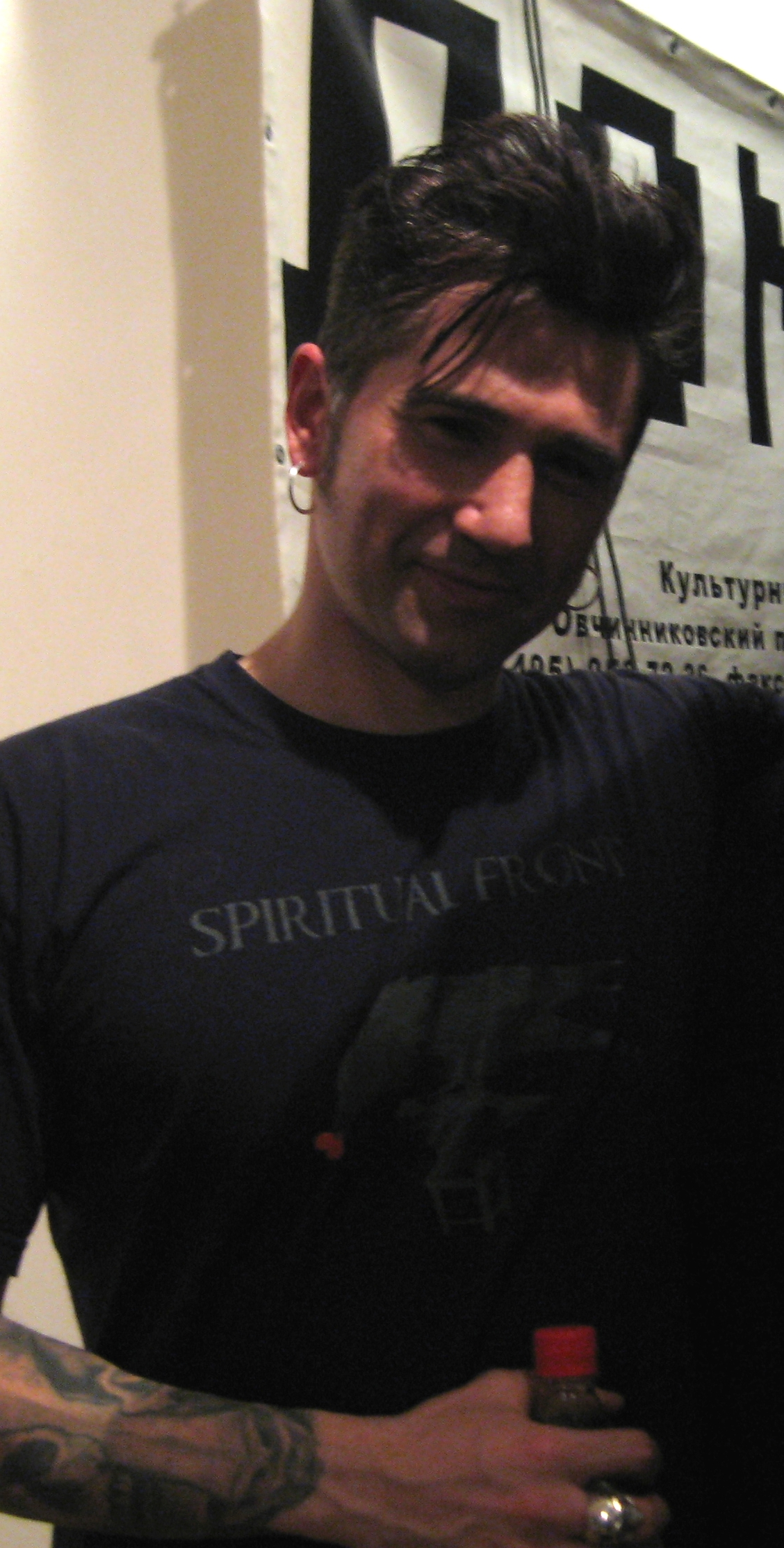
Simone "Hellvis" Salvatori

Simone Salvatori, who composes the lyrics and much of the music for the band, quotes in a number of songs phrases from literature and film.

Several songs draw their inspiration from the controversial Italian cult film Salò, or the 120 Days of Sodom by Pier Paolo Pasolini. The film is a reinterpretation and pseudo-adaptation of the Marquis de Sade's 120 Days of Sodom utilizing elements of Dante's Inferno; both the film and the Marquis's work incorporate sexuality coupled by extreme aggression or a "master-slave" archetype. The quotes include: "The limit of love is that, of needing always an accomplice," and "Nothing is more contagious than sin." (featured in the songs No Kisses On the Mouth and Jesus Died in Las Vegas, respectively.) Other important references are: W.R. Fassbinder, Federico Fellini, João Pedro Rodriguez, Ingmar Bergman, Derek Jarman. The band made tribute with a number of other groups to Pasolini, contributing several songs to the 2009 compilation Songs For A Child: A Tribute to Pier Paolo Pasolini.

The title of the song My Kingdom For A Horse (from the 2006 album Armageddon Gigolo) is taken directly from a famous line in Shakespeare's play Richard III: "A horse, a horse, my kingdom for a horse."

The final track of Armageddon Gigolo, entitled Redemption Or Myself features a background track playing part of The Shangri-Las' Give Us Your Blessings.

== Controversies ==
=== Announcements and cancellation of concerts in Russia ===
On 10 November 2023, vocalist Simone Salvatori announced two concerts in Saint Petersburg and Moscow, Russia, to be held on the 14th and 16th of May, 2024 (respectively), amidst the Russian invasion of Ukraine. In response, the band received heavy criticism and an immediate cancellation of concerts in Vilnius, Warsaw, Tbilisi, Almaty and Istanbul. Facing criticism from fans, including Ukrainians, the band deleted the announcements and cancelled both concerts in Russia.

== Discography ==
=== Albums ===
- Songs for The Will - (1999)
- Nihilist Cocktails for Calypso Inferno - (2001)
- Armageddon Gigolo - (2006)
- Rotten Roma Casino - (2010)
- Open Wounds - (2013)
- Black Hearts in Black Suits - (2013)
- Amour Braque - (2018)
- The Queen Is Not Dead - (2023)

=== Singles ===
- Twin a Tin Tin Towers - (2002)
- No Kisses on the Mouth - (2003)

=== EPs ===
- Nihilist EP - (2003)
- Slave/Cruisin'/Ragged Bed - (2007)

=== Collaborative releases ===
- Satyriasis - (2005; with Ordo Rosarius Equilibrio)
- Bedtime/Badtime - (2005; with Naevus)
- Twin Horses - (2014; with Lydia Lunch)

=== Compilation albums ===
- Angel of Ashes: a Tribute to Scott Walker - (2006)
- Songs for a Child: A Tribute to Pier Paolo Pasolini - (2009)
