= Trisol Music Group =

Record label

Trisol Music Group GmbH
- Genre: Various
- Country of origin: Germany
- Location: Dieburg
- Official website: trisol.de

The Trisol Music Group GmbH (or Trisol), is a German business group and record label headquartered in Dieburg. Owning multiple sublabels, they specialize in producing musical works pertaining to darkwave, dark folk, gothic rock, deathrock, ethereal wave and other gothic genres of music. (Though there are exceptions to this, as Trisol also publishes for musical artists who perform black metal, synthpop, noise music, EBM, Neue Deutsche Härte, dark ambient, neofolk, horror punk, experimental, etc.) In general they are considered a major European label for works within the realm of Dark Alternative music.

== Sublabels ==
- Apocalyptic Vision
- Armageddon Shadow
- Electric Starfish
- Iceflower
- Liberation and ecstasy
- Matrix Cube
- Richter Skala
- Sad Eyes
- Weisser Herbst

== Artists ==
- 7th Moon
- Alex Fergusson
- Ancient Ceremony
- ASP
- Attrition
- Autumn Angels
- Black Heaven
- Black Tape for a Blue Girl
- Calandra (A side project of Dust of Basement by Birgitta Behr.)
- Cenobita
- Chamber
- Charlie Clouser
- Christian Death
- Cinema Strange
- Clan of Xymox
- C02
- DBS
- Die Form
- Die My Darling
- Dope Stars Inc.
- Emilie Autumn
- Ext!Ze
- Garden of Delight
- The Girl & The Robot
- Janus
- Kirlian Camera
- L'Âme Immortelle
- London After Midnight
- Lore
- Mantus
- Moi dix Mois
- MÜLLÉR OF DEATH!
- Nachtmahr
- Ostara
- Perfidious Words
- Persephone
- Pilori
- Project Pitchfork
- Punto Omega
- Rome
- Rosa CRVX
- Rotersand
- Saddolls
- Samsas Traum
- Santa Hates You
- Schwarzer Engel
- Sopor Aeternus & the Ensemble of Shadows (Sub-Label: Apocalyptic Vision)
- Spectra Paris
- Sieben
- Spiritual Front
- The Candy Spooky Theater
- The Deadly Ensemble
- Tying Tiffany
- Vukovar (band)
- We Are Temporary
- Wolfenmond
- XPQ-21
- Zeromancer
