= Amphi Festival =

German music festival

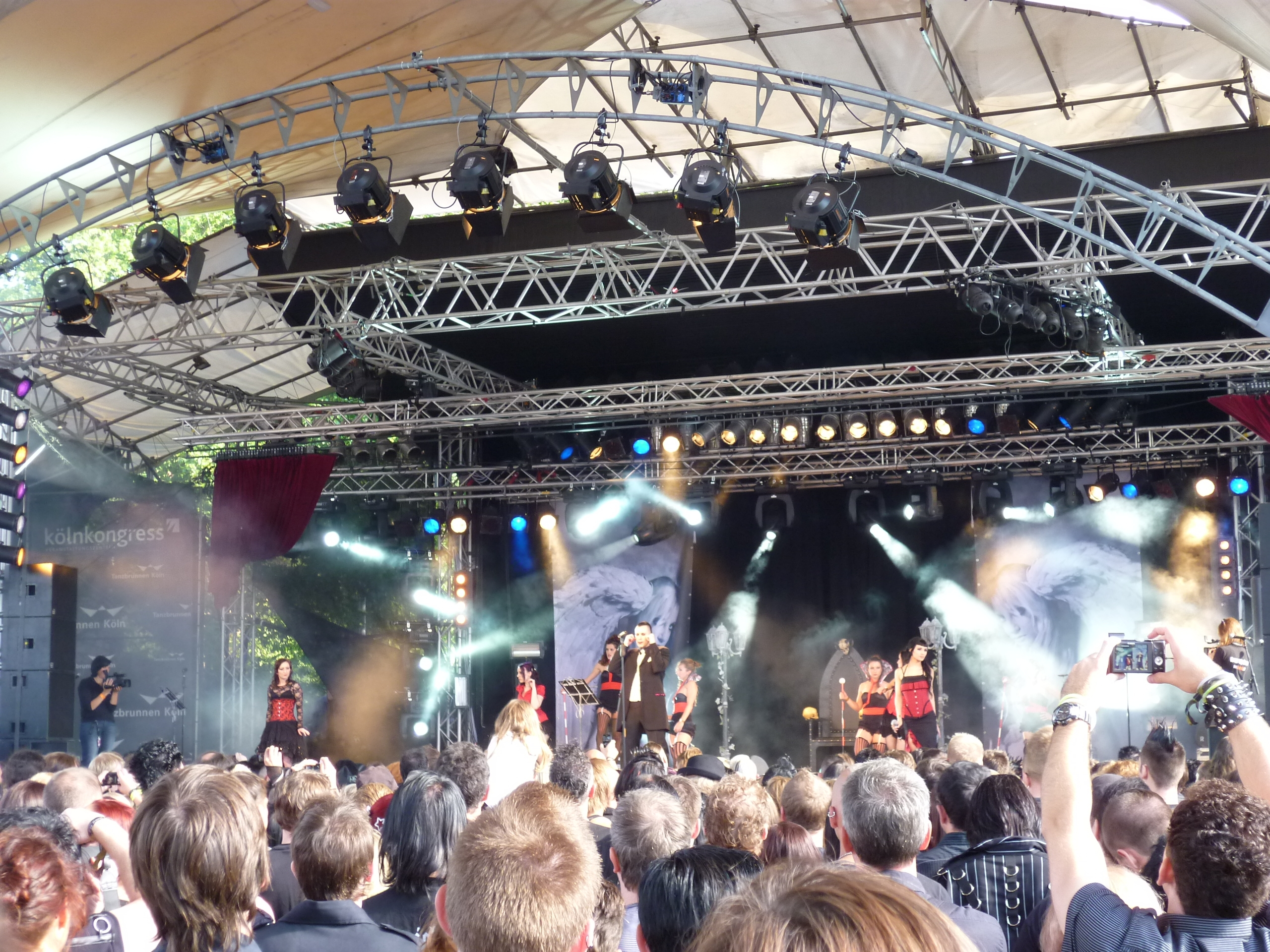
- Blutengel live at the Amphi festival 2010 in Cologne
- Genre: Electro, futurepop, electronic rock, alternative rock, gothic metal, medieval rock, Neue Deutsche Härte, gothic rock
- Dates: Third weekend of July
- Locations: Cologne, Germany; previously Gelsenkirchen, Germany
- Years active: 2005–present
- Founders: Orkus magazine
- Website: amphi-festival.de

The Amphi Festival is a music festival that has been taking place since 2005 featuring a program of alternative, electronic music, and dark music. The number of visitors to the event in 2009 was 13,000 per festival day.

The first Amphi Festival took place in its namesake at the Amphitheater in Gelsenkirchen, Germany but since 2006 the Tanzbrunnen in Cologne has been the site of the two-day festival. Several bands perform both on the covered open-air stage as well as on an indoor stage. The range of artists ranges from electro and future pop to medieval rock and gothic rock. There is also a disco program in the evening as well as readings and theater productions. The theater was used as the indoor stage until 2009 when it was changed to only being used for showing movies and band DVDs or as a disco and the Rheinparkhalle took over the role of the indoor stage for one day until a two-square-meter portion of the ceiling collapsed during the performance by Feindflug. There were no injuries but Laibach's performance was delayed and moved back to the theater.

Orkus magazine is the official sponsor of the festival and releases DVDs of the event in their issues at the end of the year.

== Lineup ==
=== 2005–2009 ===
- 2005: Blutengel, Camouflage, Client, Die Krupps, Goethes Erben, In Extremo, Lacrimas Profundere, Unheilig, Project Pitchfork, Psyche, Staubkind, Suicide Commando, This Morn' Omina, Welle: Erdball, Zeraphine
- 2006: And One, Calmando Qual, Cephalgy, Christian von Aster, Combichrist, Diary of Dreams, DJ Elvis (The Memphis), DJ Mike K., DJ Nightdash + DJ Marco, DJ Oliver Hölz, DJ Ronny, DJ X-X-X, Dope Stars Inc., Faun, Fixmer/McCarthy, Frozen Plasma, Letzte Instanz, Lola Angst, Negative, Oswald Henke, Samsas Traum, Schandmaul, Subway to Sally, The 69 Eyes, The Retrosic (DJ set), This Morn' Omina, Unheilig, VNV Nation, Welle: Erdball
- 2007: Apoptygma Berzerk, ASP, Bloodpit, Diorama, DJ Dalecooper, Down Below, Dreadful Shadows, Eisbrecher, Emilie Autumn, Feindflug, Fetisch:Mensch, Front 242, Front Line Assembly, Funker Vogt, Heimatærde, Imatem, Katzenjammer Kabarett, Krypteria, Mesh, Obscenity Trial, P·A·L, Portion Control, Saltatio Mortis, Samsas Traum, Sonar, Spetsnaz, Subway to Sally, Trial, Unheilig, Untoten, Winterkälte, Xotox, Zeromancer
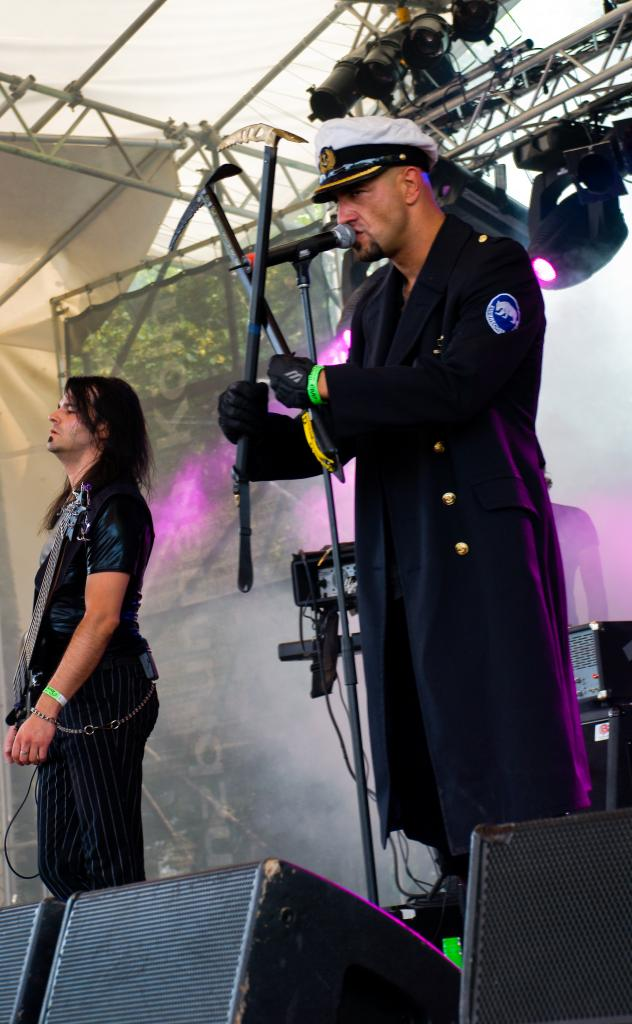
Eisbrecher at the 2007 Amphi Festival

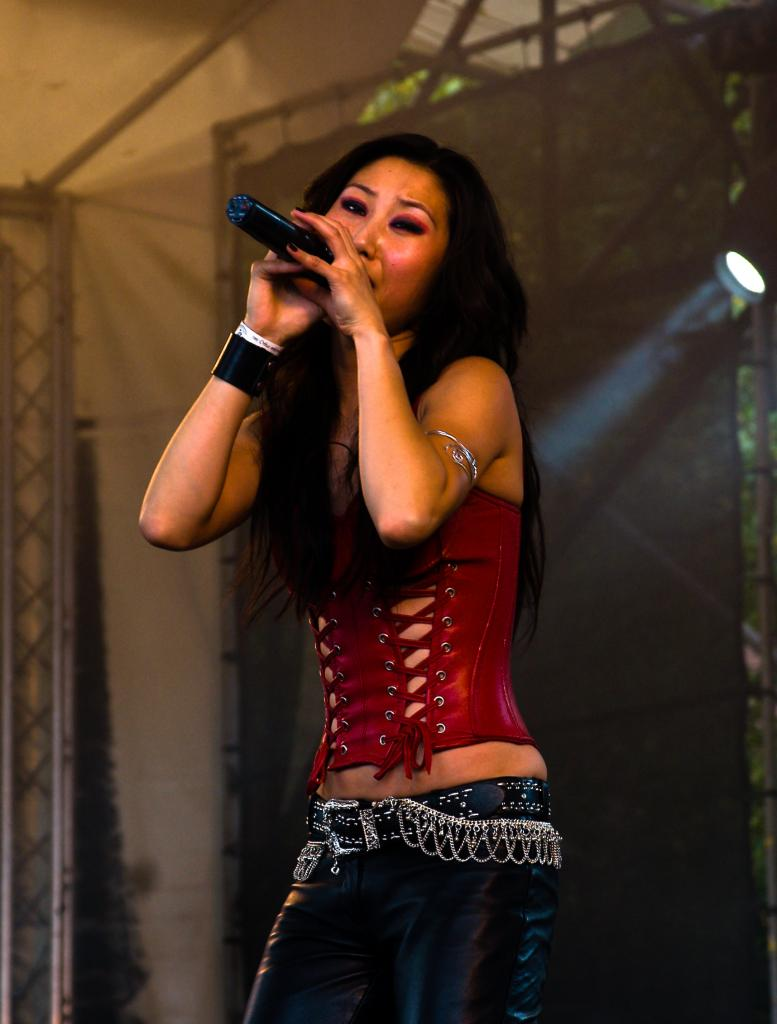
Ji-In Cho at the 2007 Amphi Festival

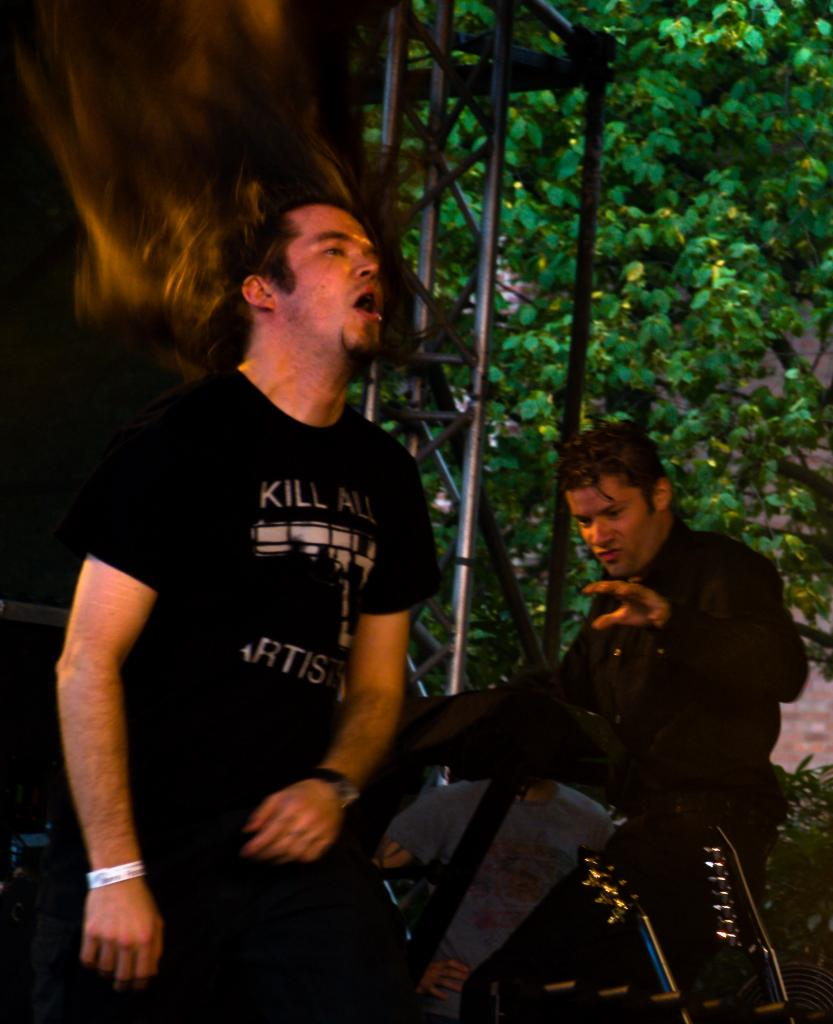
Samsas Traum at the 2007 Amphi Festival
- 2008: And One, Ashbury Heights, Cinderella Effect, Cinema Strange, Clan of Xymox, Combichrist, Covenant, Das Ich, Deine Lakaien, Diary of Dreams, Die Krupps, Eisbrecher, Grendel, Haujobb, L'âme Immortelle, Lacrimas Profundere, Letzte Instanz, Mediæval Bæbes, Mina Harker, Nachtmahr, Noisuf-X, Oomph!, Project Pitchfork, Rotersand, Soko Friedhof, Spectra*Paris, Spiritual Front, Suicide Commando, Tactical Sekt, The Klinik, The Lovecrave, Welle: Erdball, Zeraphine, Zeromancer
- 2009: Absolute Body Control, Agonoize, Auto-Auto, Camouflage, Coppelius, Covenant, Delain, Diorama, Eisbrecher, Feindflug, Fields of the Nephilim, Front 242, Henke, Hocico, Jesus on Extasy, Jäger 90, KMFDM, Laibach, Leæther Strip, Mantus, Marsheaux, Omnia, Panzer AG, Qntal, Rosa Crvx, Saltatio Mortis, Scandy, Solar Fake, The Birthday Massacre, The Other, Unheilig, Xotox

=== 2010–2014 ===
- 2010: And One, Anne Clark, Ashbury Heights, ASP, Blitzkid, Blutengel, Combichrist, Coppelius, Destroid, Diary of Dreams, DIN (A) Tod, Eisbrecher, End of Green, Escape with Romeo, Ext!ze, Faderhead, Frank the Baptist, Front Line Assembly, Funker Vogt, Leaves' Eyes, Letzte Instanz, Mesh, Miss Construction, Mono Inc., Nachtmahr, Project Pitchfork, Rabia Sorda, Samsas Traum, Skinny Puppy, Solitary Experiments, The Crüxshadows, VNV Nation, Welle: Erdball
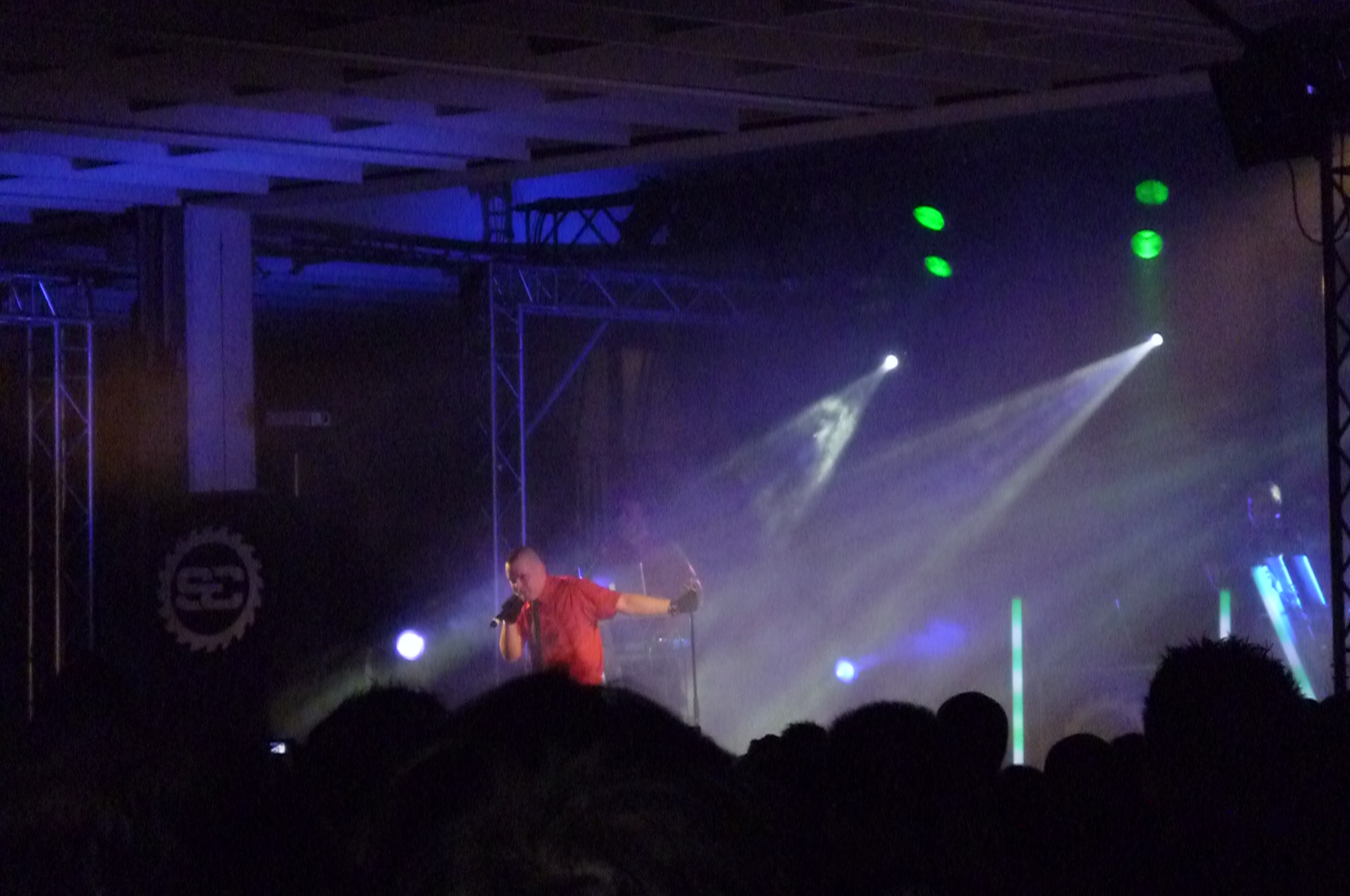
Solitary Experiments at the 2010 Amphi Festival
- 2011: Agonoize, Clan of Xymox, Covenant, Das Ich, Deine Lakaien, Der Fluch, De/Vision, Die Krupps, Diorama, Dreadful Shadows, Feindflug, Frozen Plasma, Funkhausgruppe, Grendel, Hocico, In Strict Confidence, In the Nursery, Kirlian Camera, Klangstabil, Leæther Strip, Melotron, mind.in.a.box, Nitzer Ebb, Ordo Rosarius Equilibrio, Persephone, Rome, Saltatio Mortis, Samsas Traum, She's All That, Staubkind, Subway to Sally, Suicide Commando, Tanzwut, Winterkälte, [x]-Rx, Zeraphine
- 2012: 18 Summers, Aesthetic Perfection, A Life Divided, And One, Apoptygma Berzerk, Assemblage 23, Blutengel, Camouflage, Combichrist, Conjure One, Coppelius, Corvus Corax, DAF, Eisbrecher, Eisenfunk, Eklipse, Haujobb, Henke, Lord of the Lost, Love Is Colder Than Death, mind.in.a.box, Mono Inc., Nachtmahr, Project Pitchfork, Schöngeist, Seabound, SITD, Solar Fake, Spetsnaz, Spiritual Front, Stahlzeit, The Crüxshadows, The Other, The Sisters Of Mercy, The Wars, Tyske Ludder, Whispers in the Shadow, [x]-Rx
- 2013: Agonoize, Alice Neve Fox, Alien Sex Fiend, A Life Divided, Anne Clark, Atari Teenage Riot, Ben Ivory, Chrom, De/Vision, Diary of Dreams, Die Form, Dunkelschön, Escape with Romeo, Fabrik C, Faderhead, Faun, Fields of the Nephilim, Frozen Plasma, Funker Vogt, Grendel, Icon of Coil, Letzte Instanz, Oomph!, Peter Heppner, Phillip Boa and the Voodooclub, Rome, Rosa Crvx, Santa Hates You, Solitary Experiments, Stahlmann, Suicide Commando, Tanzwut, The Beauty of Gemina, Tyske Ludder, Umbra et Imago, VNV Nation, Welle:Erdball, Wesselsky, Xotox, [X]-RX
- 2014: Aesthetic Perfection, Apoptygma Berzerk, Blutengel & The Monument Ensemble, Burn (acoustic), Camouflage, Centhron, Clan of Xymox, Corde Oblique, Corvus Corax, Der Tod, Die Krupps, Ecki Stieg, Eisbrecher, Front 242, Hocico, In the Nursery, Janus, Klangstabil, Lacrimosa, London After Midnight, Lord of the Lost, Maerzfeld, Markus Heitz, Mesh, Midge Ure, Mono Inc., Nachtmahr, Noisuf-X, Persephone, Phosgore, Project Pitchfork, Rotersand, She Past Away, Solar Fake, The Juggernauts, The Klinik, The Neon Judgement, The Exploding Boy, Torul, Unzucht, Vic Anselmo, Zeromancer

=== 2015–2019 ===
- 2015: Aeon Sable, Agonoize, And One, Centhron, Chrom, Combichrist, DAF, Darkhaus, Das Ich, Der Fluch, Diary of Dreams, Diorama, Euzen, Folk Noir, Front 242, Goethes Erben, Henric de la Cour, Inkubus Sukkubus, Lebanon Hanover, Neuroticfish, Oomph!, Patenbrigade:Wolff, Pokémon Reaktor, Qntal, Rabia Sorda, Rome, Samsas Traum, Schöngeist, [:SITD:], Sonja Kraushofer, S.P.O.C.K, Stahlmann, The Birthday Massacre, The Creepshow, The Crüxshadows, The Devil & The Universe, The Mission, VNV Nation, Welle:Erdball, Wesselsky, [X-Rx], Zeraphine
- 2016: Aesthetic Perfection, Angels & Agony, Beyond Obsession, Bloodsucking Zombies from Outer Space, Blutengel, Coppelius, Covenant, Cryo, Laura Carbone, Der Fluch, Dive, Editors, Escape With Romeo, Ewigheim, Faderhead, Front Line Assembly, Joachim Witt, Lebanon Hanover, L'Âme Immortelle, Mantus, Megaherz, Mono Inc., Moonspell, Neuroticfish, Nosferatu, One I Cinema (cancelled due to illness), Ost+Front, Peter Heppner, Project Pitchfork, Solar Fake, Solitary Experiments, Spetsnaz, Spiritual Front, Stahlzeit, Suicide Commando, Tarja, The Beauty of Gemina, The Devil & The Universe, Tüsn, Unzucht, DJ Honey, Whispers in the Shadow, [X]-Rx, XMH, Xotox
- 2017: Aeon Sable, Apoptygma Berzerk, Box & The Twins, Chrom, Clan of Xymox, Combichrist, Das Ich, Diary of Dreams, Die Krupps, Diorama, Eisbrecher, Eisfabrik, Empathy Test, Esben and the Witch, FabrikC, Fields of the Nephilim, Frozen Plasma, Henric de la Cour, Hocico, Holygram, Kirlian Camera, Kite, LEGEND, Letzte Instanz, Lord of the Lost, Lucifer's Aid, Massive Ego, Merciful Nuns, M.I.N.E, Nachtmahr, Near Earth Orbit, Orange Sector, Ordo Rosarius Equilibrio, Rummelsnuff, Stahlmann, Tanzwut, The Daniel Myer Project, The Other, Torul, VNV Nation, We Are Temporary, Winterkälte
- 2018: [:SITD:], [X-Rx], A Projection, Aesthetic Perfection, Agonoize, And One, ASP, Assemblage 23, Centhron, Corde Oblique, ES23, Funker Vogt, Future Lied To Us, Girls Under Glass, Goethes Erben, Grausame Töchter, Grendel, Heldmaschine, In the Nursery, Intent:Outtake, Joachim Witt, KiEw, La Scaltra, Lebanon Hanover, Mad Sin, Midge Ure, Mono Inc., Neuroticfish, Orchestral Manoeuvres in the Dark, Oomph!, Persephone, Priest, Qntal, Rroyce, Scheuber, She Past Away, Solar Fake, Soviet Soviet, Synthattack, The Creepshow, Unzucht, Whispers in the Shadow
- 2019: Agent Side Grinder, Ash Code, Blutengel, Chrom, Coma Alliance, Cryo, Das Ich, Dive, Erdling, Faderhead, Feuerschwanz, Fïx8:Sëd8, Haujobb, Hearts of Black Science, Hell Boulevard, Henric de la Cour, Hocico, Holygram, In Extremo, Jäger 90, Janus, L'Âme Immortelle, Logic & Olivia, Lord of the Lost, Massive Ego, Nachtmahr, Nitzer Ebb, Ost+Front, Pink Turns Blue, Project Pitchfork, Rabia Sorda, Samsas Traum, Schattenmann, Seadrake, Seelennacht, Solitary Experiments, Spark!, The Beauty of Gemina, The Cassandra Complex, Unzucht, Welle:Erdball, White Lies

=== 2020– ===
- 2020: Cancelled due to COVID-19 pandemic
- 2021: Cancelled due to COVID-19 Pandemic
- 2022: Aeon Sable, Aesthetic Perfection, Alienare, Ash Code, Bragolin, Cat Rapes Dog, Chemical Sweet Kid, Der Fluch, Diary of Dreams, Dupont, Eisbrecher, Empathy Test, Erdling, Frozen Plasma, Heldmaschine, In Strict Confidence, Johnny Deathshadow, Joy Division Undercover, Letzte Instanz, London After Midnight, Mesh, Mono Inc., Nachtblut, Perfection Doll, Rome, RROYCE, Samsas Traum, Schwarzschild, She Past Away, [:SITD:], Solar Fake, Sono, Stahlmann, Sturm Café, Suicide Commando, The Birthday Massacre, The Foreign Resort, V2A, VNV Nation, Wisborg
- 2023: A Life Divided, Actors, Bianca Stücker & Mark Benecke, Blitz Union, Calva Y Nada, Centhron, Clan of Xymox, Combichrist, Coppelius, Covenant, Das Ich, Deine Lakaien, Diorama, Fïx8:Sëd8, Front 242, Future Lied To Us, Kite, L'Âme Immortelle, Lebanon Hanover, Lord of the Lost, NNHMN, Oberer Totpunkt, OMD, Potochkine, Qntal, Rabengott, Rue Oberkampf, Selofan, Scarlet Dorn, Schöngeist, Solitary Experiments, S.P.O.C.K, Synthattack, Traitrs, Unzucht, Vanguard, Welle:Erdball, Wesselsky, Whispering Sons, Whispers In The Shadow, Wiegand, Xotox, Zeraphine
- 2024: Alienare, Manntra, Schattenmann, Ost+Front, Hocico, Diary Of Dreams, Project Pitchfork, Eisbrecher, J:DEAD, Soulbound, The Other, Heldmaschine, Faderhead, Solar Fake, Blutengel, AND ONE, Bloody Dead And Sexy, A Projection, Principe Valiente, Minuit Machine, JE T’AIME, Then comes silence, Auger, Deus ex lumina, Ultra Sunn, Girls Under Glass, Henric De La Cour, Kirlian Camera, Blackbook, Die Selektion, T.O.Y., Agent Side Grinder, Neuroticfish, Aesthetic perfection, INDUSTRIAL DANCE VIDEO PROJECT, Ruined Conflict, DARK, The Beauty Of Gemina, Merciful Nuns, Heppners Tanzzwang, Goethes Erben
- 2025: Vlad in Tears, Hell Boulevard, Eisfabrik, Bloody Dead And Sexy, GULVØSS, Nachtblut, DUCTAPE, UNIFY SEPARATE, Letzte Instanz, The Nosferatu, REIN, Die Krupps, TRAITRS, Ashbury Heights, Camouflage, Xandria, Rome, VNV Nation, Spiritual Front, SKYND, Auger, INDUSTRIAL DANCE VIDEO PROJECT, Erdling, X-RX, The Second Sight, DUNKELSUCHT, Stahlmann, ALIEN VAMPIRES, Wisborg, Suicide Commando, ABU NEIN, Maerzfeld, Oomph!, QUAL, Klangstabil, Anne Clark, Sixth June, SITD, Lord of the Lost, She Past Away, Psyclon Nine

== See also ==
- List of electronic music festivals
