= Auger (band) =

British musical duo

- Origin: Northern England, United Kingdom
- Genres: Darkwave, industrial metal, electronic rock
- Years active: 2017–present
- Labels: DarkTunes Music Group, Rebco Records, The Big Chair
- Members: Kyle J Wilson; Kieran Thornton
- Website: auger.band

Auger are a British darkwave and industrial metal duo from Northern England, consisting of vocalist and producer Kyle J Wilson and guitarist Kieran Thornton. Since 2017, the band has released five studio albums through DarkTunes Music Group and their own label The Big Chair, and achieved multiple number-one singles on the German Alternative Charts (DAC).

== History ==
Wilson grew up in a musical environment: his mother was the singer of the British gothic band Faithful Dawn and later of the formation Novus:UK, exposing him to gothic and industrial music from an early age.

Wilson and Thornton attended the same school in Northern England but did not meet until years later, when Wilson joined a band in which Thornton was already playing. Bonding over a shared enthusiasm for bands such as the Sisters of Mercy and Fields of the Nephilim, they began writing original music and formed Auger as a duo in July 2017.

Their debut single "New Life" / "My Guardian", released on the British label Rebco Records, quickly sold out and received radio airplay as far as North America. After "My Guardian" appeared on the compilation Goth Music Orgy, Vol. 4 by DarkTunes Music Group, the band signed a three-album deal with the German label.

The debut album The Awakening was released in April 2018 via the distributor Soul Food. In the same year, the band performed in seven different countries, including Estonia. It was followed by From Now On I (June 2019) and Insurgence (May 2020). The single "Find My Own Way Out" reached number one on the German Alternative Charts in 2019; the title track single "Insurgence" also reached number one in 2020, while the album Insurgence peaked at number two.

During the COVID-19 pandemic, the band released several singles in 2021 and performed livestream concerts. Wilson left his career as a graphic designer to focus entirely on music. In October 2021, they launched their own label, The Big Chair, to self-release their material.

The fourth album Nighthawks was released in April 2022 and is named after the painting Nighthawks by Edward Hopper. Wilson described the album as cinematic and influenced by Tears for Fears and Supertramp. The album featured guest vocalist Chris Harms (Lord of the Lost) on the single "Holding On" and Imogen Evans on "As the World Falls Apart". Nighthawks received positive reviews from multiple publications; Elektro Vox rated it 8.6 out of 10, calling it "an immaculate and beautifully crafted display of talent", while Onyx Music Reviews described it as "most definitely Auger's most definitive album to date". Epitome of Epic called the album "a feat that most acts could only dream of following in terms of creative scale".

In 2023 and 2024, the band released further singles and performed at the Amphi Festival in Cologne and the Nocturnal Culture Night festival.

The fifth studio album The Old Arcade, comprising 14 tracks, was released in May 2026. Wilson described it as a summation of eight years of band experience and four years of touring.

== Musical style ==
Auger's music combines heavy guitars with melodic synthesiser elements and 1980s influences. The band describes their sound as "hyper melodic, dynamic Dark Rock, fusing Electro Industrial & Metal". Musical reference points include Lord of the Lost, Blutengel, Project Pitchfork, Mesh, Type O Negative, Gothminister and Eisbrecher.

Wilson has cited Tears for Fears, the Sisters of Mercy and Rammstein as central influences. Lyrically, the band's output is consistently personal, addressing themes of self-discovery, loss and inner strength. Critics have noted the band's ability to traverse a wide range of styles within the alternative spectrum; Epitome of Epic observed that "the duo have managed to break down the boundaries of genre definitions and create an album that travels the entire alternative spectrum".

== Collaborations ==
In 2019, Auger contributed a guest feature to Massive Ego's album Church for the Malfunctioned on the track "Point of No Return". In 2020, the band remixed "Nothing but a Void" by Blutengel and Massive Ego.

== Discography ==
=== Studio albums ===
- The Awakening (2018, DarkTunes Music Group)
- From Now On I (2019, DarkTunes Music Group)
- Insurgence (2020, DarkTunes Music Group)
- Nighthawks (2022, The Big Chair)
- The Old Arcade (2026, DarkTunes Music Group)

=== Selected singles ===
- "New Life" / "My Guardian" (2017, Rebco Records)
- "Find My Own Way Out" (2019; DAC No. 1)
- "Insurgence" (2020; DAC No. 1)
- "My Death" (2020; DAC No. 2)
- "Holding On" (2022; featuring Chris Harms)
- "Fascinate Me" (2024)
- "Where Do We Go?" (2025)
- "Back in Love" (2026)
