= Spetsnaz (disambiguation) =

Spetsnaz are Russian special forces.

Spetsnaz may also refer to:

- Spetsnaz (band), a Swedish band
- Spetsnaz (miniseries), a 2002 Russian TV miniseries
- The special forces of Ukraine

== See also ==
- Spetsnaz GRU, military formations under the control of the military intelligence service GRU
