= Bragolin (band) =

Dutch post-punk and darkwave music project

- Origin: Utrecht, Netherlands
- Genres: Post-punk; Dark wave
- Years active: 2013–present
- Labels: Young & Cold Records
- Members: Edwin van der Velde; Edwin Daatselaar (live)
- Past members: Isolde Woudstra; Maria Karssenberg
- Website: www.bragolin.nl

Bragolin is a Dutch post-punk and darkwave music project founded in Utrecht in 2013 by musician Edwin van der Velde. The project combines elements of post-punk and darkwave with melodic bass guitar, synthesizers, organ sounds and guitar textures. Its lyrics and visual imagery draw on horror and post-apocalyptic cinema.

The project's debut album, I Saw Nothing Good So I Left, was released in 2018. Its track "Into Those Woods" became one of Bragolin's best-known songs and surpassed ten million streams on Spotify in 2025.

== History ==
=== Formation and early releases ===
Edwin van der Velde began Bragolin in Utrecht in 2013. The project's first song, "Into Those Woods", originated as a guitar riff intended for his Dutch-language project Zwarte Poëzie. After purchasing a Bass VI guitar, van der Velde adapted the riff for the instrument, developing the sound that became the basis of Bragolin.

The debut album, I Saw Nothing Good So I Left, was released in 2018. The track "Into Those Woods" became particularly popular within the international gothic and darkwave scenes. The album was subsequently reissued on vinyl several times.

In 2019, van der Velde collaborated with Dutch electronic musician Adam Tristar on the album Let Out The Noise Inside. The release incorporated a stronger electronic and synthesizer-based sound.

In 2020, synth player Edwin Daatselaar joined Bragolin, forming a live duo with van der Velde. Both musicians are also associated with Zwarte Poëzie.

Bragolin has performed at festivals and venues across Europe and Latin America. Its festival appearances include Wave-Gotik-Treffen, Amphi Festival, Cold Hearted Festival and Grauzone.

=== I Don't Like What It Does to Me ===
On 2 January 2026, Bragolin released "I Run and Hide", its first single in six and a half years. The song was inspired by chase scenes in horror films. Its instrumental arrangement was built from layered clavinet parts rather than guitars, despite its guitar-like sound.

The project's third album, I Don't Like What It Does to Me, was released on 27 March 2026 through Young & Cold Records. The album features a duet with darkwave musician Carrellee on "Feel This Flame Unfold" and a spoken-word contribution by Isolde Woudstra on "I Salute You Ancient Ocean". Its arrangements include Bass VI, organ, synthesizers, field recordings and experimental sound effects.

== Musical style ==
Bragolin's music is rooted in post-punk and darkwave. Van der Velde's songwriting frequently uses melodic Bass VI lines, organ parts and dance-oriented rhythms. The project's arrangements also incorporate synthesizers, guitar textures and atmospheric recordings. The music draws on influences from alternative rock, electronic music and shoegaze.

Horror and post-apocalyptic cinema are recurring influences on the project's lyrics, music videos and visual presentation. Van der Velde has cited films such as The Evil Dead, The Village and The Witch as sources of inspiration.

The project's name refers to Italian painter Giovanni Bragolin, associated with the series of paintings commonly known as The Crying Boys.

== Discography ==
=== Studio albums ===
- I Saw Nothing Good So I Left (2018)
- Let Out The Noise Inside (2019, with Adam Tristar)
- I Don't Like What It Does to Me (2026)
