= Extize =

Franco-german gothic electronic band

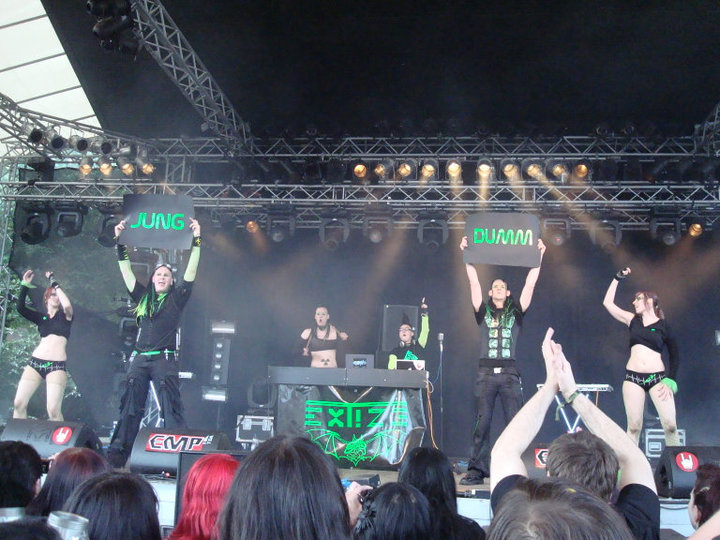
- EXT!ZE live at the Amphi Festival 2010 (Köln, Allemagne)

Background information
- Origin: Heidelberg, Germany
- Genres: Electro-industrial, Aggrotech
- Years active: 2007–present
- Labels: Trisol Music Group, Future Fame
- Members: Cyb3rella; DJ Barus; Jan Dysfunction; Mondi
- Past members: Cyb3rSlut; Cyb3rc0re; Ionic Matrix
- Website: www.extize.com

Extize (EXT!ZE) is a Franco-German gothic electronic band from Heidelberg, Germany. Being the subject of a cover story in Orkus magazine propelled the band to the forefront of the discussion of Germany's Cybergoth culture.

== Discography ==
=== Albums ===
- FallOut Nation (2009/Trisol)
- Paradize 2069 (2011/Trisol)
- Anarchy Engineers (2012/Future Fame)
- Don't Fuck With An Angel (2014/Future Fame)
- Redneck Industrial (2016/darkTunes)
- Hellcome to the Titty Twister Club (2018/darkTunes)
- MonStars (2022/darkTunes)
- DeLorean 666 (2025/darkTunes)

=== Singles ===
- Hellektrostar Ep (2009/Trisol)
- Gothic Pussy (2010/Trisol)
- Arschloch EP (2012/Trisol)

=== Music Videos ===
- Gothic Pussy (2010)
- HeadQuake (2011)
- Freed From Desire (Gala Tribute) (2011)
- Arschloch Alarm (2012)
- Kiss & Kill (2013)

=== Compilations ===
- Extreme Traumfänger 7 (2008)
- Extreme Schwarze Nacht 3 (2008)
- Extreme Störfrequenz 1 (2009)
- Extreme Sündenfall 7 (2009)
- Orkus Compilation 54 (2009)
- Gothic Compilation 65 (2009)
- Sonic Seducer Cold Hands 100 (2010)
- Endzeit Bunkertracks V (2010)
- Amphi Festival 2010 (2010)
- Endzeit Bunkertracks VI (2012)
- Nachtaktiv Sampler Dezember 2012 (2012)
- Nachtaktiv Sampler Februar 2013 (2013)

=== Remixes ===
- Aggressionslevel 4.0 - Laboratory of Joy (EXT!ZE EXTASE-X RMX)
- Genetic Disorder - Anästhetikum (Painless Mix by EXTIZE)
- PS Kabelsalat - Das Ende der Welt (EXT!ZE REMIX FORM H3LL)
- Santa Hates You - Z.O.M.B.I.E (REAN!MATED by EXT!ZE)
- Suono - And the party never dies (HarderLouderStronger RMX by EXT!ZE)
- V2A - Intruder Alert (Dronestep RMX by EXT!ZE)
- V2A - Jesus Loves You (Extize's Raving Christ RMX)
- Weena Morloch - Herz und Faust (F!STED by EXT!ZE)
