= Diorama (band) =

German electropop band

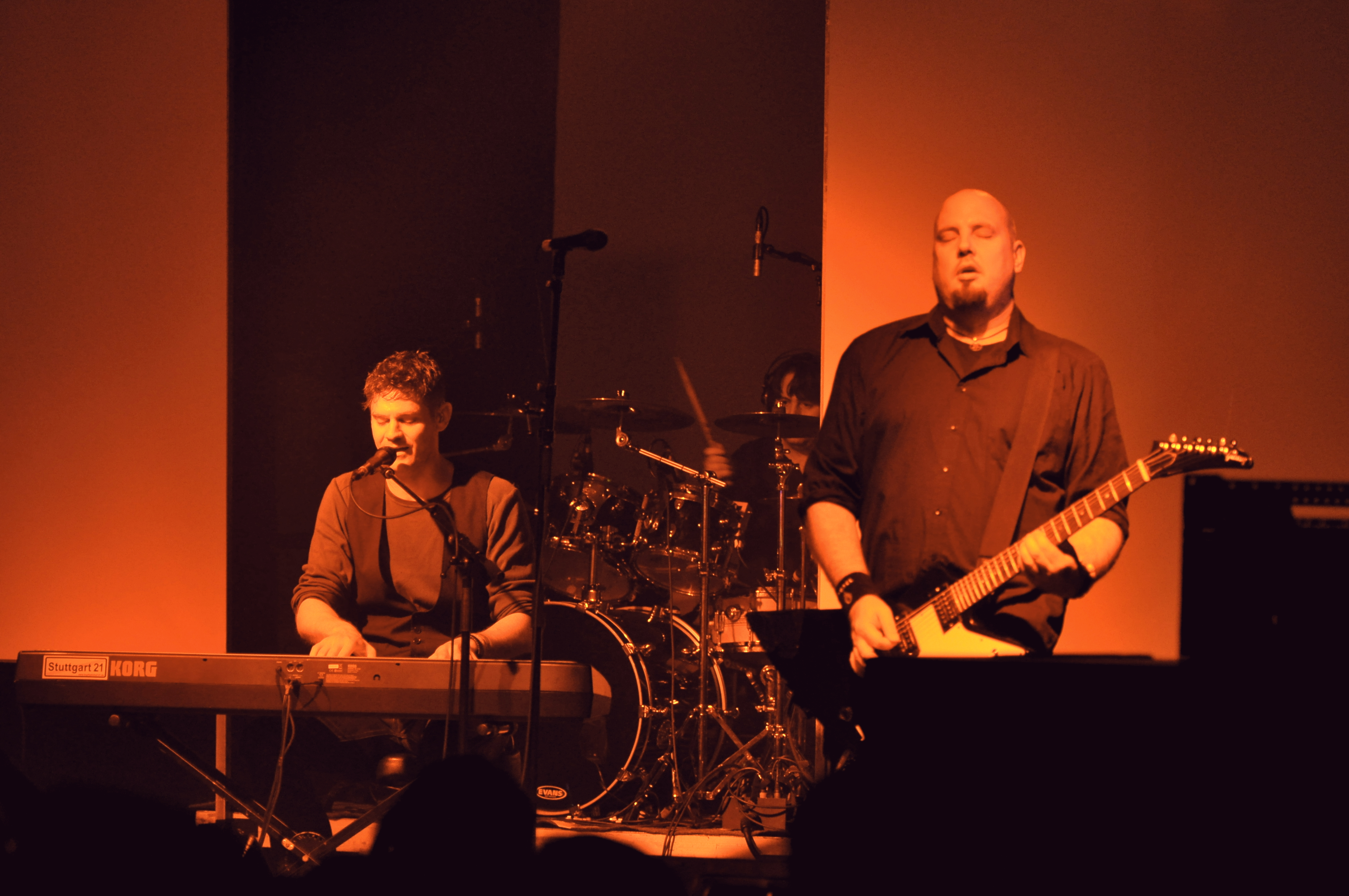
- Torben Wendt (piano) and Sash Fiddler (guitar) at E-tropolis Festival 2013, Berlin

Background information
- Origin: Germany
- Genres: Electropop; Electronic rock EBM; Darkwave (early)
- Years active: 1996–present
- Label: Accession Records
- Members: Torben Wendt, Felix Marc, Zura Nakamura, Markus "Marquess" Halter
- Past members: Bernard Le Sigue, Sash Fiddler

Diorama is a German electropop band. The name of the band is a metaphor which represents their notion of music as an artistic form of expression.

== History ==
Diorama was founded in 1996 as a musical project of Torben Wendt. Torben’s music was soon recognized by Adrian Hates of Diary of Dreams, so with his support and the support of Rainer Assmann (Daf/ Fad Gadget), a debut-album “Pale” was released in 1999. It was received very well both by the critics and the audience.

In 2000, Torben’s friend Felix Marc joined Diorama as a keyboard player, co-producer and backing vocalist. The second album “Her Liquid Arms” was released in April 2001. Despite its stronger rhythms and more forceful electronic sounds, the music preserved its distinctive atmosphere, established with the first album. The song “Advance” became one of the leading club hits and the band was becoming increasingly popular. The second album was followed by club-oriented single “Device” (December, 2001).

Bassist Bernard Le Sigue joined the band the following year, and together with Torben and Felix saw the release of the third album, named “The Art of Creating Confusing Spirits”, the album was released in October 2002. During November and December of the same year, Diorama supported Diary of Dreams on tour.

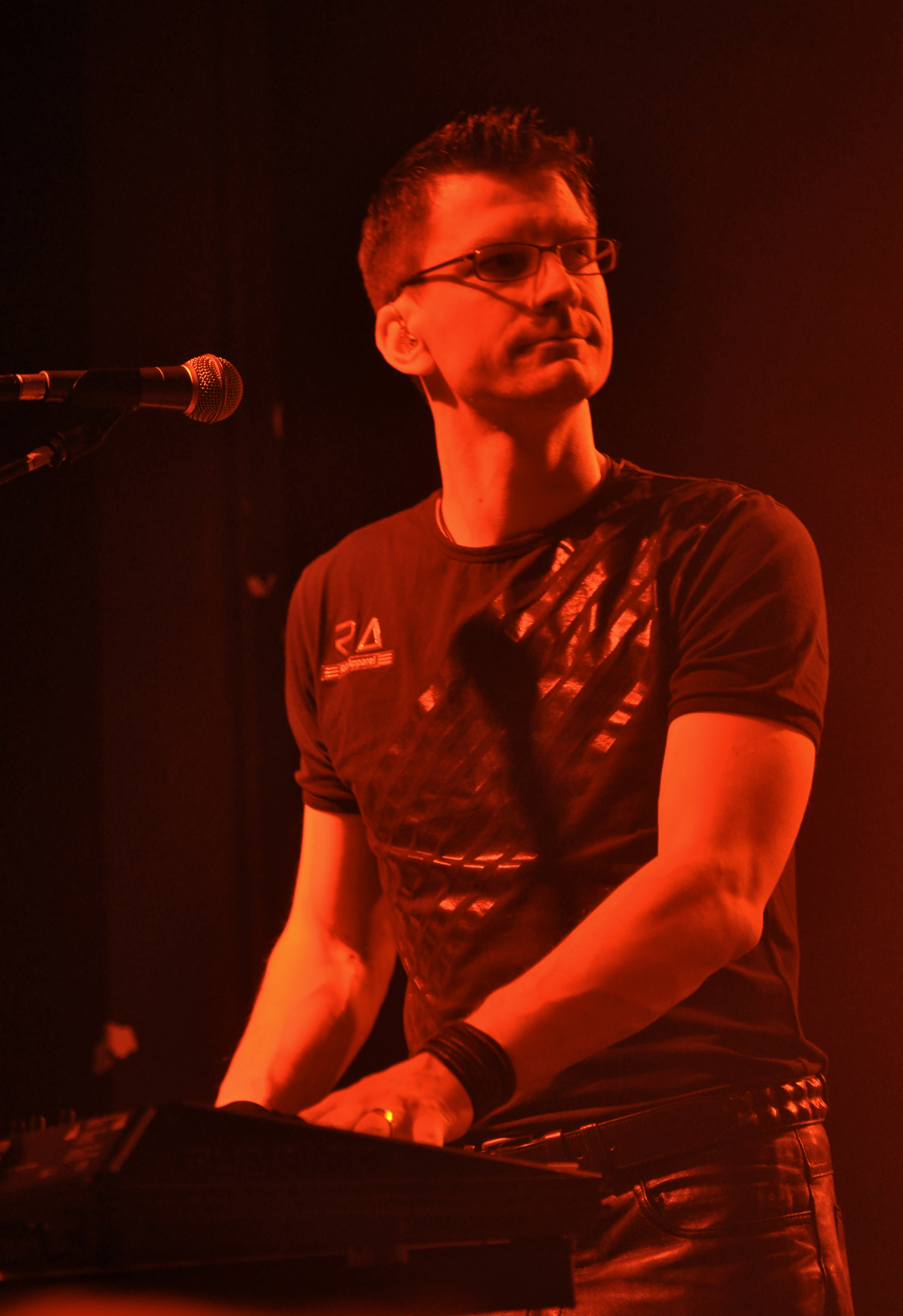
Felix Marc at Keyboards at E-tropolis Festival 2013, Berlin.

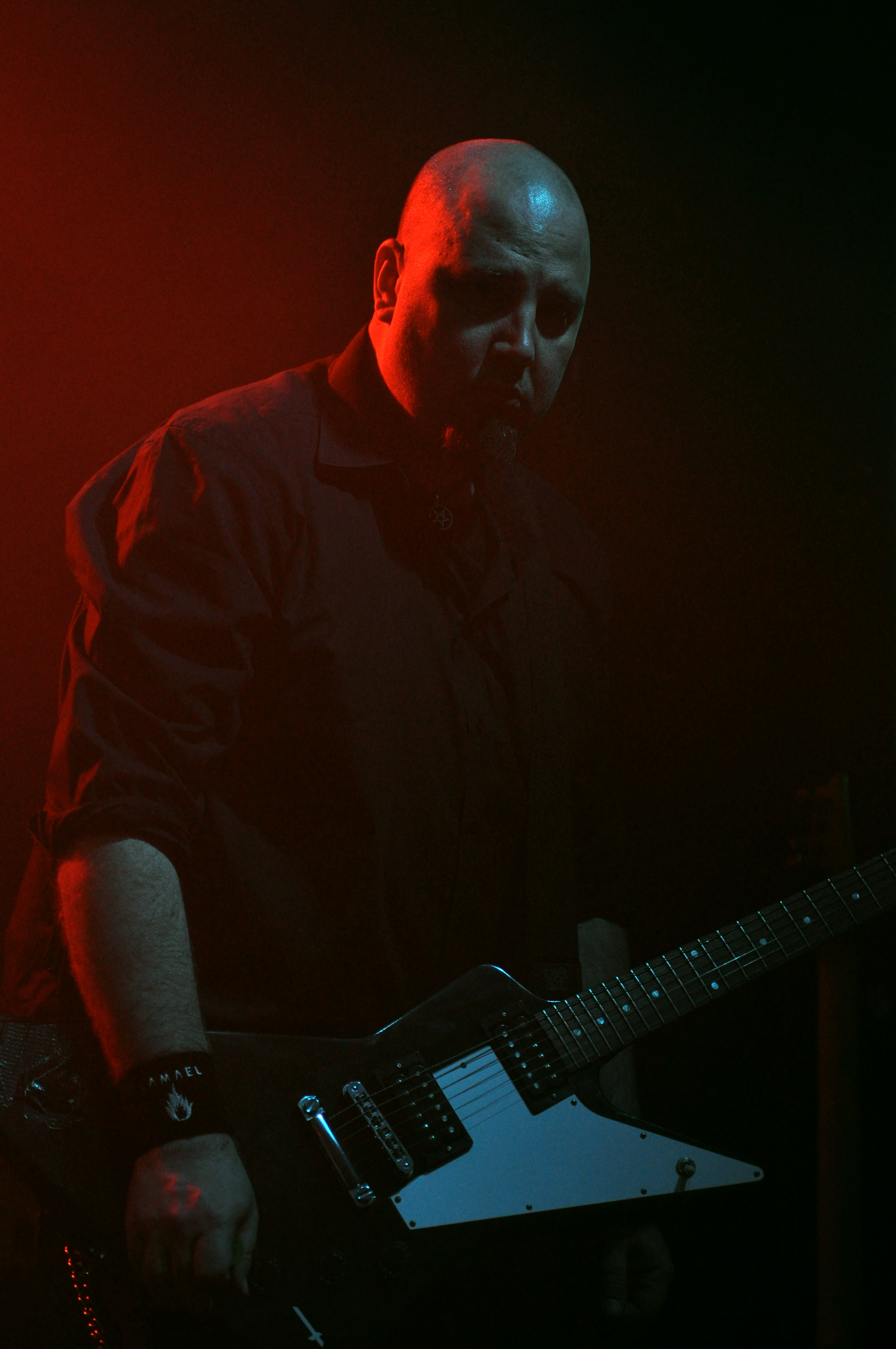
Sash Fiddler at E-tropolis Festival 2013, Berlin.

After a long break and another addition to the band’s line-up (guitar player Sash Fiddler joining in 2003), the long-awaited fourth album "Amaroid" was released in April 2005. For the promotion of the new album, the band joined VNV Nation, on their “Formation” tour. In October 2005, Diorama released two more albums: A re-release of their first album “Pale”, with three new songs (“Don’t Be There”, “You and Ice” and “Crop of Illusions”); and “Re-Pale” – a collection of new versions of earlier songs, remixes and some previously unreleased songs. At the same time, the band went on their first headline tour throughout Germany.

At the end of 2006, Bernard Le Sigue left the band. On 23 February 2007, a new single was released: “Synthesize Me”, a prelude for the next album, which was released 4 weeks later. “A Different Life” can be characterized as a criticism of the society ruled by artificial, deviant system of values. With his lyrics, Torben portrayed the revolt of the individual against the imposed principles and general degradation of true values and virtues.

"Cubed" is their seventh studio album (released on 19 March 2010). The figurative picture of a cube is the guiding theme of the album - a confined area serving as a living space be it as a stage, as a prison or as a shelter. This concept consequently features throughout the band's artwork and stage setting. This album climbed in German Alternative Charts (DAC of week 16/2010) to the top position.

The members of Diorama have collaborated with a number of bands, including Diary of Dreams, Angels & Agony, Painbastard, Klangstabil and Frozen Plasma.

== Style ==
Diorama are often labeled as "EBM", “Electro-Pop”, “Future Pop” or “Darkwave” (particularity on the albums "Her Liquid Arms" and "Pale"). The melodies can be fast-paced and backed by rhythms and can be melancholic ballads. The diapason of the lyrics’ motifs takes inspiration from the inner world of the writer himself (Torben Wendt) and also his surroundings. The lyrics are written in a dark, kafkian style and are often ambiguous. Distinctive playing with words and metaphors is one of the prominent virtues of Diorama’s artistic opus.

== Band members ==
=== Current ===
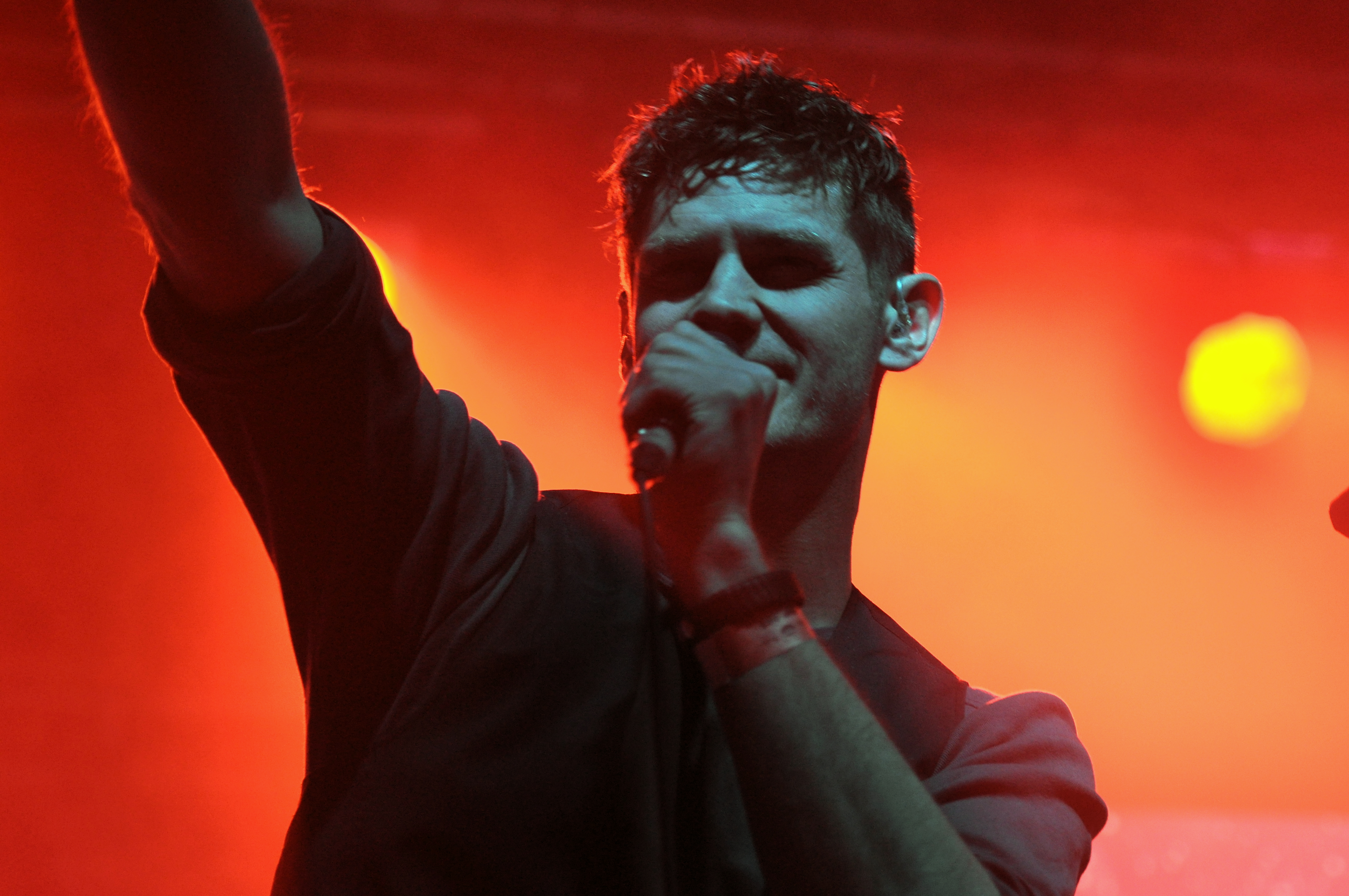
Torben Wendt at E-tropolis Festival 2013, Berlin.

- Torben Wendt – lyrics, vocals, keys, percussion
- Felix Marc – co-production, keys, vocals
- Zura Nakamura – guitars
- Markus "Marquess" Halter – drums

=== Former ===
- Bernard Le Sigue – bass
- Sash Fiddler – guitars

== Discography ==
=== Albums ===
- Pale (1999)
- Her Liquid Arms (2001)
- The Art of Creating Confusing Spirits (2002)
- Amaroid (2005)
- Re-Pale (2005)
- Pale re-release (2005)
- A Different Life (2007)
- Cubed (2010)
- Even the Devil Doesn't Care (2013)
- Zero Soldier Army (2016)
- Tiny Missing Fragments (2020)
- Fast Advance Fast Reverse (2022)
- A Substitute for Light (2026)

=== Singles ===
- Device (2001)
- Synthesize me (2007)
- Child of Entertainment (2010)
