= Xotox =

Solo musical project by Andreas Davids

Xotox is a solo musical project started by Andreas Davids in 1998.

== History ==
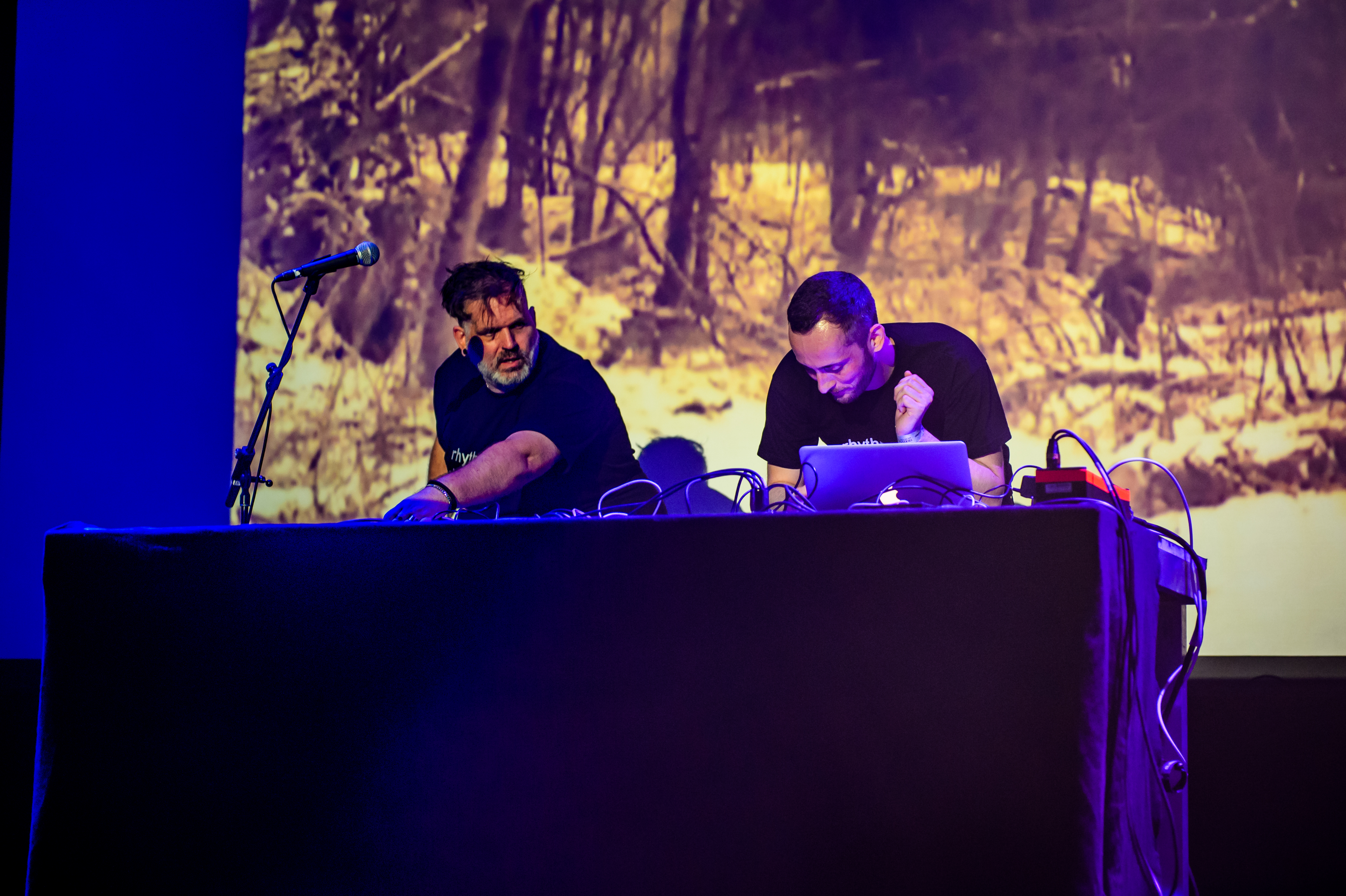
Xotox - Amphi festival 2016

Xotox released several self-published albums from 1998 to 2002, gaining some attention in Germany. After the release of Disinhibition in 2000, the band started performing live at various venues in Germany, attracting media attention and several favourable reviews. In 2002, songs such as eisenkiller and zweischicht went into rotation at numerous clubs in Germany, attracting the attention of the record label Pronoize, which signed them. "Lichtlos", their debut album with Pronoize, was the first album by an industrial act to reach #1 on the Deutsche Alternative Charts.

In 2005, the song [PSI] reached #2 on the DAC. In 2008, the album In Den Zehn Morgen went to #1 on the DAC, staying there for 6 weeks. It included such club hits as habitat and keine ruhe vor dem sturm. In May 2008 "Hyperactive - The Best Of" was released exclusively to North America on the Denver-based Vendetta Music label.

== Discography ==
=== Albums ===
- Stückgut (1999)
- Sünde (1999)
- Epos (1999)
- AntiArt (1999)
- Monolith (2000)
- Disinhibition (2000)
- Der Suizidberater (2000)
- Normalzustand: Angst (2001)
- Rhythm of fear (live in Jena) (2001)
- Xotox Is Remixed By L.o.D. (Re<attack)(2001)
- Silberfieber (2002)
- Indre Stilhed "the silent side of Xotox" (2002)
- Zu hart für's Sauerland (2003)
- Industrielle Zertrümmerung eines Schädels (2003)
- Lichtlos (2003)
- Die Unruhe (2004)
- [PSI] (2005)
- Dokumentation 1: Ton (2006)
- In den zehn Morgen (2008)
- We Are Deaf (2009)
- Die Unruhe 2.0 (2010)

=== Singles ===
- Industrielle Zertrümmerung Eines Schädels (2002)
- Nothing (2003)
- Suicide/Exit

=== Compilations ===
- Influx #1 (2001)
- Hyperactive: The Best Of (2008)
