= Orkus =

German music magazine

Orkus is a monthly German music and culture magazine published by the Zoomia Media Group. Despite its subtitle ("Gothic - romantic - industrial - electro") and its web tagline ("Das Magazin fur Dark Rock-Electro-Gothic Rock-Dark Metal & More"), it includes all popular music genres including metal, medieval rock, Neue Deutsche Härte, alternative rock, electro and futurepop. The gothic rock, dark wave and industrial music genres have had only a minor presence since the late 1990s.

== History ==
The magazine was established in 1995 by Claus Müller and was released for free in A5 format. The focus was initially on new wave, gothic rock, electro, and industrial music. With the third edition in May 1996, the magazine was published for a fee and in A4 format. Since 1997, the focus has shifted increasingly to heavy metal. However, other genres such as Goa trance, intelligent dance music, ambient, drum and bass, and techno, are represented in the magazine.

Each month has a goth-related cover, often featuring a semi-nude female model.

It is generally considered one of the top three music magazines in Germany, along with Zillo and Sonic Seducer.

Orkus is the official sponsor of the Amphi Festival and releases DVDs of the event in their issues at the end of the year.

== Content ==
In addition to interviews, concert reports, short portraits, and reviews, particularly from death metal, dark metal, and black metal, there are articles unrelated to music, such as illustrated reports on cemeteries and a series on mysticism in everyday life. There are also columns by musicians (Oswald Henke, Alexander Kaschte) and pages with poems from readers.

Each issue came with a CD with new tracks and remixes from the bands featured in the magazine until March 2020.

Its compilation CD Orkus Collection 2 made it to #1 on the 2002 Deutsche Alternative Charts.
