= Erdling =

German rock band

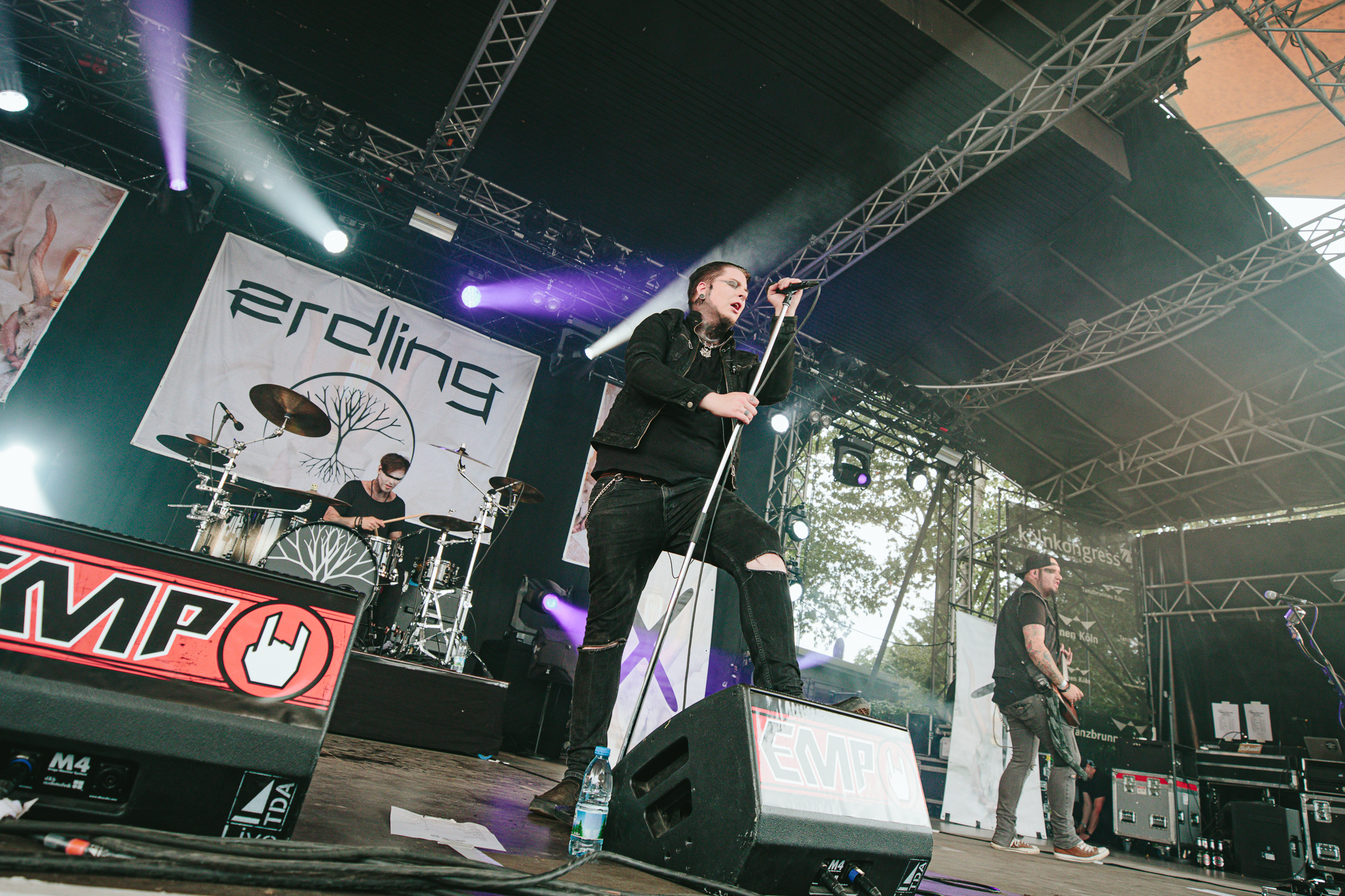
- Erdling at the Amphi Festival 2019

Background information
- Origin: Essen, Germany
- Genre: Neue Deutsche Härte
- Years active: 2014–present
- Label: Out of Line
- Members: Neill Freiwald; Christian Schäfer; Robin Sem Vedrfölnir; Ole Enders
- Past members: Marco Politi; Niklas Kahl; Nate Pearson; Anders Pierre; Christian Eichlinger; Neno Knuckle; Valeria Ereth; Max Nash
- Website: www.erdling.rocks

Erdling (German for "Earthling") is a German Neue Deutsche Härte band formed in 2014 by Neill Freiwald and Niklas Kahl.

== History ==
After guitarist Neill Freiwald left the band Stahlmann and the side project Sündenklang at the end of 2014, ostensibly due to time constraints, drummer Niklas Kahl followed in spring 2015, who, according to his own statement, he can 'identify less and less with the band'.

Together with guitarist Neno and bassist Marco, the first recordings began in the studio of Chris Harms. After Erdling was signed "surprisingly quickly" by Out of Line, according to Neill, they released their first maxi single Blitz und Donner in October 2015, followed by tours with Unzucht and Megaherz.

In January 2016 Erdling released their debut album Aus den Tiefen, in August of the same year they played for the first time at the M'era Luna Festival in Hildesheim. At this gig, the band played for the first time without their bass player Marco Politi, a few days later the band announced that Marco had announced his departure shortly before the festival and had not come to rehearsals, so they had decided on a replacement. On 8 November, Erdling introduced Nate Pearson as the new bassist. Their second album Supernova was released on 17 March 2017. In January 2018, Niklas Kahl, who had switched to Lord of the Lost, was replaced by Christian Eichlinger. In February 2018, Pierre Anders replaced the previous bassist Nate Pearson. At the same time, the band announced their third album, Dämon, which was released in July 2018. On 22 March 2019, Erdling released the single Wir sind Midgard and announced that the fourth album planned for 2020 would be "different, faster, more Metal-heavy, but also deeper". At the same time, the tour dates for the band's second headline tour were announced. In a video blog of his own, Freiwald stated that work on the new album had already started simultaneously with the production of the previous one. He also justified the departure of the bassist Anders for professional reasons. Freiwald will take over the bass himself in the future, so that Erdling will appear as a trio. On 5 July 2019, the second single In Namen der Krähe was released, in which singer Robert Dahn (Equilibrium, Minas Morgul) participated. A short time later, Robin Sem Vedrfölnir was hired as the new bass player. The third single Wölfe der Nacht was released in November 2019, where Chris Pohl (Blutengel) can be heard as a guest singer. Their fourth album Yggdrasil followed on 10 January 2020.

== Members ==
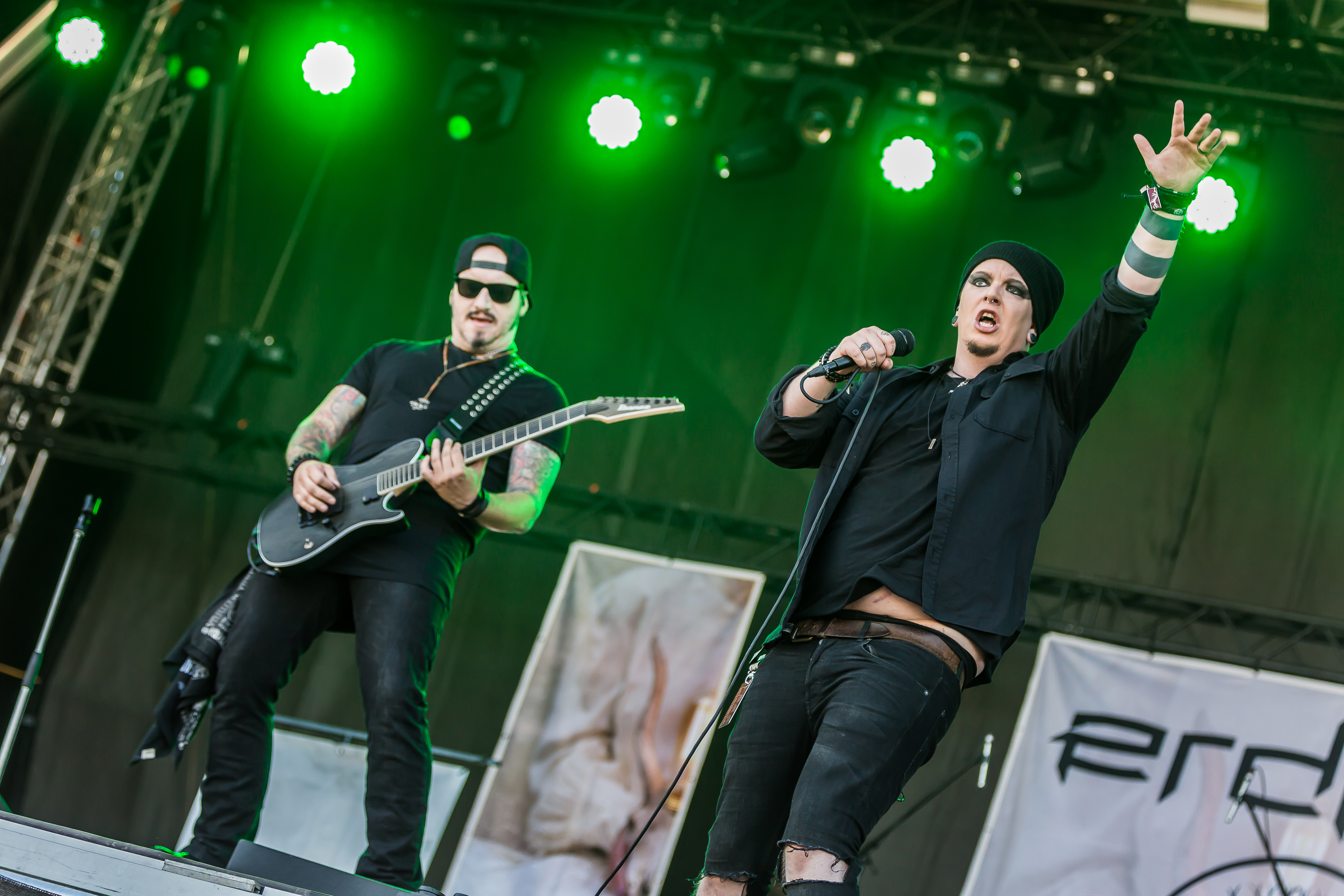
Erdling at Rockharz Open Air 2018

Current members

- Neill Freiwald (Neill Devin) – lead vocals, guitar, programming (2014–present), bass (2019)
- Christian Schäfer – drums (2021–present)
- Robin "Rob" Sem Vedrfölnir – bass

(2019–present)

- Ole Enders -guitar(2024-present)

Former members

- Marco Politi – bass (2014–2016)
- Niklas Kahl – drums (2014–2018)
- Nate Pearson – bass (2016–2018)
- Anders Pierre – bass (2018–2019)
- Christian Eichlinger – drums (2018–2021)
- Neno Knuckle (Ne Djentno) – guitar (2014–2021)
- Valeria "Valy" Ereth (BÖSE FUCHS) – guitar (2021–2024)
- Max Nash – guitar (2021-2024)

== Discography ==
=== Albums ===
Year	Title	Chart positions		
Year	Title	GER	AUT	SWI
2016	Aus den Tiefen ("From the depths")	64	-	-
2017	Supernova	56	-	-
2018	Dämon ("Demon")	43	-	-
2020	Yggdrasil ("Odin's horse / World Tree")	45	-	-
2021	Helheim ("Hel's realm")	66	-	-
2023	Bestia ("Beast")	44	-	-
2025	Mana	-	-	-

=== Singles ===
- 2015: Blitz und Donner (German for "Lightning and Thunder")
- 2016: Mein Element (German for "My Element")
- 2018: Tieftaucher (German for "Deep divers")
- 2019: Wir sind Midgard (German for "We are Midgard")
- 2019: Im Namen der Krähe (German for "In the name of the crow")
- 2019: Wölfe der Nacht (German for "Wolves of the Night")
- 2019: Am heiligen Hain (German for "At the sacred grove")
- 2021: Fimbulwinter (Old Norse for the "Mighty Winter" that precedes Ragnarök)
- 2021: Rabenherz (German for "Raven heart")
- 2021: Götterdämmerung (German for "Twilight of the Gods")
- 2022: DEUS (Latin for "GOD")

=== EPs ===
- 2018: Dämon – The Secret Tracks

=== Music videos ===
- 2015: "Blitz und Donner" on YouTube
- 2016: "Mein Element" on YouTube
- 2017: "Absolutus Rex" on YouTube
- 2018: "Tieftaucher" on YouTube
- 2018: "Wieso Weshalb Warum" on YouTube
- 2018: "Nichts als Staub" on YouTube
- 2019: "Wir sind Midgard" on YouTube
- 2019: "Im Namen der Krähe" on YouTube
- 2019: "Wölfe der Nacht" on YouTube
- 2019: "Am heiligen Hain" on YouTube
- 2020: "Blizzard" on YouTube
- 2021: "Fimbulwinter" on YouTube
- 2021: "Rabenherz" on YouTube
- 2021: "Götterdämmerung" on YouTube
- 2021: "Der Mensch verdient die Erde nicht" on YouTube
- 2022: "Deus" on YouTube
- 2023: "FREIHEIT" on YouTube
- 2023: "Bestia" on YouTube
