= Nachtblut =

German gothic metal band

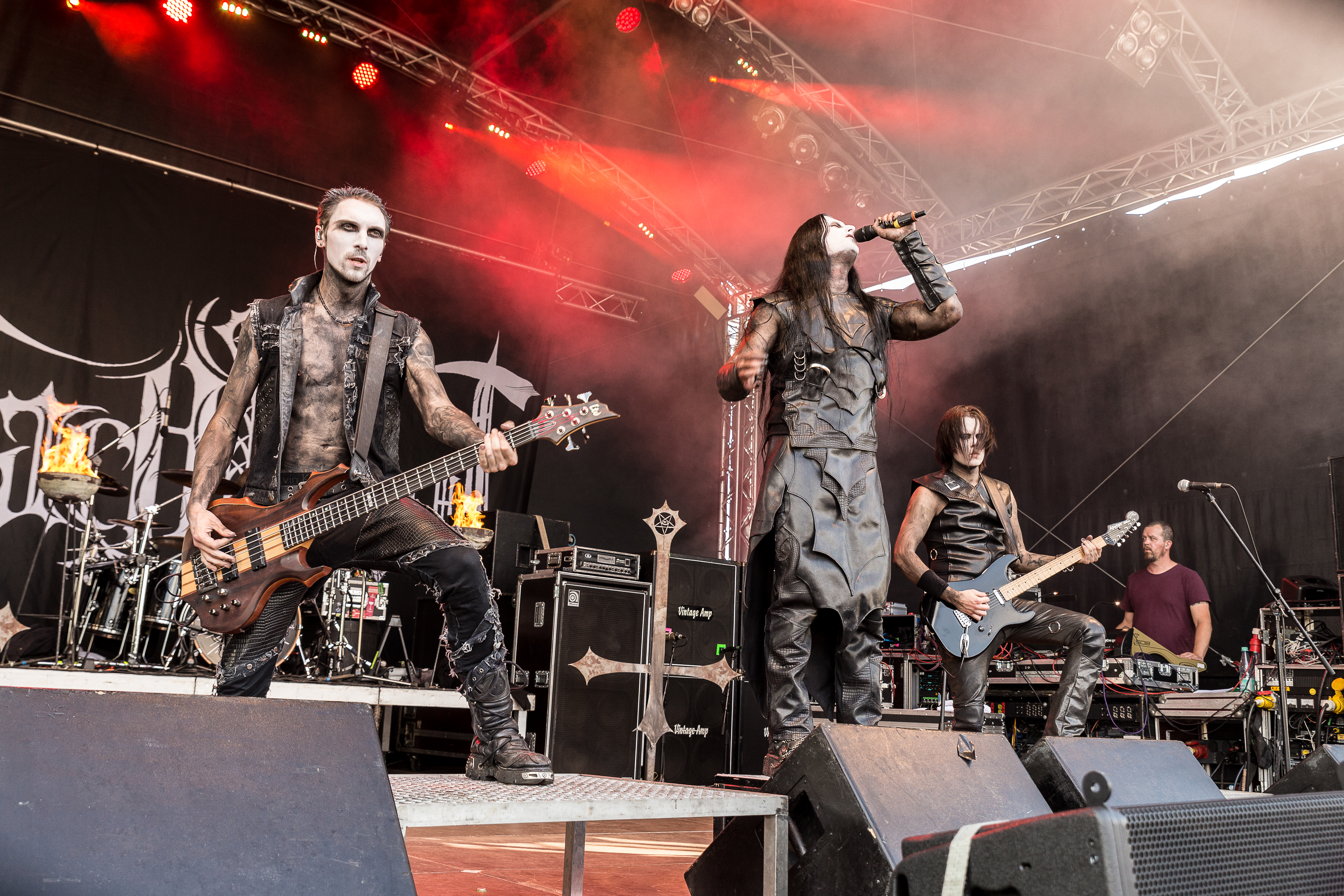
- Nachtblut at Metal Frenzy 2019

Background information
- Origin: Osnabrück, Germany
- Genres: Melodic black metal, gothic metal
- Years active: 2005–present
- Label: Napalm Records
- Members: Askeroth; AblaZ; Skoll; Greif
- Website: nachtblut.com

Nachtblut ("night blood" in German) is a German gothic/melodic black metal band formed in Osnabrück in 2005. They signed a deal with Napalm Records for their third album. In 2013 they performed during Wacken Open Air and Summer Breeze Open Air. In 2014, 2017, and 2022 Nachtblut lined up Wave-Gotik-Treffen festival in Leipzig. To date, Nachtblut has released seven studio albums. In October 2020 Nachtblut released their sixth album called Vanitas; a special edition of the album saw the CD come in wooden box that also featured playing cards, a leather wrist band, and a Satanic certificate, and was limited to 500 copies.

== Members ==
=== Current members ===
- Skoll – drums (2005–present)
- Greif – guitars (2005–present)
- Askeroth – vocals (2005–present)
- Ablaz – bass (2016–present)

=== Former members ===
- Sacerdos – bass, backing vocals (?-2012)
- Lymania – keyboards (2006–2015)
- Trym – bass (2012–2016)
- Amelie – keyboards (2016–2018)

== Discography ==
- Das Erste Abendmahl (self-release, 2007)
- Antik (self-release, 2011 reissued by Napalm Records with bonus material, 2009)
- Dogma (Napalm Records, 2012)
- Chimonas (Napalm Records, 2014)
- Apostasie (Napalm Records, 2017)
- Vanitas (2020)
- Todschick (2025)
