= Heldmaschine =

German rock band

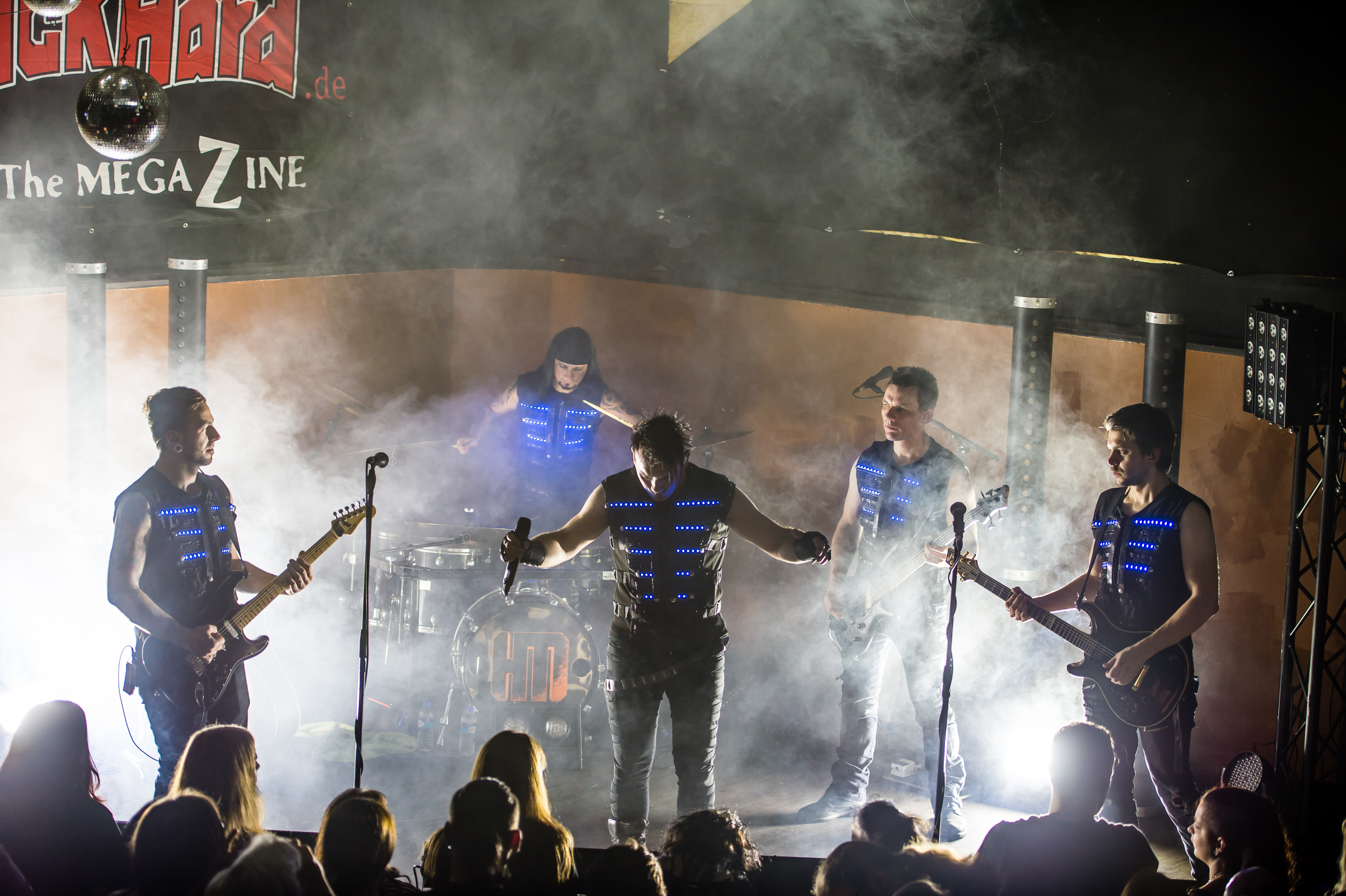
- Heldmaschine performing in 2015

Background information
- Origin: Koblenz, Germany
- Genres: Neue Deutsche Härte, industrial metal
- Years active: 2011–present
- Members: Marco Schulte (bass); René Anlauff (vocals); Tobias Kaiser (guitar/backing vocals); Eugen Leonhardt (guitar/backing vocals); Dirk Oechsle (drums)
- Past members: Tilmann Carbow (bass – until 2013); Andreas Schanowski (keyboard, piano – until 2013); Marco Vetter (guitar, vocals – until 2014); Dejan "Dean" Stankovic (guitar – 2014–2018)
- Website: heldmaschine.de

Heldmaschine (German for "Hero Machine") are a German Neue Deutsche Härte band formed in 2011 in Koblenz as a parallel project from the Rammstein cover band Völkerball (which was founded in 2008).

After releasing their first album of original music, Weichen und Zunder, they decided to change their name for their original releases. In 2013, they changed their name to Heldmaschine but with a line-up change – the brother of singer René Anlauff, Marco Schulte (bass), took over for Tilmann Carbow and Andreas Schanowski. The position of keyboard player was abolished.

== Discography ==
=== Albums ===
- 2012: Weichen und Zunder (Switches and Tinder, released as Völkerball, re-released in 2014 as Heldmaschine)
- 2014: Propaganda
- 2015: Lügen (Lies)
- 2016: Himmelskörper (Heavenly Body)
- 2018: Live und laut (Live and Loud, live album)
- 2019: Im Fadenkreuz (In the Crosshair)
- 2023: Flächenbrand (Wildfire)
- 2025: Eiszeit (Ice Age)

=== EPs ===
- 2019: Volles Brett (Full Board)

=== Singles ===
- 2011: Gammelfleisch (Rotten Meat, from Weichen und Zunder)
- 2012: Radioaktiv (Radioactive, from Weichen und Zunder)
- 2013: Weiter! (Further!, from Propaganda)
- 2014: Propaganda (from Propaganda)
- 2015: Wer einmal lügt (Who Lies Once, from Lügen)
- 2015: Collateral (from Lügen)
- 2016: Sexschuss (Sex shot, Himmelskörper)
- 2020: Radioshow (Non-album track)
- 2021: Lockdown (from Flächenbrand)
- 2023: Sucht (Addiction, from Flächenbrand)
- 2023: Hast Du Angst (Are You Afraid, from Flächenbrand)
- 2023: Monoton (Monotone, from Flächenbrand)
- 2024: Karl Denke (from Eiszeit)

=== Music videos ===
- 2012: Radioaktiv (Radioactive)
- 2013: Doktor (Doctor)
- 2013: Weiter! (Further!)
- 2014: Propaganda
- 2015: Wer einmal lügt (Who Lies Once)
- 2015: Maskenschlacht (Battle of Masks)
- 2016: Sexschuss (Sex shot)
- 2017: Die Braut, das Meer (The Bride, the Sea)
- 2019: Gottverdammter Mensch (Goddamn human)
- 2020: Radioshow
- 2020: Lockdown
- 2023: Sucht (Addiction)
- 2023: Hast Du Angst (Are You Afraid)
- 2023: Monoton (Monotonous)
- 2024: Karl Denke
