= Coppelius =

German cello metal band

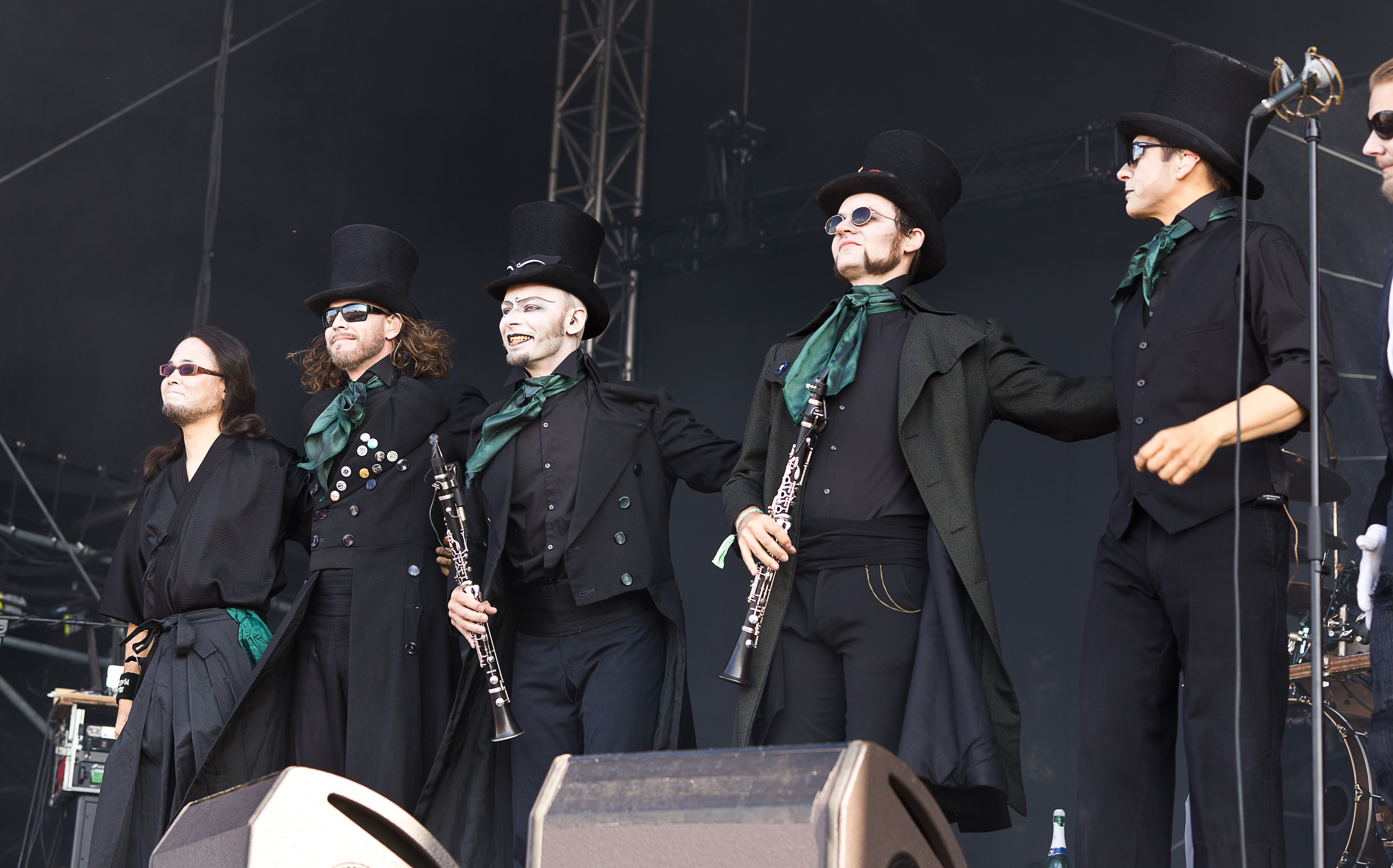
- Coppelius during a concert at Rockharz Open Air 2015 in Germany

Background information
- Origin: Germany
- Genre: Cello metal
- Years active: 1997—present
- Label: F.A.M.E. Recordings
- Members: Max Coppella; Herr Linus von Doppelschlag; Graf Lindorf; Comte Caspar; Sissy Voss; Bastille
- Past members: Nobusama
- Website: http://coppelius.eu

Coppelius is a German band from Berlin that plays metal on drums, double bass, cello, and clarinet. The band's name is taken from E.T.A. Hoffmann's short story "Der Sandmann". Their logo consists of a top hat with the word "Coppelius" underneath. The band is made up of Max Coppella (clarinet and vocals), Comte Caspar (clarinet, vocals, harpsichord), Graf Lindorf (cello, vocals), Sissy Voss (double bass), Herr Linus von Doppelschlag (drums, joined 2019), and Bastille (Butler, vocals). Former band members include Nobusama (drums, left 2018). Additionally, they are often accompanied by Prof. Mosch Terpin (technician and harpsichord). On stage the members of the band wear formal, old-fashioned clothes, inspired mainly by the Victorian era. This era is also an inspiration for a lot of the themes in Copellius' music. For this reason, they are often referred to as a Steampunk band.

== Discography ==
- Albums
  - 2007: Time-Zeit
  - 2009: Tumult
  - 2010: Zinnober
  - 2013: Extrablatt
  - 2015: Hertzmaschine
  - 2019: Kammerarchiv
  - 2023: Abwärts
- EPs
  - 2003: Coppelius
  - 2004: 1803
  - 2005: To My Creator
  - 2005: Frühe Werke (box set of all three EPs)
- Videos
  - 2005: I Get Used To It
  - 2007: Morgenstimmung
  - 2009: Habgier
  - 2010: Die Glocke
  - 2011: Risiko
  - 2012: I Told You So
  - 2013: Spieldose
  - 2015: Moor
  - 2017: Black is the Colour
  - 2019: Zeit & Raum

== Gallery ==
Coppelius live at Wave-Gotik-Treffen 2019

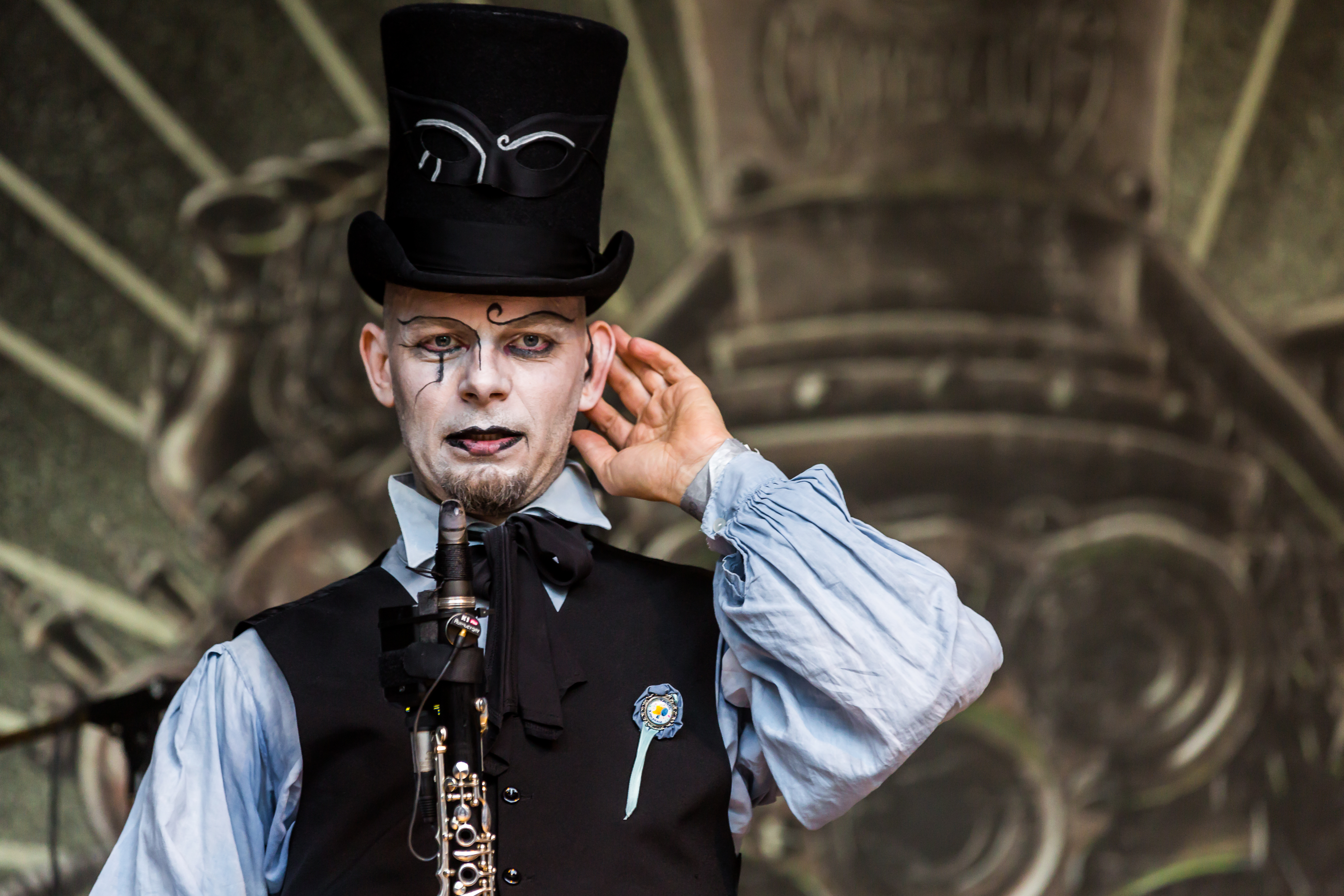
Max Copella

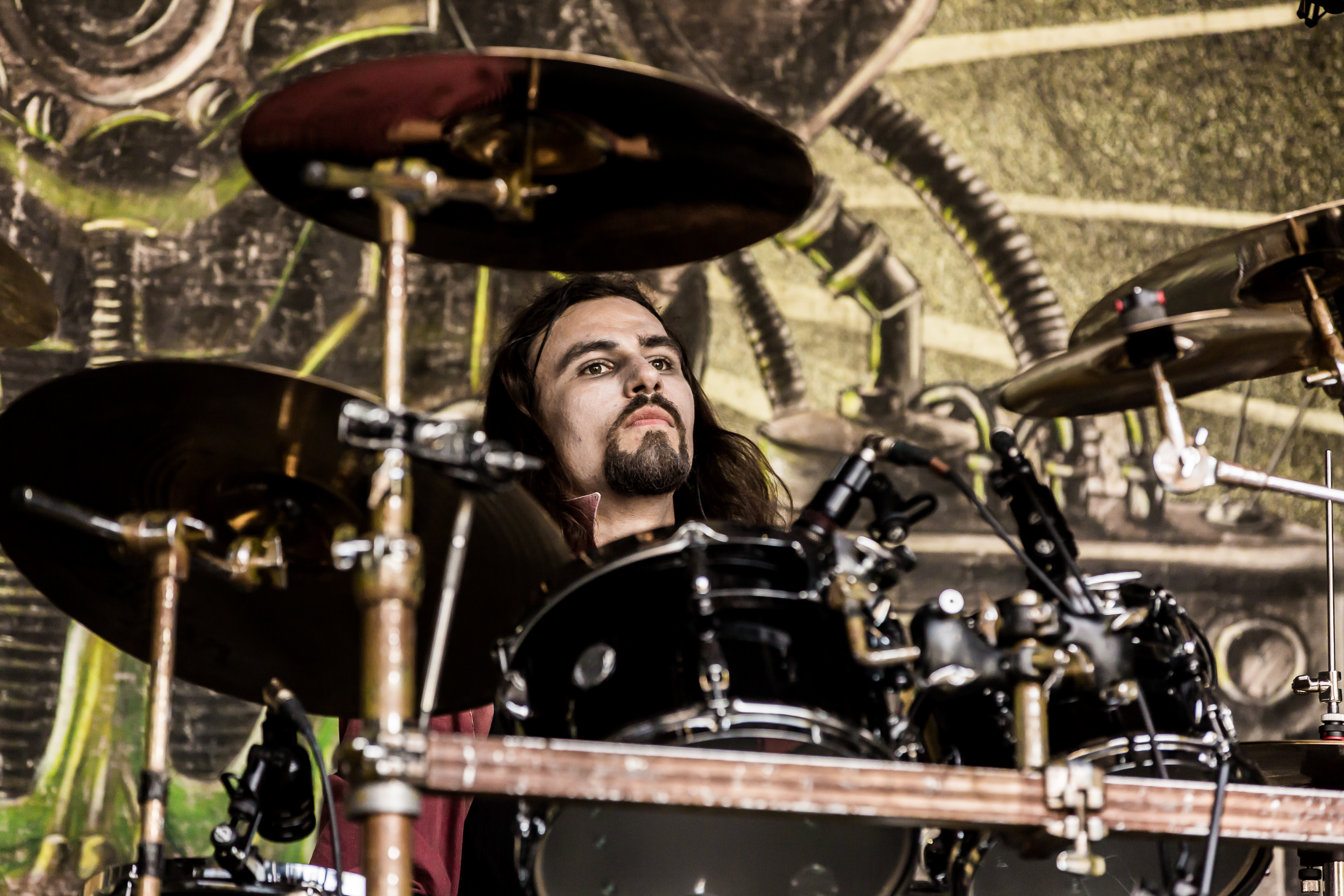
Herr Linus von Doppelschlag

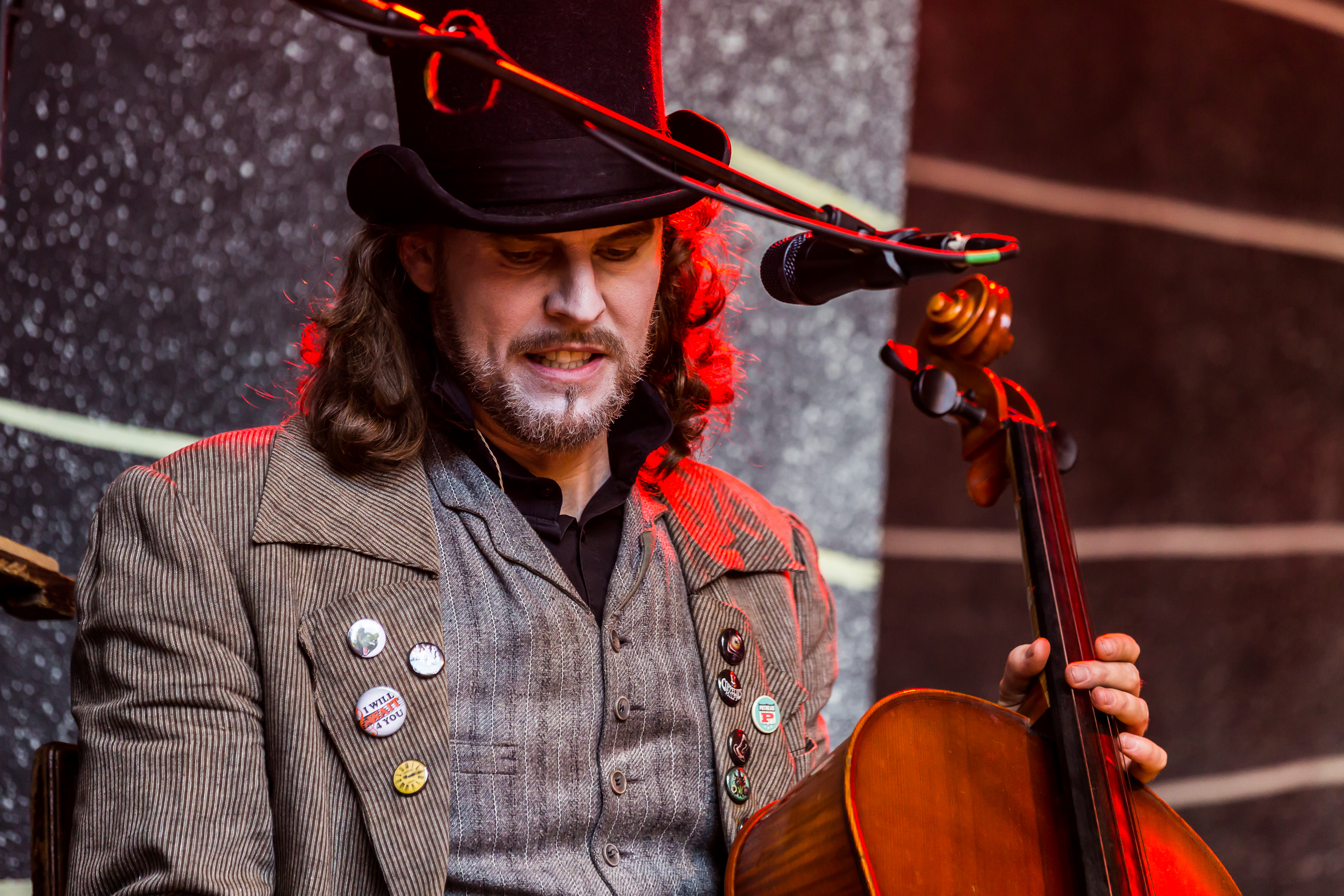
Graf Lindorf

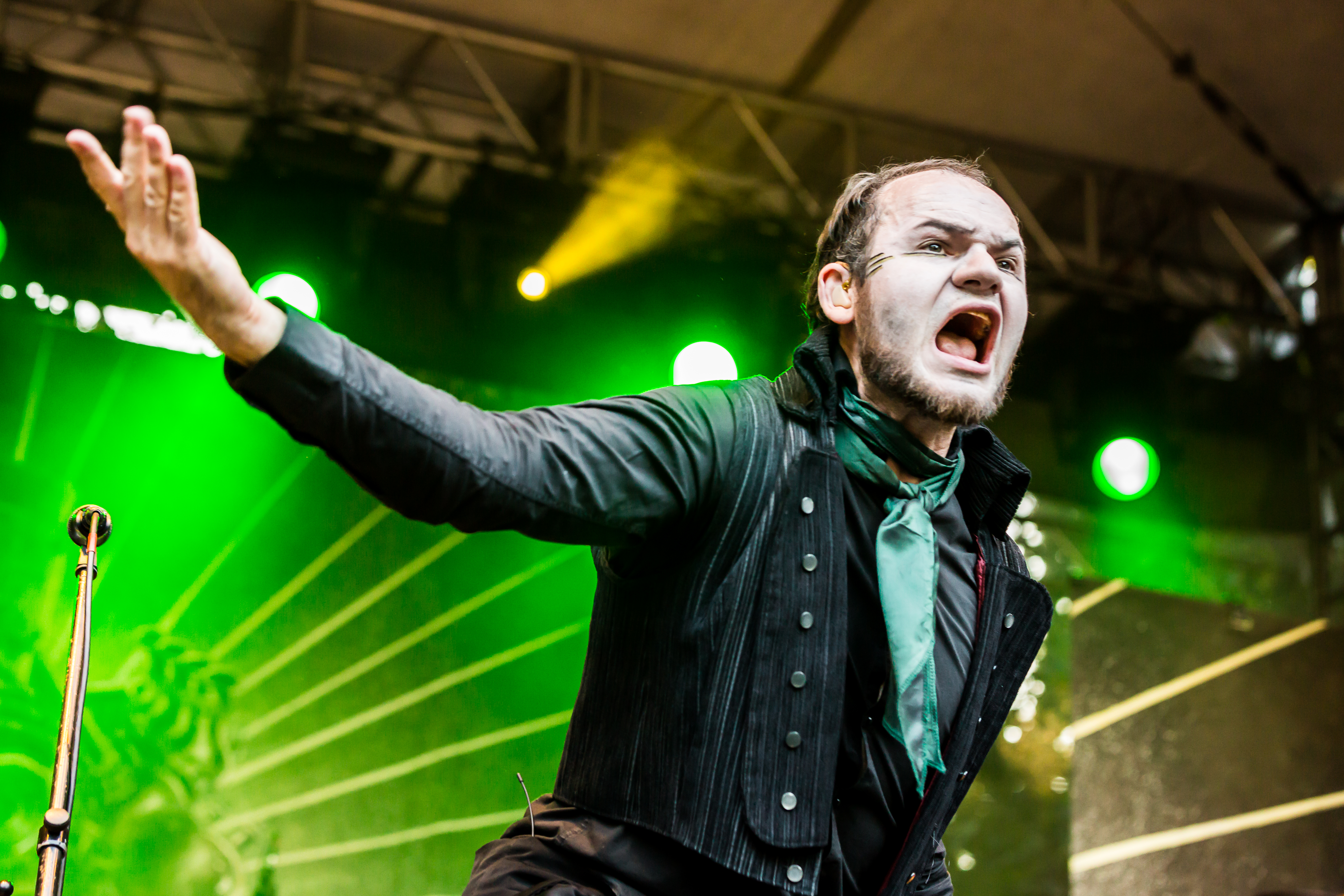
Comte Caspar

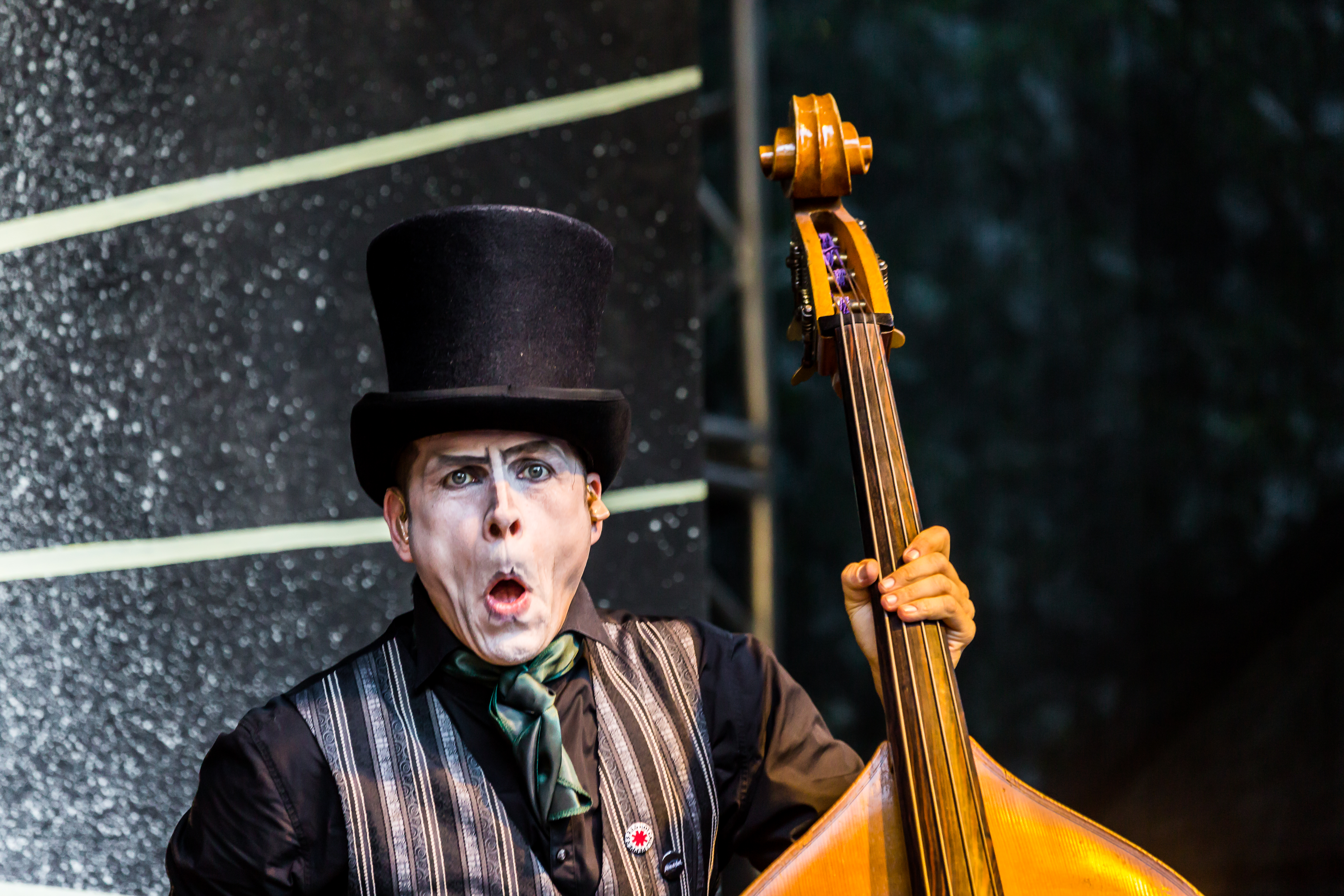
Sissy Voss

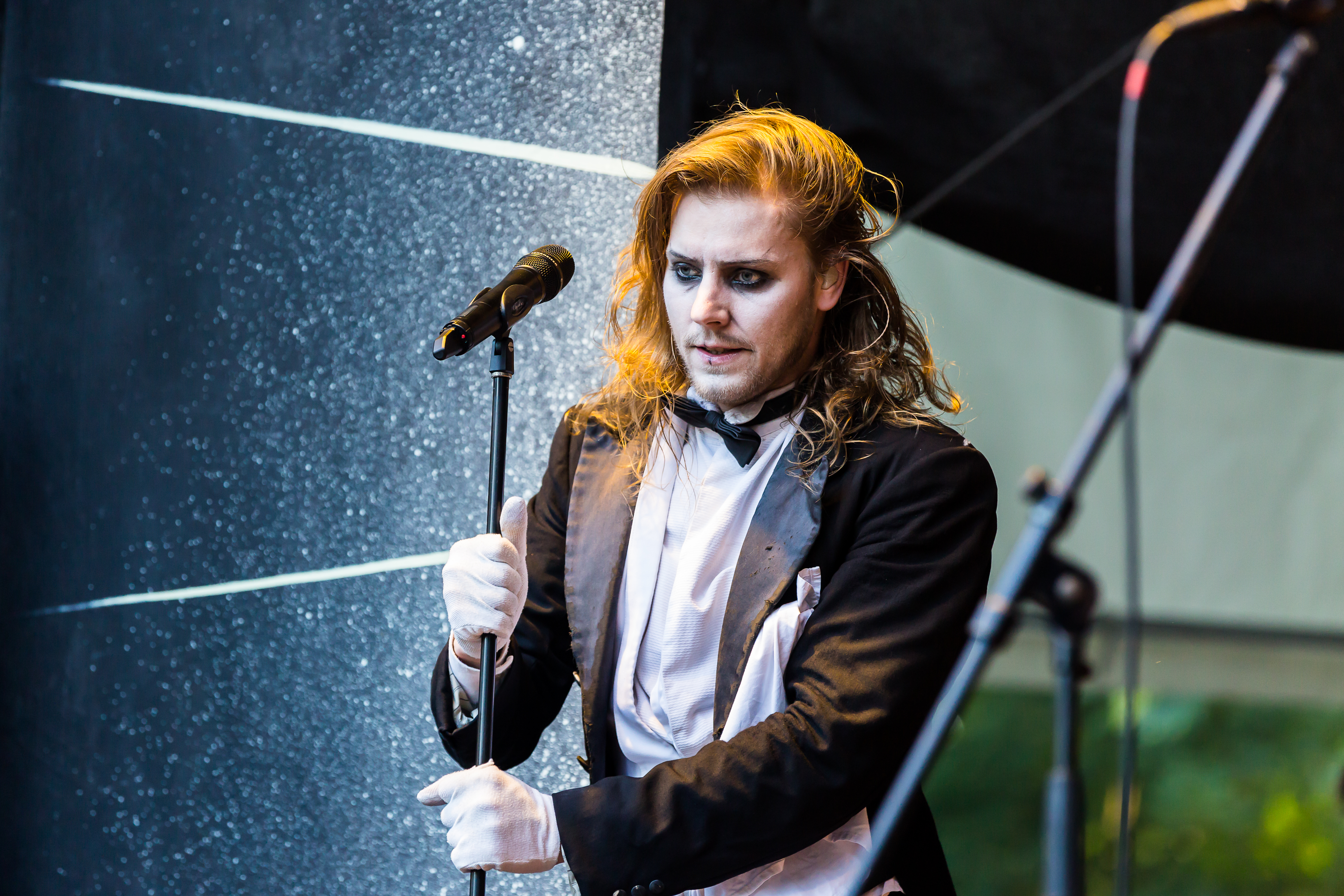
Bastille
