= Chris Harms =

Australian cricketer

Personal information
- Full name: Christopher Louis Harms
- Born: 21 April 1956 (age 70); Albury, New South Wales, Australia
- Batting: Left-handed
- Bowling: Right-arm off-spin

Domestic team information
- Years: Team
- 1982/83–1985/86: South Australia

Career statistics
Competition	First-class
Matches	14
Runs scored	453
Batting average	22.65
100s/50s	0/0
Top score	46*
Balls bowled	2,256
Wickets	23
Bowling average	45.39
5 wickets in innings	0
10 wickets in match	0
Best bowling	4/60
Catches/stumpings	13/–
- Source: Cricinfo, 24 August 2017

Christopher Louis Harms (born 21 April 1956) is an Australian former cricketer who played first-class cricket for South Australia from 1982–83 to 1985–86.

Harms was a lower-order batsman and off-spin bowler. His highest first-class score was 46 not out, when he helped South Australia avoid defeat against the English tourists in 1982–83. His best bowling figures came against Tasmania in 1985–86, when he played an important role in a 55-run victory: 43 not out and 5 not out, and 3 for 49 and 4 for 60.

He leads the not-for-profit All Australian Company, a sport-based manufacturing business employing predominantly indigenous people in Adelaide's north. He has served as a councillor on the Barossa Council in South Australia.
