= Mantus (band) =

German band

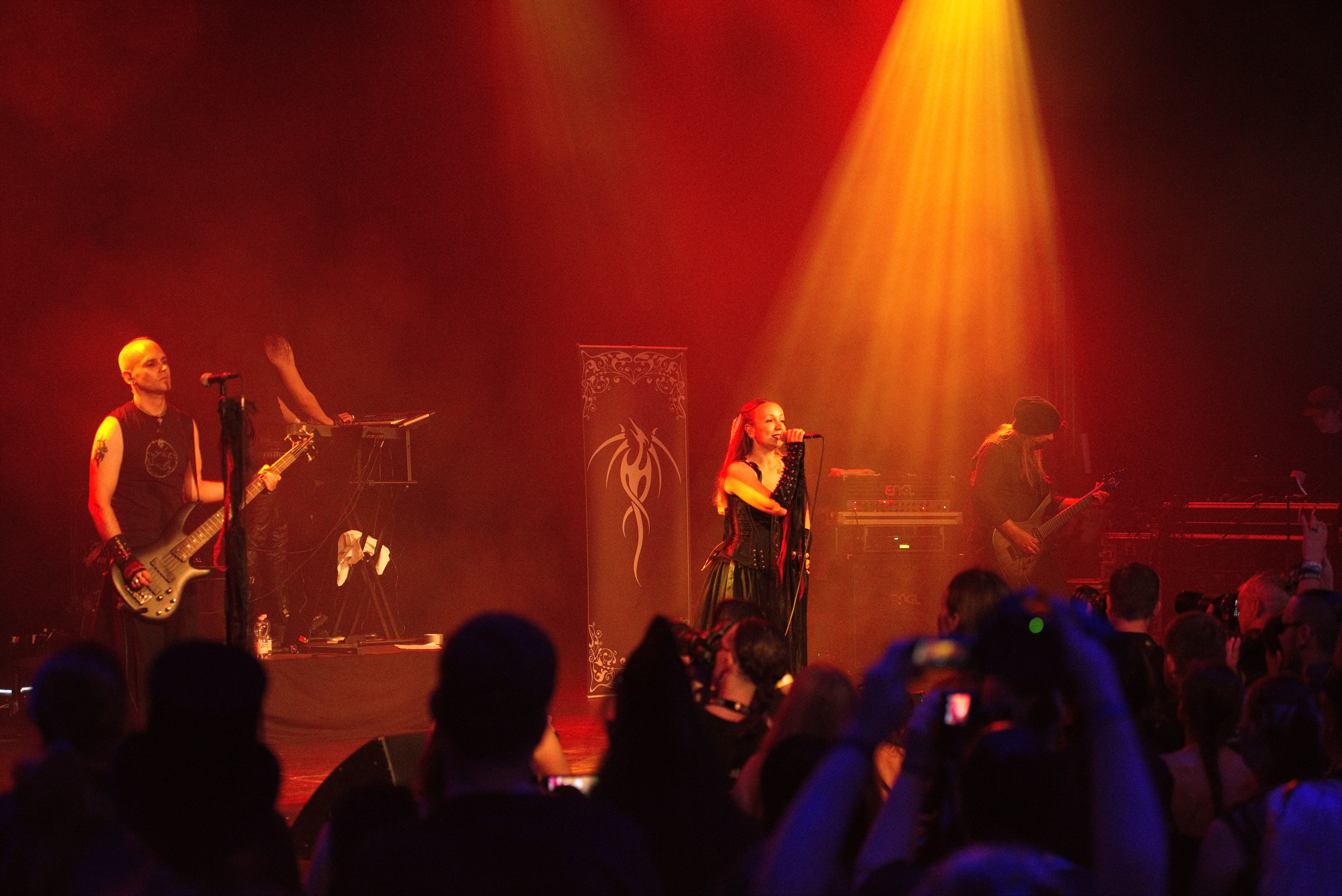
- Mantus performing in 2016

Background information
- Origin: Cologne, Germany
- Years active: 1997–2005; 2008–present
- Label: Trisol Music Group
- Members: Martin Schindler; Chiara Amberia
- Past members: Tina Schindler
- Website: mantus.de

Mantus is a German band from Cologne, formed in 1997 by Martin Schindler. It is a goth/metal duo and a music project from the Dark culture scene. The band's name derives from the eponymous god of the underworld of the Etruscans. The band was disbanded in 2005 but reunited in 2008. Mantus is signed to the German record label Trisol Music Group.

== Members ==
=== Current members ===
- Martin Schindler — music, lyrics, vocals (1997–present)
- Chiara Amberia — vocals (since 2012)

=== Former members ===
- Tina Schindler — vocals (until 2012)

== Discography ==
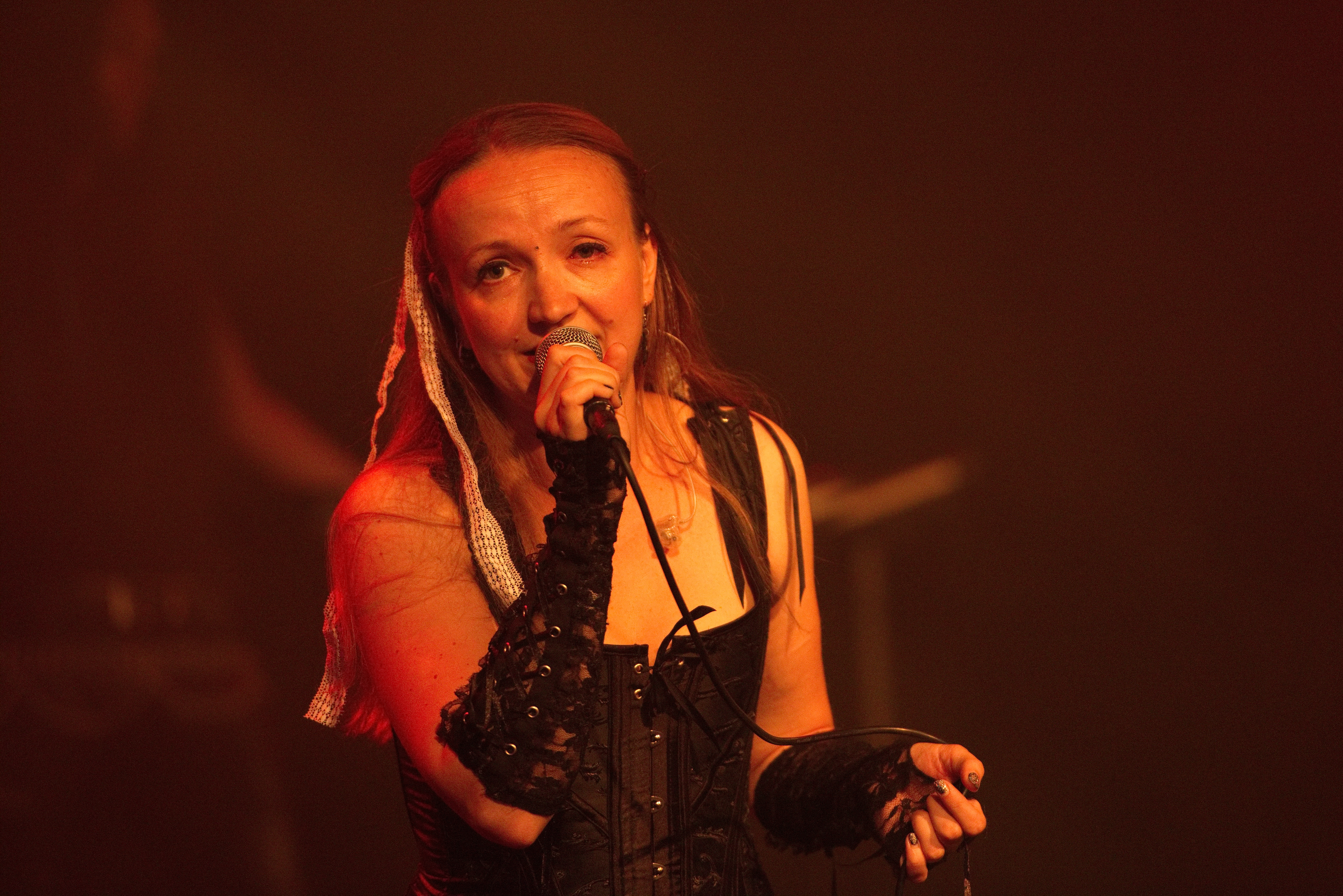
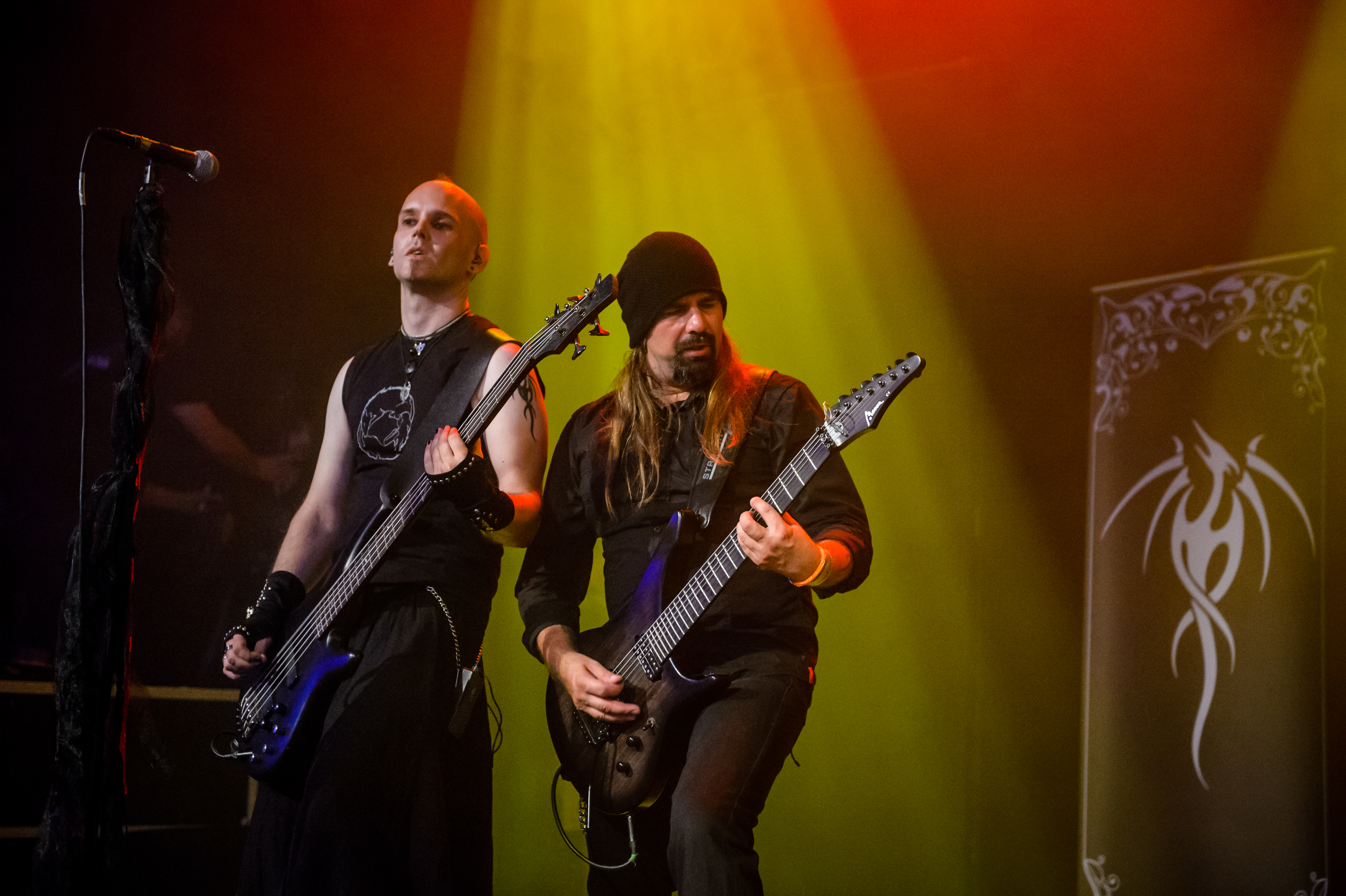
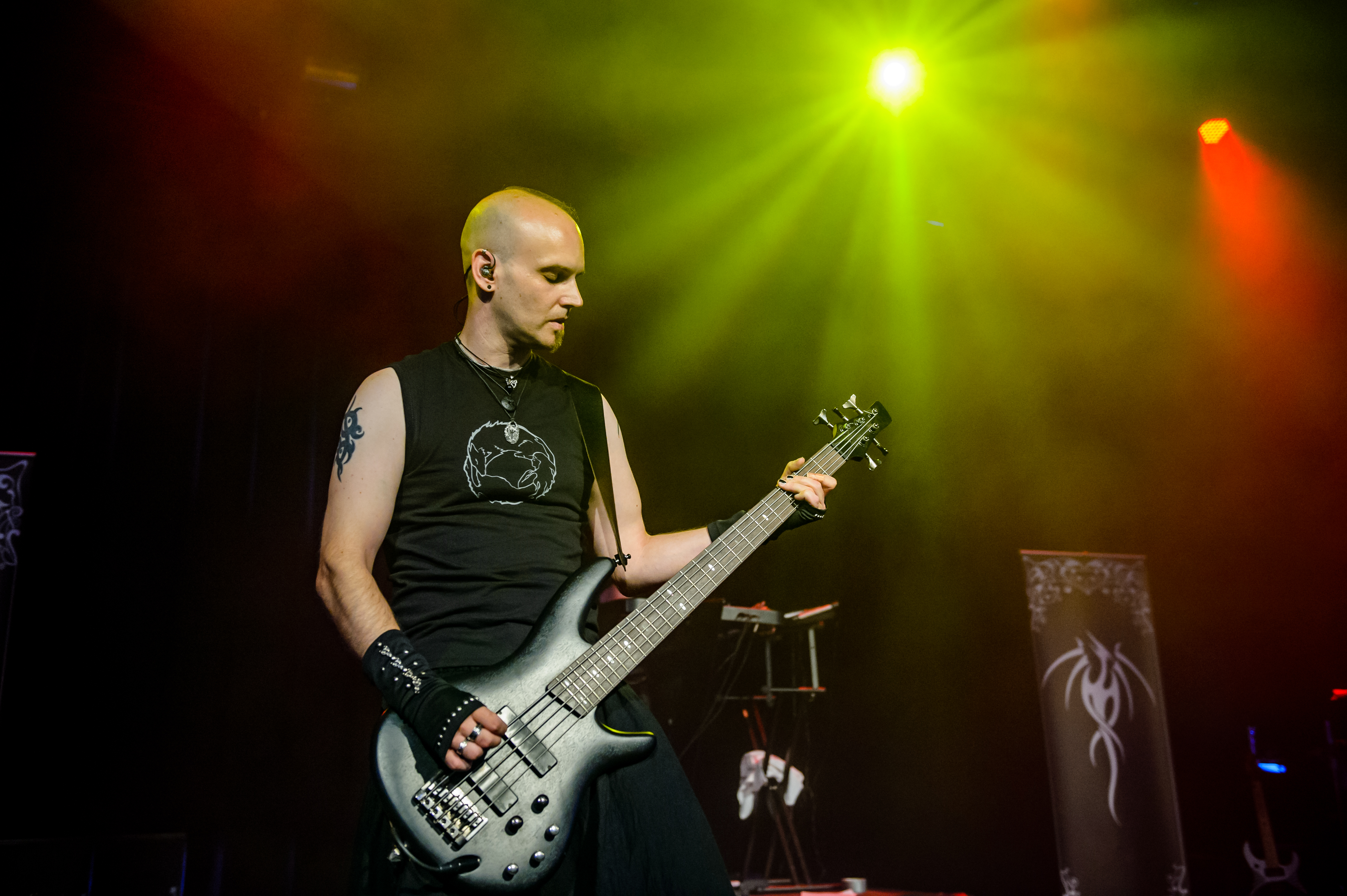
Mantus performing in 2016

=== Albums ===
- Liebe und Tod (2000)
- Abschied (2001)
- Fremde Welten (2002)
- Weg ins Paradies (2003)
- Ein Hauch von Wirklichkeit (2004)
- Zeit muss enden (2005)
- Chronik (Best of) (2006)
- Requiem (2009)
- Demut (2010)
- Die Hochzeit von Himmel und Hölle (2010)
- Zeichen (2011)
- Wölfe (2012)
- Fatum (Best Of) (2013)
- Portrait aus Wut und Trauer (2014)
- Melancholia (2015)
- Refugium (2016)
- Staub & Asche (2018)
- Katharsis (2019)
- Manifest (2021)
- Verstärker (2023)

=== EPs ===
- Keine Liebe (2004)
- Königreich der Angst (2009)
- Sünder (2011)
