= Principe Valiente =

Swedish musical group

- Years active: 2007–present
- Members: Fernando Honorato, Jimmy Ottosson, Rebecka Johansson and Joakim Janthe
- Website: principevaliente.com

Principe Valiente is a Swedish band based in Stockholm. Their sound may partly be the result of a variety of elements inspired by the minimalism of certain post-punk acts and the lushness of shoegazing, but their music has frequently been labelled "dark pop".

The band consists of Fernando Honorato (vocals, bass), Jimmy Ottosson (guitar), Rebecka Johansson (keyboards) and Joakim Janthe (drums). In 2007 they released an eponymous EP that got played on the radio and by DJs around Europe. It also received good reviews in North America.

The debut album Principe Valiente was released in February 2011 via Paris Music and distributed by Cosmos Music Group. The music video for the first single "The Night" has been rotating on German national television where it also topped the Pop10 video chart week 47 and 49 in 2010.

2013 was a busy year for Principe Valiente when they toured extensively throughout Europe and played at the WGT, the world's largest goth-music festival. On 21 May 2013, they opened for Peter Murphy, best known as vocalist in the legendary band Bauhaus, at Debaser Medis in Stockholm. In parallel, they recorded their second album.

Principe Valiente release their second album Choirs of Blessed Youth 6 June 2014. It was recorded in Stockholm in three different studios: Sound Trade, The Boiler Room and Killian Studios. The band collaborated with British producer Ed Buller, who mixed the singles "Take Me With You" and "She Never Returned".

== Discography ==
- EP (EP 2007)
- The Night (single 2010)
- Principe Valiente (album 2011)
- Choirs Of Blessed Youth (album 2014)
- Oceans (album 2017)
- Principe Valiente (Second Edition) (album reissue 2018)
- Barricades (album 2022)
- In This Light (album 2024)
