= Spetsnaz (band) =

Swedish EBM band

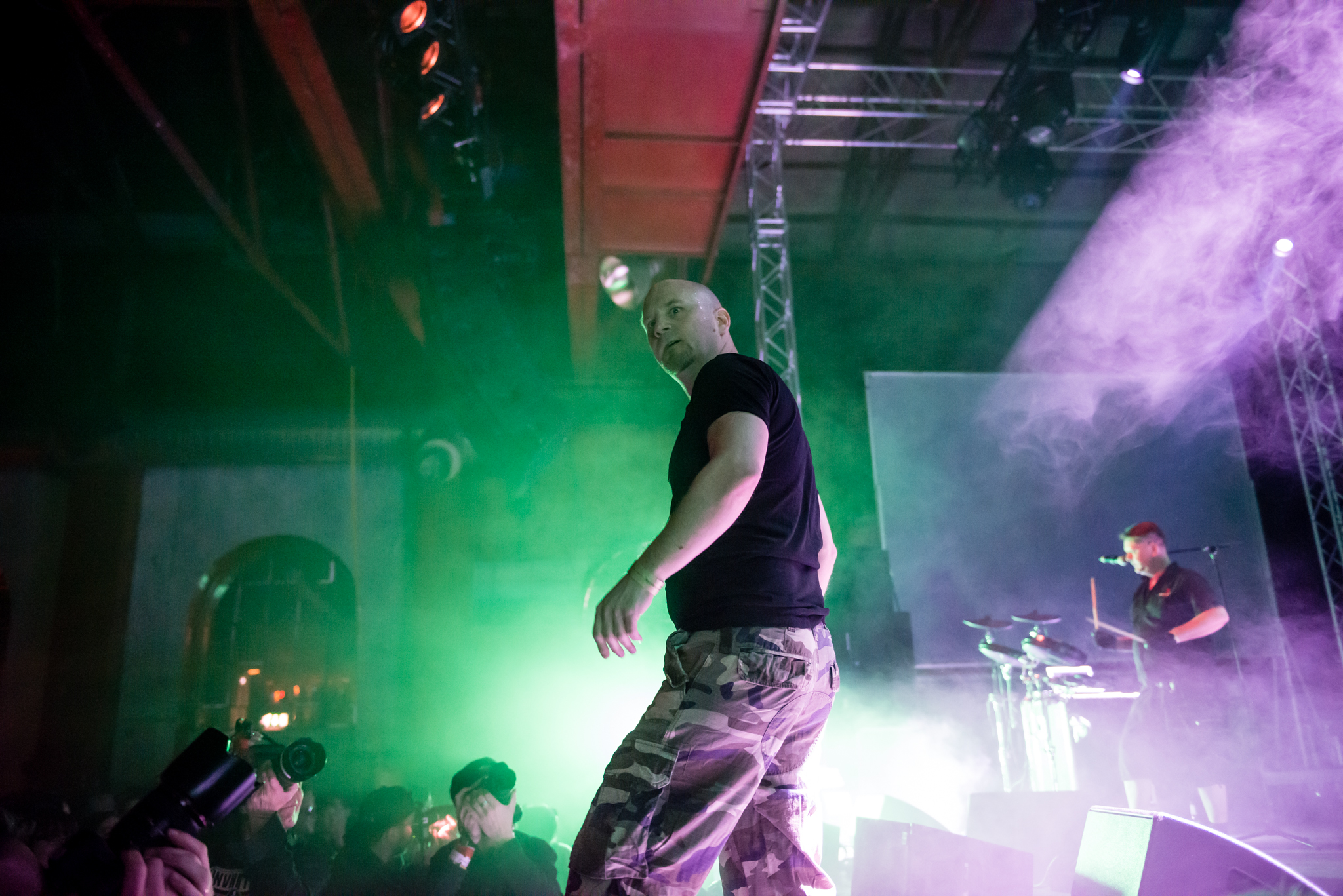
- Spetsnaz at E-Tropolis 2015

Background information
- Origin: Örebro, Sverige
- Genres: EBM
- Years active: 2001–present
- Labels: Out of Line; Scanner; SubSpace Communications
- Members: Stefan Nilsson; Pontus Stålberg

Spetsnaz (named for the Russian word for "Special Forces") is an EBM duo, formed in Örebro, Sweden by Stefan Nilsson and Pontus Stålberg in 2001.

Inspired by pioneering artists such as Nitzer Ebb, Front 242, Die Krupps and DAF, Spetsnaz was formed as a reaction against Futurepop and to revive what Nilsson and Stålberg saw as "old school" EBM music. The band name was taken from one of the street gangs in the 1979 film The Warriors.

== History ==
The band's 2004 single "Perfect Body" took the top spot on the German Alternative Charts (DAC) and ranked #18 on the DAC Top Singles of 2005. In 2006, the album Totalitär peaked at #3 on the DAC and ranked #26 on that year's DAC Top Albums chart.

In November 2006, the duo cancelled their then upcoming tour with And One. Side-Line and other members of the alternative music press reported that they had split, citing differences between the two members. However, only a day later, their record company Out of Line posted a news story denying the split. They have since "reunited" for a gig with DAF.Partei, and released "Deadpan" in November 2007.

In 2008, Pontus Stålberg formed the side project Turnbull A.C's with Lars Karlsson and released the album Let's Get Pissed!, which sounds very similar to Spetsnaz but with a more raw feel.

== Discography ==
=== Studio albums ===
- Grand Design (2003, re-released in 2004)
- Totalitär (2006)
- Deadpan (2007)
- For Generations To Come (2013)

=== EPs ===
- Choose Your Weapon EP (2003)
- Perfect Body (2004)
- Degenerate Ones (2005)
- Hardcore Hooligans (2006)
