= Rekids =

- Founded: 2006
- Founder: Matt Edwards; James Masters
- Genre: Electronic
- Country of origin: England
- Location: London, Berlin
- Official website: https://rekids.com

Rekids is a UK-based independent record label, conceived in 2006 by Matt Edwards (aka Radio Slave) and James Masters. The label releases mainly electronic dance music, incorporating elements of techno, house and disco. The label has a number of core artists, among which includes Nina Kraviz. Rekids has released a plethora of original work and remixes from various artists including Carl Craig, DJ Sneak, Kenny Larkin, Claude VonStroke, Josh Wink, Steve Lawler, Slam and Dubfire.

== The Label ==
The label releases on a variety of formats, including vinyl, CD and digital. All singles in the Rekids catalogue are released on vinyl as well as digitally. Albums and compilations are available on both CD and digital. Releases on Rekids sub-label REK'D are digital only, with the exception of the first release REK'D001 - Dustin Zahn - Stranger (To Stability) which was also released on vinyl. REKIDS006CD, The Machine's (aka Matt Edwards) debut album 'RedHead' was also released on vinyl and is part of a wider collaborative project incorporating audio and visuals by Misha Hollenbach, one half of art and design duo Perks and Mini (P.A.M.).

REKIDS010CD, Nina Kraviz's debut album was also released as a double-vinyl with gatefold sleeve as well as on CD.

The label also takes special care with the artwork for each release, working mostly with Brighton-based 'Red Design'. Over the years, the label has aimed to develop an identity through its artwork as well as the music it releases.

In 2011 Radio Slave collaborated with Japanese toy maker Devilrobots to create a Rekids-themed toy 'No Sleep No Tofu'. The toy is a Japanese Kubrick figure produced by MediCom - a small, limited edition collector's item with a block-style human form similar to Playmobil or Lego. The head of the figure is a detachable block which features the sleeve design for REKIDS036 - Radio Slave - No Sleep (Part Six). After the earthquake and tsunami that hit Japan in early 2011, Rekids decided to donate all proceeds of the sales of the toy to support Red Cross relief efforts in Japan.

2012 saw the launch of the 'Pyramids Of Mars' label - a multimedia project that involves the releases of books, films and other collector's items along with music. Matt's 2010 album 'RedHead' (under his 'Machine' pseudonym) was re-issued on Pyramids of Mars as part of a highly collectible deluxe package, including a re-interpretation of the full album by Joe Claussell. The boxset was limited to 50 copies, each hand-painted by Misha Hollenbach, and included triple-vinyl pressings of both Claussell's and Edwards' versions. The release was available exclusively at London's LN-CC store. The first official musical release on Pyramids Of Mars was a collection of Quiet Village remixes.

Rekids also hosts regular club nights around Europe, most notably at Berlin's Panorama Bar and the Rex Club in Paris.

== Discography ==
=== Albums ===
Artist	Title	Label Number	Release Date
Luke Solomon	The Difference Engine	REKIDS002CD	2008
Toby Tobias	Space Shuffle	REKIDS003CD	2008
James Teej	Evening Harvest	REKIDS005CD	2010
The Machine	RedHead	REKIDS006CD	2010
Mr. G	Still Here (Get On Down)	REKIDS007CD	2010
Luke Solomon	The Difference Engine (Redux)	REKIDS008CD	2010
Nina Kraviz	Nina Kraviz	REKIDS010CD	2012
Mr. G	State Of Flux	REKIDS011CD	2012

=== Compilations ===
- Various - ONE (REKIDS001CD, 2007)
- Various - Rekids Revolution (REKIDS004CD, 2009)
- Radio Slave - Works! Selected Remixes 2006 - 2010 (REKIDS009CD, 2011)

=== Singles ===
Artist	Title	Label Number	Release Date
Radio Slave	My Bleep	REKIDS001	2006
REKID	Next Stop Chicago	REKIDS002	2006
Toby Tobias	A Close Shave	REKIDS003	2006
Mr. G	E.C.G.'ed	REKIDS004	2006
Radio Slave	Secret Base	REKIDS005	2006
Spencer Parker	Beautiful Noise	REKIDS006	2006
Luke Solomon	Ghouls	REKIDS007	2006
Radio Slave	No Sleep (Part One)	REKIDS008	2006
Radio Slave	No Sleep (Part Two)	REKIDS009	2006
Matt O'Brien	Serotone	REKIDS010	2006
Toby Tobias	Dave's Sex Bits	REKIDS011	2007
Audiofly & Paul Harris	Miscalate	REKIDS012	2007
Mr. G	U Askin'?	REKIDS013	2007
Discemi	Data Sapiens	REKIDS014	2007
Kenny Hawkes & David Parr	Gemini	REKIDS015	2007
Radio Slave	Screaming Hands (Remixes)	REKIDS016	2007
Various	Rekids One Sampler	REKIDS017	2007
Radio Slave	Bell Clap Dance	REKIDS018	2007
Jjak Hogan	Jjak Hogan EP	REKIDS019	2008
Luke Solomon	The Darkest Secret	REKIDS020	2008
Toby Tobias	Nervoso EP	REKIDS021	2008
Radio Slave	No Sleep (Part Four)	REKIDS022	2008
Veinte Tres	Serpiente Cosmica	REKIDS023	2008
Radio Slave	No Sleep (Part Five)	REKIDS024	2008
Luke Solomon	Robots	REKIDS025	2008
Toby Tobias	The Feeling	REKIDS026	2008
Radio Slave	Grindhouse (Remixes)	REKIDS027	2008
Radio Slave	Bell Clap Dance (Remixes)	REKIDS028	2008
Runaway	Brooklyn Club Jam	REKIDS029	2008
Spencer Parker	The Dreamer EP	REKIDS030	2008
Radio Slave	Tantakatan (The Drunken Shed Mix)	REKIDS031	2008
Jjak Hogan	Professor Feet	REKIDS032	2009
Mr. G	Makes No Sense	REKIDS033	2009

Artist	Title	Label Number	Release Date
Santé & Steffen Herb	Supervision	REKIDS034	2009
Various	Revolution Sampler	REKIDS035	2009
Radio Slave	No Sleep (Part Six)	REKIDS036	2009
Deepgroove & Jamie Anderson	The Clock	REKIDS037	2009
Worst Case Scenario	Hot Beef	REKIDS038	2009
Toby Tobias	Space Shuffle (Remixes)	REKIDS039	2009
Spencer Parker	My Heart	REKIDS040	2009
Baeka	Right At It	REKIDS041	2009
Radio Slave	No Sleep (Part Six)(Remixes)	REKIDS042	2009
Alexkid	Celi Dub EP	REKIDS043	2009
Chris Liebing / Speedy J	Discombobulated / Klave	REKIDS044	2009
Nina Kraviz	Pain In the Ass	REKIDS045	2009
Nikola Gala	The Pump EP	REKIDS046	2010
Radio Slave	I Don't Need A Cure For This	REKIDS047	2010
Toby Tobias	You Know EP	REKIDS048	2010
James Teej	Seven Day Mend	REKIDS049	2010
Radio Slave	I Don't Need A Cure For This (Remixes)	REKIDS050	2010
Matt Tolfrey & Chris Sylvester	Almost There	REKIDS051	2010
Nina Kraviz	I'm Week	REKIDS052	2010
Radio Slave	East West	REKIDS053	2010
Nikola Gala	The Beginning EP	REKIDS054	2011
Spencer Parker	I Think I Love You	REKIDS055	2011
Ronny & Renzo	Heartbreak Theme	REKIDS056	2011
Butch	Butch's Raw Beats Vol. 1	REKIDS057	2011
Lee Van Dowski	On	REKIDS058	2011
Nina Kraviz	Ghetto Kraviz	REKIDS059	2012
Liviu Groza & Kennedy Smith	Could Be Anybody	REKIDS060	2012
Spencer Parker	Versions Française	REKIDS061	2012
Nikola Gala	Only	REKIDS062	2012
The Rhythm Odyssey	Celestial Vibrations EP	REKIDS063	2012
Nina Kraviz	Aus feat. King Aus On The Mic	REKIDS064	2012
Nathan Barato feat. The Ride Committee & Roxy	Back Up Queen	REKIDS065	2012
DAP	Brush Your Lips	REKIDS066	2012
Radio Slave	Live Edits	REKIDS067	2012
Nina Kraviz	Steve Rachmad / Kink Remixes	REKIDS068	2012

=== Rek'd ===
Singles
Artist	Title	Label Number	Release Date
Dustin Zahn	Stranger (To Stability)	REKD001	2009
Paul Harris & Alex Tepper	Terris	REKD002	2009
The Echologist	Hustle EP	REKD003	2009
Richard Seeley	Mas Profundo	REKD004	2009
Aberrant	Kirkbride's Dungeon	REKD005	2010
Paul Harris & Alex Tepper	Terris (Remixes)	REKD006	2010
Radio Slave	Roof Top	REKD007	2010
Radio Slave	K-Maze (The Ornaments Remixes)	REKD008	2011
Nina Kraviz	Ghetto Kraviz Edits	REKD009	2012
Radio Slave	Loose Joint	REKD010	2012

=== Pyramids of mars ===
Compilations
Artist	Title	Label Number	Release Date
Quiet Village	Too High To Move: The Quiet Village Remixes	POMCD001	2012

Singles
Artist	Title	Label Number	Release Date
Mudd / François K	Too High To Move: The Quiet Village Remix Sampler	POM001	2012

== Artists ==
- Radio Slave
- REKID
- Toby Tobias
- Mr. G
- Spencer Parker
- Luke Solomon
- Matt O'Brien
- Audiofly
- Paul Harris
- Discemi
- Kenny Hawkes
- David Parr
- Jjak Hogan
- Veinte Tres
- Danton Eeprom
- Runaway
- Santé
- Steffen Herb
- Deepgroove
- Jamie Anderson
- Worst Case Scenario
- Baeka
- Alexkid
- Chris Liebing
- Speedy J
- Nina Kraviz
- Nikola Gala
- James Teej
- Matt Tolfrey
- Christopher Sylvester
- Dustin Zahn
- Alex Tepper
- The Echologist
- Richard Seeley
- Aberrant
- The Machine
- Ronny & Renzo
- Butch
- Lee Van Dowski
- Liviu Groza
- Kennedy Smith
- The Rhythm Odyssey
- Nathan Barato
- DAP

== Additional Remixers ==
- Roman Flugel
- Jesse Rose
- Prins Thomas
- Rob Mello
- Ripperton
- Claude VonStroke
- Quiet Village
- Partial Arts
- Marcel Dettmann
- Josh Wink
- Cosmo Vitelli
- Tiger Timing
- Brontosaurus
- Sebo K
- Andomat 3000
- I:Cube
- John Daly
- Dubfire
- Terrence Fixmer
- Slam
- Simon Baker
- Hippie Torales
- L.S.B
- Ajello
- Shed
- Adam Marshall
- Tedd Patterson
- Boola
- Christian Vogel
- Ben Klock
- Allez Allez
- Dave Ellesmere
- Tensnake
- Daniel Sanchez
- Michel Cleis
- Kaytronik
- Steve Lawler
- AFFKT
- Danny Fido
- Kenny Larkin
- DJ Sneak
- Melon
- Mendo
- Lewis Boardman
- Len Faki
- Reboot
- youANDme
- Rhauder
- Carl Craig
- Amine Edge
- Amir Alexander
- Molly
- D'Julz
- Ryan Elliott
- Matthew E
- DJ Qu
- Oliver $
- 808 Fake
- Steve Rachmad
- KiNK
