= Stefan Goldmann =

German-Bulgarian DJ and composer (born 1978)

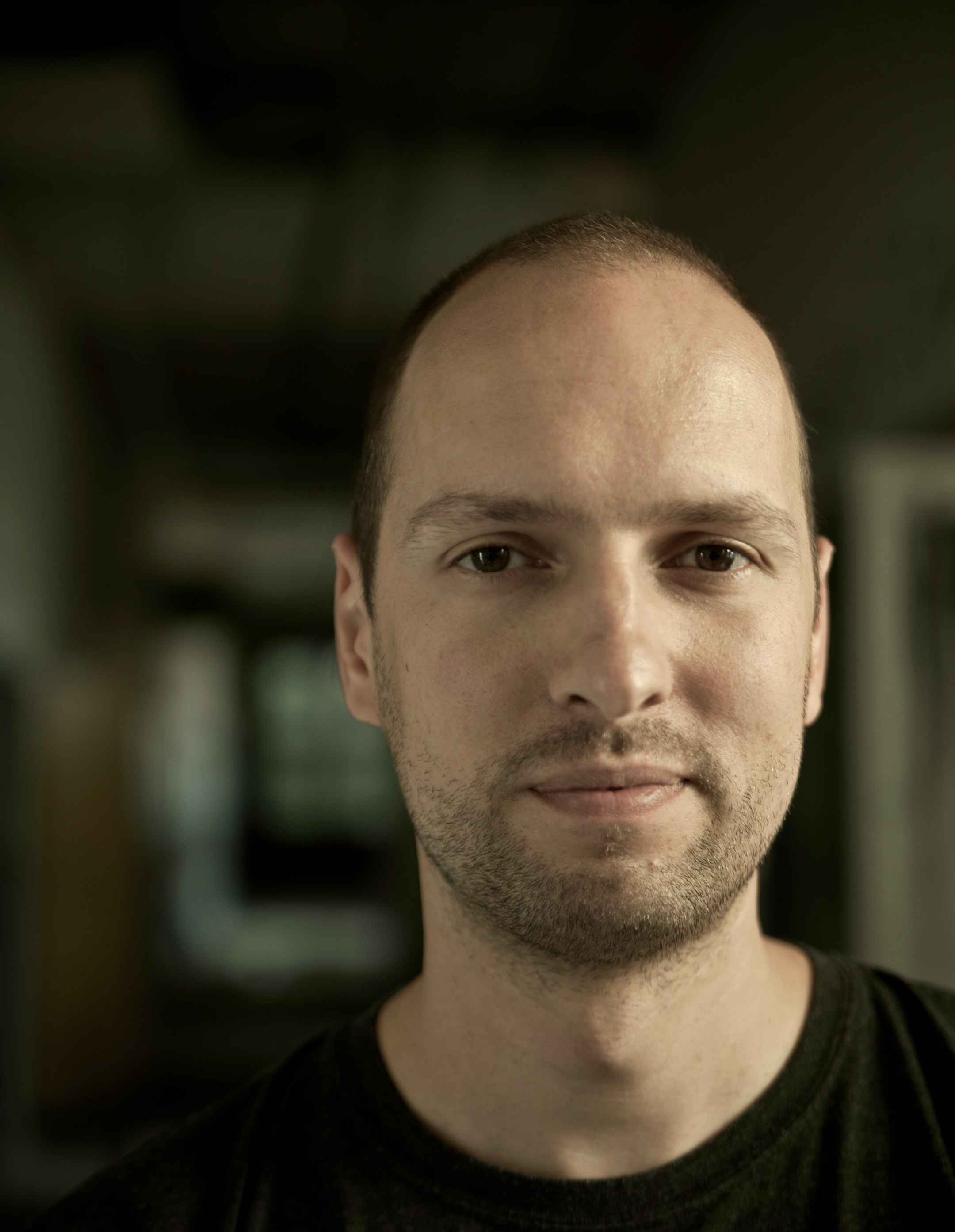
- Goldmann in 2017

Background information
- Also known as: Simitli, Barricade
- Born: Stefan Goldmann; 1978 (age 47–48)
- Origin: Berlin, Germany / Sofia, Bulgaria
- Genres: Minimal house, techno, avant-garde
- Occupations: Composer, DJ, record producer
- Years active: 2001–Present
- Labels: Macro, Perlon, Cocoon, Innervisions, Ovum, Classic Recordings
- Website: stefangoldmann.com

Stefan Goldmann (born 1978) is a German-Bulgarian DJ and composer of electronic music. His work has been described as intelligent minimal techno.

== Career ==
Since 2001 Goldmann's music has been released through labels such as Perlon, Innervisions and others. Since 2006 Goldmann has also been closely associated with Berlin's Berghain / Panorama Bar club, for which he wrote a column, is a co-author of its book and conceived the Elektroakustischer Salon event series.

In 2010 he collaborated with choreographer Kevin O'day on a ballet commissioned by Nationaltheater Mannheim. Since then he has realized several commissioned and site-specific works outside the club circuit, including performances at Honen-in Temple in Kyoto, Japan (also released as a recording), the Los Angeles County Museum of Art and Zollverein in Essen. In 2016 he premiered the large format music theater work Alif at Berlin's MaerzMusik festival and wrote the soundtrack to Swiss experimental documentary film A1 in the same year. In 2020 he was invited to curate the Philharmonie Berlin's first electronic music program, Strom Festival, where he also performed in the Grand Hall.

Goldmann has written essays on digitization and the aesthetics of electronic music and has written a book on sound presets. He has held lectures and workshops on invitation of DAAD, the Berlin University of the Arts and other institutions. As an artist in residence he has been a fellow of Villa Kamogawa in Kyoto (2012), Villa Aurora in Los Angeles (2017), the German Academy in Rome – Casa Baldi (2022) and the Tarabya Cultural Academy of Istanbul (2023).

== Macro Recordings ==
Based in Berlin, Germany, Macro was founded by Goldmann and Finn Johannsen in 2007. Its releases range from techno tracks to symphonic recordings and include multiple live bands such as Elektro Guzzi and KUF in addition to releases by artists such as KiNK, Maria Chavez, Peter Kruder, Pete Namlook, Raudive, Santiago Salazar and remixes by Pépé Bradock, Ricardo Villalobos and The Knife's Oni Ayhun. The label has also released archival recordings such as the previously unreleased Patrick Cowley album Catholic. Several of its releases have been nominated for the Preis der Deutschen Schallplattenkritik, including works by Stefan Goldmann and Maria Chavez, and have entered annual polls of media such as Resident Advisor, De:Bug and Groove Magazin.

== Personal life ==
Goldmann is the son of German composer and conductor Friedrich Goldmann.

== Discography (selected) ==
=== Albums ===
- The Transitory State (Macro 2008, double CD)
- Voices Of The Dead (Macro 2008, 5x7" box set)
- Igor Stravinsky: Le Sacre Du Printemps Edit (Macro 2009, CD)
- Haven't I Seen You Before (Tapeworm 2010, Cassette)
- 17:50 (Macro 2012, 2x12" and CD)
- Live At Honen-In Temple (Macro 2013, CD)
- Industry (Macro 2014, LP and CD)
- A1 (Macro 2016, CD)
- Tacit Script (Macro 2019, CD)
- Veiki (Macro 2019, CD)
- Live at Philharmonie Berlin (Macro 2020, CD)
- Vector Rituals (Macro 2022, LP)
- Call and Response (Ash International 2022, CD)
- Expanse (Edition Kymata 2024, 5xCD)
- Alluvium (Macro 2024, CD)
- Live at Borusan Müzik Evi Istanbul (Macro 2025, CD)
- Input (The Sofia Versions) (Macro 2025, CD)
- Automation Studies Vol.1 (Macro 2026, 3xCD)

=== Mix CDs ===
- The Empty Foxhole (Mule Electronic 2009, mix CD)
- Macrospective (Macro 2011, mix CD)
- Acustica (Macro 2023, mix CD)

=== DVDs ===
- Parameter (Macro 2012, DVD)

=== Singles & EPs ===
- The Shnic Shnac EP (Classic 2002, 12")
- Macroply/Submerge (Classic 2003, 12")
- Pain (Classic 2004, 12")
- Shimmer EP (Ovum 2004, 12")
- Blood (Perlon 2005, 12")
- Sleepy Hollow (Innervisions 2006, 12")
- Aurora / Beluga (Macro 2007, 12")
- Lunatic Fringe (Macro 2007, 12")
- Radiant Grace (Macro 2008, 12")
- Art Of Sorrow (Victoriaville 2009, 12")
- Yes To All / Under The Beam (Cocoon 2009, 12")
- The Maze (Macro 2010, 12")
- Remasters Vol.1 (Victoriaville 2010, 12")
- The Grand Hemiola (Macro 2011, 2x12")
- Emptying The Vaults 1 – 3 (Victoriaville 2011, 3x12")
- Adem EP, (Macro 2012, 12")
- Ghost Hemiola (Macro 2013, 2x12")
- Signs Taken For Wonders (Macro 2014, 12")
- Anchors EP (Macro 2015, 12")
- A1 Tools (Macro 2016, 12")
- An Ardent Heart (Macro 2018, 12")
- Tears Of Joy (Macro 2020, 12")
- Singing Wire (Macro 2022, 3x7")
- In Aggregate / Carob (Macro 2023, 10")
- Scale and Scope (Edition Kymata 2024, 4x flexidisc)
- Cache (Edition Kymata 2026, Card CD-ROM)
- Atelier (Macro 2026, 10")
- Winter is Coming (Edition Kymata 2026, 2xCD-ROM)

=== Remixes ===
Remixes include works for Christian Fennesz, Igor Stravinsky, John McLaughlin, Santiago Salazar, Kenny Hawkes, Freaks, DENA, Pantha du Prince, Pierre Boulez, Sergey Rodionov and others.
