= Daimonion (disambiguation) =

Daimonion is a Socratic philosophical concept.

Daimonion may also refer to:

- Daimonion (band), a Polish rock band
  - Daimonion (Daimonion album), 2007
- Daimonion (Project Pitchfork album), 2001
