= Sun God (disambiguation) =

Sun God or Sun Goddess may refer to

- a solar deity
  - see List of solar deities
- Sun God (statue), monumental figure at the University of California, San Diego
- Sun God Festival, music festival at the University of California, San Diego
- Sun God (band), European electronic music group active 1994–2020
- Sun God (album), 1995 debut release by the band Sun God
- Sun God, nickname for American football player Amon-Ra St. Brown
- Sun God (rapper), son of Ghostface Killah of Wu-Tang Clan
- "Sun God" (song), track on the 2020 album Pegasus by Trippie Redd
- Sun Goddess (album), 1974 jazz release by Ramsey Lewis
- "Sun Goddess" (song), title track of the Ramsey Lewis album
- Sun Goddess (horse), an Irish-bred champion racehoese

== See also ==
- What If God Were the Sun?, 2007 television film based on the 2000 novel of the same name by John Edward
