= Black Noise =

Black Noise may refer to:

- Black noise, a type of noise consisting of mostly silence
- Black Noi$e, a record producer from Detroit, Michigan
- Black Noise (group), a hip-hop crew from Cape Town, South Africa
- Black Noise (FM album)
- Black Noise (Pantha du Prince album)
- Black Noise (book), by Tricia Rose
