= Jerry Gelb =

American actor

Jerry Gelb is an American actor and voice actor.

Gelb moved to Los Angeles in late 1979. He is a graduate of the Florida State University School of Theatre ('76). His work has ranged from improvisation at the Comedy Store to L.A. Theater, TV and film to directing modern theater through Shakespeare. Owner and director of Ear Whacks!, a voice services and ADR company, he has voice cast approximately 40 feature films, including Dark City and Lost in Space, and voiced over 60 feature films. Jerry has also voiced a variety of anime series, such as Witch Hunter Robin and Magic Knight Rayearth. He has served on the National Board of the Screen Actors Guild and committees.

== Filmography ==
=== Anime roles ===
- .hack//Legend of the Twilight as Katsuyuki
- Digimon Frontier as Toucanmon
- Magic Knight Rayearth as Eagle Vision
- Witch Hunter Robin as Master Yuji Kobari
- Gestalt as Soushi
- Fist of the North Star as Junk (credited as Donovan Ross)
- Vampire Princess Miyu as Bird, Unnamed Shinma
- Mobile Suit Gundam: The 08th MS Team as Masado (credited as Donovan Ross)
- The Wanderers as Guest Voice
- Bit the Cupid as Various Voices

=== Movies ===
- Cowboy Bebop: The Movie as Shadkins
- Jataka tales as Various Voices
- Bottoms Up as Premiere Paparazzi
- Chasing Ghosts as Jerry
- Latin Dragon as Earl Billings
- Wild Things 2 as Morgue Attendant
- A Night at Sophie's as Al 'Fat Al'
- Winning London as Bell Captain
- All You Need as Nelson
- The Granstream Saga as Additional Voice
- The Stranger as Additional Voice

=== Television ===
- Entourage as Additional Voices
- Book of Days as Priest
- Strong Medicine - "Black N' Flu" as Ken King
- Strong Medicine - "Complications" as Ken King
- The Huntress - "Showdown" as Nick Babbo
- Roswell - "Max In The City" as The Emissary
- Unhappily Ever After as The Principal
- Max Monroe: Loose Cannon - "Legacy" as Petrell Brother
- Paradise - "Boomtown" as Henchman #1

=== ADR voice casting ===
- The Muppets' Wizard of Oz
- It's a Very Merry Muppet Christmas Movie
- All You Need
- Termination Man
- The Last Siege
- Devil's Arithmetic
- Lured Innocence
- Southern Cross
- Black Thunder
- Six String Samurai - ADR Supervisor
- Clockmaker
- Freedom Strike
- The Shrunken City
- Possums
- Lost in Space
- Dark City
- The Secret Kingdom
- Left Luggage
- Memorial Day
- The White Raven
- Spacejacked
- The Shooter
- Don't Sleep Alone
- Do You Wanna Dance?
- Scorpio One
- Shadow Dancer
- Surface to Air
