= The Triad (album) =

2016 album by Pantha du Prince

Studio album by Pantha du Prince
- Released: May 20, 2016

Pantha du Prince chronology
Black Noise (2010)	The Triad (2016)	Conference of Trees (2020)

The Triad is a 2016 album by German musician Pantha du Prince.

== Production ==
In May 2014, Pantha du Prince began a three-month residency at the Villa Aurora artists' retreat in Los Angeles alongside guitarist Scott Mou and drummer Bendik Hovik Kjeldsberg—together known as "The Triad".

The Triad followed Black Noise (2010) as Pantha du Prince's first solo album in six years, released on May 20, 2016. Its first single, "The Winter Hymn", had been released alongside a music video on February 19 of that year. Whereas Black Noise was composed in isolation, The Triad involved more in-person jamming.

== Reception ==
Professional ratings
Aggregate scores
Source	Rating
Metacritic	73/100
Review scores
Source	Rating
Pitchfork	8.0/10

According to the review aggregator Metacritic, The Triad received "generally favorable reviews" based on a weighted average score of 73 out of 100 from 19 critic scores.
