= Matt Edwards (DJ) =

English electronic music producer and DJ (born 1975)

- Born: Matthew Edwards; 4 June 1975 (age 50); London, England
- Origin: Brighton, England
- Genres: Techno, house, electronic
- Years active: 1992-present
- Labels: Rekids, Pyramids of Mars
- Website: rekids.com

Matthew (Matt) Edwards (born 4 June 1975) is an English electronic music producer and DJ based in Berlin, Germany. He is best known for his work in house and techno that he produces under his Radio Slave moniker. He has also released under a variety of different aliases including Cabin Fever, Canvas, DJ Maxxi, The Machine, REKID, Seadevils and Quiet Village. He is also co-founder of London-based record label Rekids, which he formed in 2006 with James Masters. Rekids is also mother label to the REK'D and Pyramids of Mars imprints.

== Career ==
Edwards' career began as a DJ in London and Aberystwyth, where he picked up a residency at the Milk Bar in 1992 and Aberystwyth football club. He would then go on to become resident at the legendary Ministry of Sound.

Radio Slave began in 2000 as a duo remixing project with Serge Santiago. As a pair Matt and Serge produced bootleg club remixes of songs by Busta Rhymes, Kylie Minogue, Limp Bizkit, Nancy Sinatra and many more pop artists. Around 2002, Serge left to pursue his own musical path leaving Edwards in control of the Radio Slave guise. He continued to produce a string of remixes for well-established artists, before finally releasing his own original material in 2006. From this point onwards, Edwards continued to release his own music, mostly through his own label Rekids, as well as remixing more underground electronic artists. In recent years, he has also released a number of different mix CDs including Fabric 48 and Strictly Rhythm Vol. 5.

As Radio Slave, Edwards is yet to release a full-length LP. However he has released albums of original material as The Machine, REKID and Quiet Village (with Joel Martin). The Machine is a multi-media venture combining music and visuals. The aural aspect features 6 tracks of experimental soundscapes – using found sounds and taking influence from contemporary electro-acoustic composition. The visual aspect comprises a short film by UK artists Lovely Jon & Mike Keelin, and each track has a corresponding image designed by Australian pop artist Misha Hollenbach. The music is available on CD and vinyl as The Machine's LP 'RedHead' and was released in 2010. The second track Opening Ceremony (Fuse) also appeared on Berlin imprint Innervisions in 2009 remixed by Ame and Dixon. As Quiet Village, Edwards released full-length LP 'Silent Movie' on Studio !K7 in 2008. The album was released on both vinyl and CD and focusses on more downtempo, left field music with balearic influences. As REKID, Matt released 14-track album 'Made in Menorca' in 2006 on Soul Jazz Records. The album was released on vinyl as well as CD and takes influence from disco music and deep house.

In 2011 he collaborated with Japanese toy maker Devilrobots to create a Rekids-themed toy 'No Sleep No Tofu'.

In May 2012, Edwards released a sample pack with label Sample Magic. The pack features 500MB of percussive and musical loops, hits and effects, designed to be used as tools for electronic music producers. 2012 also saw the launch the 'Pyramids of Mars' label – a multimedia project that incorporates various strands of artistic disciplines. The 2010 album RedHead (under his 'Machine' pseudonym) was re-issued on Pyramids of Mars as part of a deluxe package, including a re-interpretation of the full album by Joe Claussell. The boxset was limited to 50 copies, each hand-painted by Misha Hollenbach, and included triple-vinyl pressings of both Claussell's and Edwards' versions. The release was available exclusively at London's LN-CC store.

== Selected discography ==
=== Albums ===
- REKID: Made In Menorca, 2006
- Quiet Village: Silent Movie, 2008
- The Machine: RedHead, 2010
- Radio Slave: "Works! Selected Remixes 2006 -2010", 2011

=== Singles ===
- Radio Slave: Untitled, 2004
- Radio Slave: Slow, 2004
- Radio Slave: I'm Really Hot, 2004
- Radio Slave: Red Light, Green Light, 2004
- Radio Slave: Presents High Concept, 2004
- Radio Slave: My Bleep, 2006
- Radio Slave: No Sleep (Part One), 2006
- Radio Slave: No Sleep (Part Two), 2006
- Radio Slave: Secret Base, 2006
- Radio Slave: Bell Clap Dance, 2007
- Radio Slave: Screaming Hands (Remixes), 2007
- Radio Slave: No Sleep (Part Three), 2007
- Radio Slave: No Sleep (Part Four), 2008
- Radio Slave: No Sleep (Part Five), 2008
- Radio Slave: Sex Trax EP, 2008
- Radio Slave feat. Danton Eeprom: Grindhouse (Remixes), 2008
- Radio Slave: Bell Clap Dance (Remixes), 2008
- Radio Slave: Tantakatan (The Drunken Shed Mix), 2008
- Radio Slave: Eyes Wide Open / Incognito, 2008
- Radio Slave / Tony Lionni: Berghain 03 / Part 1, 2009
- Radio Slave: No Sleep (Part Six), 2009
- Radio Slave: No Sleep (Part Six Remixes), 2009
- Radio Slave: I Don't Need A Cure For This, 2010
- Radio Slave: I Don't Need A Cure For This (Remixes), 2010
- Radio Slave: East West EP, 2010
- Radio Slave: "Absolute Absolute", 2011
- Radio Slave: "Live Edits", 2012

=== Selected remixes ===
- Peace Division Feat. Pleasant Gehman: Blacklight Sleaze, 2006
- Matt O'Brien: Serotone, 2006
- Armand Van Helden: This Ain't Hollywood, 2007
- Len Faki: My Black Sheep, 2007
- UNKLE: Burn My Shadow, 2007
- Trentemøller: Moan, 2007
- Tiefschwarz: Blow, 2007
- Slam: Azure, 2007
- Discemi: Data Sapiens, 2007
- X-Press 2: Call That Love, 2008
- Mlle Caro & Franck Garcia: Dead Souls, 2008
- Booka Shade: Sweet Lies, 2008
- Florian Meindl: 8 Bit Romance, 2008
- Mr. G: Makes No Sense, 2008
- Humate: Love Stimulation, 2009
- Hell Feat. P Diddy: The DJ, 2009
- Dubfire: Rabid, 2009
- Steve Lawler: Hocus Pocus, 2009
- Dance Disorder: My Time, 2009
- Josh Wink: Stay Out All Night, 2010
- Simon Baker: Too Slow, 2010
- DJ Sneak: Southern Boy, 2010
- Paul Harris & Alex Tepper: Terris, 2010
- M.A.N.D.E.A.R: Buddies, 2011
- Agoria Feat. Carl Craig & La Scalars: Speechless, 2011
- Mousse T: Horny, 2011
- DJ Sodeyama: Life, 2011
- Midland: Bring Joy, 2011
- Slam: "Eterna", 2011
- Intruder feat. Jei: "Amame", 2012
- DJ W!LD feat. Hector Moralez: "Take A Trip", 2012

=== DJ mix compilations ===
- Radio Slave: Radio Slave Presents Creature Of The Night, 2006 (DJ mix album)
- Radio Slave: REKIDS Mixed By Radio Slave, 2007 (DJ mix album)
- Radio Slave: Misch Masch, 2007 (DJ mix album)
- Boris Dlugosch vs. Radio Slave: Radio Disco, 2007 (DJ mix album)
- Radio Slave: Fabric 48, 2009 (DJ mix album)
- Radio Slave: Radio Slave Presents Strictly Rhythm Vol. 5, 2010 (DJ mix album)
- Radio Slave: Slave To The Rhythm, 2011 (DJ mix album, produced with Mixmag)
