= Garden Gaia =

Studio album by Pantha du Prince
- Released: August 26, 2022
- Length: 44:09
- Label: Modern (A 792515)
- Producer: Hendrik Weber; Bendik Hovik Kjeldsberg; Tobias Levin

Pantha du Prince chronology
Conference of Trees (2020)	Garden Gaia (2022)

Singles from Garden Gaia
- 1. "Golden Galactic" Released: July 13, 2022

Garden Gaia is the ninth studio album by German electronic producer Pantha du Prince, released August 26, 2022, by Modern Recordings.

== Reception ==
Garden Gaia ratings
Aggregate scores
Source	Rating
Metacritic	77/100
Review scores
Source	Rating
AllMusic	4/5 stars
Beats Per Minute	80%
Pitchfork	6.7/10
Record Collector	3/5 stars

According to the review aggregator Metacritic, Garden Gaia received "generally favorable reviews" based on a weighted average score of 77 out of 100 from 4 critic scores.

== Track listing ==
All tracks are written by Hendrik Weber with others notes. All tracks produced by Weber except where noted

Garden Gaia track listing
No.	Title	Writer(s)	Producers	Length
1.	"Open Day"			4:43
2.	"Crystal Volcano"			4:14
3.	"Start a New Life"			5:16
4.	"Blume (Bendik HK Edit)"	Bendik Hovik Kjeldsberg	Kjeldsberg	5:14
5.	"Mother Drum"			5:27
6.	"Heaven Is Where You Are (Bendik HK Edit)"	Kjeldsberg	Kjeldsberg	4:45
7.	"Liquid Lights"			5:57
8.	"Alles fühlt"		Weber, Tobias Levin	4:04
9.	"Golden Galactic"	Friedrich Paravicini		4:29
Total length:				44:09

== Personnel ==
- Hendrik Weber – drums (2, 3), percussion (2, 4, 5), vocals (4, 6), bells (5), engineering (1–4, 6–9), programming (1, 7, 8)
- Håkon Stene – drums (1, 5), percussion (1, 2), Moog Guitar (1), additional recording (1, 5)
- Rob Waring – percussion (1, 5), drums (5), arranger (1), bells (5)
- Friedrich Wolf – drums (1), guitar (1, 4)
- Kassian Troyer – engineering
- Tobias Levin – engineering (1, 3, 8), programming (8)
- Friedrich Paravicini – cello (3, 9), violin (9), engineering (3, 9)
- Bendik Hovik Kjeldsberg – remixing (4, 6), engineering (4, 6), drum programming (4)
- Helena Tusvik Rosenlund – vocals (4)
