= Ovum Recordings =

- Founded: 1994
- Founder: Josh Wink and King Britt
- Location: Philadelphia

Ovum Recordings is a house music record label founded by Josh Wink and King Britt in October 1994. It is based in Philadelphia.

The label celebrated its 20th anniversary in 2014 with a world tour putting on a series of club events plus a special remix of the Josh Wink classic "Are You There?"

== Artists ==
The label initially gained media attention though Wink's own releases (through pseudonyms such as Winx and Size 9) though releases from other influential producers soon followed, including tracks from house music pioneers DJ Pierre and Lil Louis. (Louis is credited on Josh Wink on "How's Your Evening So Far?", a track based on a sample of Lil Louis' classic French Kiss.)

=== Other notable contributors ===
- Boo Williams
- DJ Pierre
- DJ Sneak
- Ian Pooley
- Jimpster
- KiNK
- Levon Vincent
- Loco Dice
- Stefan Goldmann
- Tom Middleton
