= The Dimension Gate =

Studio album by Aurora Sutra
- Released: March 1994
- Recorded: NHB-Studios (Hamburg, Germany)
- Genre: Dark wave, electronic, new age
- Length: 68:15
- Label: Talitha
- Producer: Peter Spilles

Aurora Sutra chronology
The Land of Harm and Appletrees (1993)	The Dimension Gate (1994)	Passing Over in Silence Towards Nuit (1996)

The Dimension Gate is the second studio album by Aurora Sutra, released in March 1994 by Talitha Records.

== Reception ==
Aiding & Abetting called The Dimension Gate "oddly dissonant" and "unsettling, especially with the lush backgrounds provided." The critic went on to say "the strange sounds created are worth studying in detail." Industrial Reviews awarded the album four out of five stars and praised the vocal performances while comparing the band favorably to Thine Eyes and Dead Can Dance. Sonic Boom called the album "A unique concept" and said "the vocalist has a deep haunting, almost melodic voice, coupled tightly with the upbeat story telling music, makes for interesting listening."

== Track listing ==
All tracks are written by Patricia Nigiani and Peter Spilles, except "Hide and Seek" by Howard Jones

Disc one – Aurora: The Dimension Gate
No.	Title	Length
1.	"Solar"	4:34
2.	"The Legend of Our Origin"	4:40
3.	"The Garden of Temptation"	3:13
4.	"In Search of the Unity"	6:48
5.	"Egypt"	3:35
6.	"Firenze"	5:14
7.	"Shadow Land"	6:00
8.	"The Quest"	3:18
9.	"The Marriage of Heaven and Earth"	4:17
10.	"Hide and Seek" (Howard Jones cover)	4:17

Disc two – Sutra: The Elements
No.	Title	Length
1.	"Element 1 Fire"	5:12
2.	"Element 2 Earth"	5:20
3.	"Element 3 Water"	4:15
4.	"Element 4 Air"	7:32

== Personnel ==
Adapted from The Dimension Gate liner notes.

Aurora Sutra

- Patricia Nigiani – lead vocals
- Peter Spilles – electronics, programming, vocals, production

Production and additional personnel

- Aurora – design
- André Menge – design
- Matthias Rewig – engineering

== Release history ==
Region	Date	Label	Format	Catalog
Germany	1994	Talitha	CD	CD SATE 10
United States	1994	Cleopatra	CD	CLEO 9417
