= YouANDme =

German musical artist

youANDme
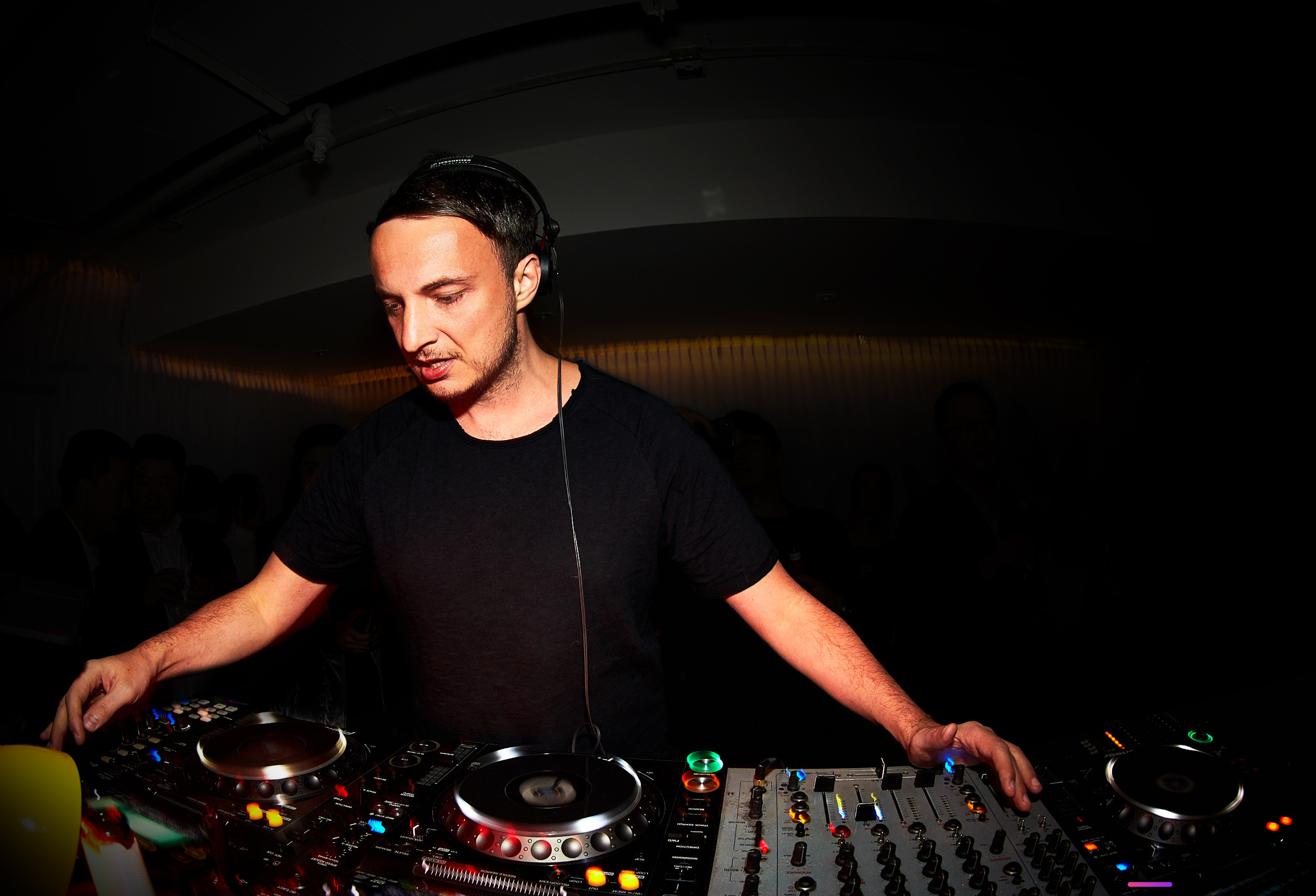
- youANDme performing in Beijing

Background information
- Born: Martin Müller
- Origin: Berlin, Germany
- Genres: House, Techno, Dub
- Occupations: DJ, Record producer, Label owner
- Years active: 2008–present
- Labels: Cocoon Recordings, Rekids, Desolat, Poker Flat Recordings, Defected Records, Nervous Records (US), Compost Records, Ornaments, Rotary Cocktail Recordings, Cutz#, Drumpoet Community, Mule Musiq
- Website: www.we-are-youandme.com

youANDme (stylized as youANDme) is a German house and techno project from Berlin, led by music producer, label owner and DJ Martin Müller. Active since 2008, releases have appeared on several record labels, including Cocoon Recordings, Defected Records, and Nervous Records (US).

== History and style ==
Founded in 2008 as a duo by Martin Müller and Daniel Ströter, the project has been led by Müller as a solo act since 2014. youANDme is part of the Berlin club scene, with a documented performance history at clubs like Berghain (Panorama Bar) spanning over a decade. The project has performed internationally; event listings and press coverage describe appearances outside Germany. Müller also operates under the alias youAND:THEMACHINES for specific album productions.

The debut album Behind (2013, Ornaments) is characterised by analogue production and structured dramaturgy. The sound incorporates influences from Carl Craig and Detroit techno. Among the vinyl editions, a limited run of 333 copies featured covers individually hand-painted by Müller using action painting techniques. The release has been described as a "milestone" of the label catalogue due to the absence of samples across six vinyl sides. The production also exhibits a kinship to the sound of Rhythm & Sound. The remix edition, Behind LP Reshaped (2014), features contributions from Matthew Herbert, Steve Bug, and Legowelt, and was named "Album of the Month" by Faze Magazin.

In 2009, the mix CD Ornaments Symphony was released, utilising a technical approach of mixing with four turntables without digital post-production.

Prior to youANDme, Müller produced as Dubsuite with Holger Flinsch; the project's 2006 album Eigenleben is classified as "ambient textures of dub techno". Upon its 2016 reissue, the album was compared to Basic Channel, Biosphere, and Monolake.

== Career and labels ==
youANDme has released music on international imprints including Cocoon Recordings, Rekids, Desolat, Poker Flat Recordings, Defected Records, Nervous Records (US), Compost Records, and Mule Musiq. The production emphasises analogue techniques.

The project was listed alongside Harry Romero and Louie Vega as part of the Nervous Records artist roster during the label's 25th anniversary. The youANDme remix of Mind Feeling (2009) was licensed by Sven Väth for the compilation The Sound of the 10th Season on Cocoon Recordings and was described by the source as his “first underground hit”. The track “Jungle Book” on Cocoon Compilation O was singled out in reviews of the compilation.

Tracks by youANDme were featured on BBC Radio 1 from Pete Tong, The Blessed Madonna, and Danny Howard, including features on the Essential Mix. The track Quince was included in a BBC Radio 1 Hall of Fame segment. International radio show support includes Roger Sanchez and Bob Sinclar. In 2014, Müller performed for the German radio show You FM Clubnight (formerly HR3 Clubnight).

His edit of Moodymann's It's 2 Late 4 U And Me was reviewed as a "treasure" and named "House of the Month" by Raveline. Müller also operates the labels Rotary Cocktail Recordings and Cutz#.

== Touring ==
Müller performs internationally as a DJ, with appearances across Europe, North America, South America, Africa, Asia, China, India, and Australia/New Zealand. In 2019, he performed for the German Embassy in Nicaragua during celebrations for the 30th anniversary of the Fall of the Berlin Wall.

Festival and club appearances include Sónar (Barcelona), Epizode (Vietnam), KaZantip (Ukraine), Chi Wow Wah Town (Australia), Shipwrecked (New Zealand), Fusion Festival, SonneMondSterne, D-Edge, Destino Pacha Ibiza, and Space (Ibiza nightclub).

== Selected discography ==
=== Albums ===
- 2006: Eigenleben (as Dubsuite with Holger Flinsch, Stadtgruen)
- 2013: Behind (as youAND:THEMACHINES, Ornaments)
- 2014: Behind LP Reshaped (as youAND:THEMACHINES, Ornaments)
- 2016: Eigenleben Reissue (as Dubsuite with Holger Flinsch, Ornaments)

=== Mix CDs ===
- 2009: Ornaments Symphony (Ornaments)

=== Singles & EPs (Selected) ===
- 2011: Raw (Cocoon Recordings)
- 2015: Take Away (feat. Black Soda, Desolat)
- 2015: Jungle Book (Cocoon Recordings)
- 2016: Reflection (with The Analog Roland Orchestra feat. Black Soda, Poker Flat)
- 2016: About You / Listen To (with Tim Toh, Nervous Records)
- 2017: All Comes Back (feat. Gjaezon, Drumpoet Community)
- 2018: Pattern Of Greed (feat. Ingrid Arthur, Poker Flat)
- 2019: Claret Loss (Cocoon Recordings)
- 2019: Traveller (with Tim Toh, Poker Flat)
- 2020: I Hear You (with Steve Bug feat. Black Soda, Rotary Cocktail Recordings)
- 2022: Moment (feat. Kristina Sheli, DFTD/Defected)
- 2023: Swell | Repeat (incl. Kenny Larkin and Renato Ratier Remixes, Rotary Cocktail Recordings)
- 2025: Believe (feat. Black Soda, Compost Records)

=== Selected Remixes ===
- Moodymann – It's 2 Late 4 U And Me (youANDme Edit)
- Carl Craig – Darkness (youANDme Remix)
- Radio Slave – K-Maze (youANDme Remix)
- Steve Bug – Pelican Glide (youANDme Remix)
- Timo Maas feat. Katie Cruel – Articulation (youANDme Remix)
- Lawrence vs. Seth Troxler – Miles In Aphrika (youANDme Edit)
