= Eon:Eon =

Studio album by Project Pitchfork
- Released: October 5, 1998
- Recorded: NHB-Studios Hamburg, April–June 1998
- Genre: Electro-industrial, darkwave
- Label: EastWest Records
- Producer: Jürgen Jansen, Peter Spilles

Project Pitchfork chronology
¡Chakra:Red! (1997)	Eon:Eon (1998)	Daimonion (2001)

Singles from Eon:Eon
- 1. "Carnival"; 2. "Steelrose"; 3. "I Live Your Dream"

Eon:Eon is the 7th studio album by the German electronic music group Project Pitchfork. It was released on October 5, 1998, through EastWest Records. The album reached #14 on the German album charts and #25 on the CMJ RPM Charts in the U.S. Three songs from the album was released as singles: "Carnival", "Steelrose" and "I Live Your Dream".

== Track listing ==
No.	Title	Length
1.	"Carnival"	4:15
2.	"Realm Center"	4:06
3.	"Hunted"	4:30
4.	"Resist"	3:57
5.	"Rescue"	5:05
6.	"Karma Monster"	3:52
7.	"Our Destiny"	4:20
8.	"Eon"	4:09
9.	"Orange Moon"	4:10
10.	"Dreamer"	4:02
11.	"Wish"	4:17
12.	"I Live Your Dream"	4:26
13.	"Steelrose"	4:01

=== Limited Edition Bonus Disc ===
No.	Title	Length
1.	"Angels"	4:25
2.	"Temper Of Poseidon"	3:48
3.	"Odyssee"	6:37

== Reception ==
Eon:Eon received positive acclaim, being complimented for its modern, richer and experimental sound, "very difficult to classify". This album moved the band up into the Top 15 of the charts. Title song of the single "I Live Your Dream" was by many believed to be a "perfect pop song". Amazon.com editor Steve Landau gave this album 3/5 and said "This disc chugs along dutifully, but the excitement is sparse and fitful. It's a shame, really, because the songs that do succeed here are among the best this German electro band has ever written." Dark music website "gothicparadise.com" gave it 3.5/5 and commented "Eon:Eon would have made an excellent EP with vocalist Peter Spilles attempting a smoldering sultriness, it's a middling effort by a band whose best work is clearly behind them. However, it is a clear improvement of 97th "!Chakra:Red!", with its appealing melodies and uplifting choruses."
