= Passing Over in Silence Towards Nuit =

Studio album by Aurora Sutra
- Released: October 14, 1996
- Recorded: Winter 1995 – 1996
- Studio: NHB-Studios (Hamburg, Germany)
- Genre: Dark wave; electronic; new age
- Length: 50:36
- Label: Sound Factory
- Producer: Rodney Orpheus

Aurora Sutra chronology
The Dimension Gate (1994)	Passing Over in Silence Towards Nuit (1996)	I and I Shall Descend (1998)

Passing Over in Silence Towards Nuit is the third studio album by Aurora Sutra, released on October 14, 1996, by Sound Factory.

== Track listing ==
No.	Title	Lyrics	Music	Length
1.	"My Beloved"	Patricia Nigiani	Eric Burton	5:22
2.	"Totem"	D.A. Mark; Nigiani	D.A. Mark	6:49
3.	"Dreaming the Initiatory Snakebite"	Nigiani	Mark	5:26
4.	"Spring Thaw"	Nigiani	Ian Christ	5:51
5.	"Our Love Coil"	Nigiani	Mark	6:30
6.	"Unveiled Adoration O'Mine"	Nigiani	Mark	5:51
7.	"Moon Behind Moon"	Nigiani	Mark	5:04
8.	"Chant to the Angels"	Nigiani	Mark	9:43

== Personnel ==
Adapted from Passing Over in Silence Towards Nuit liner notes.

Aurora Sutra

- Patricia Nigiani – lead vocals, arrangements

Additional performers

- Eric Burton – vocals (1, 5)
- Ian Christ – acoustic guitars (1, 4), bass guitar (1)
- Anja Schmittler – violin (1)
- Tippy-A-Go-Go – percussion (2, 3, 5, 7, 8), vocals (2, 5, 6, 7), bottles (2, 7), guitar (5, 8), recorder (2), drum guitar (3), backing vocals (3), bass guitar (8)

Production and design

- Rodney Orpheus – production
- Matthias Rewig – mastering

== Release history ==
Region	Date	Label	Format	Catalog
Germany	1996	Sound Factory	CD	35900422(42)
