= This Bliss =

Studio album by Pantha du Prince
- Released: 29 January 2007
- Genre: Minimal techno
- Length: 74:14
- Label: Dial
- Producer: Hendrik Weber

Pantha du Prince chronology
Diamond Daze (2004)	This Bliss (2007)	Black Noise (2010)

This Bliss is the second studio album by German electronic music producer Pantha du Prince. It was released on 29 January 2007 by Dial Records.

Two of the album's tracks, "Urlichten" and "Walden 2", had been released prior to the album on the "Lichten"/"Walden" 12" single.

== Critical reception ==
Professional ratings
Review scores
Source	Rating
AllMusic	4/5 stars
Pitchfork	7.7/10
Resident Advisor	5/5
Stylus Magazine	A−

The New York Times critic Jon Caramanica described This Bliss as Pantha du Prince's "high-water mark", "a pensive, slender and tough album".

This Bliss was named the 55th best album of the 2000s by Resident Advisor.

== Track listing ==
All tracks are written by Hendrik Weber, except where noted

No.	Title	Writer(s)	Length
1.	"Asha"		6:31
2.	"Saturn Strobe"	Howard Skempton	7:27
3.	"Walden 2"		10:32
4.	"Moonstruck"		5:36
5.	"Eisbaden"		7:04
6.	"Urlichten"		12:09
7.	"White Out"		6:18
8.	"Florac"		6:04
9.	"Steiner im Flug"		6:30
10.	"Seeds of Sleep"		6:03
Total length:			74:14
