= Cocoon Recordings =

German record label

Cocoon
- Founded: 2000
- Founder: Sven Väth
- Genre: Techno, minimal techno, techhouse
- Country of origin: Germany
- Location: Frankfurt
- Official website: http://www.cocoon.net/

Cocoon Recordings is a record label founded in 2000 and operated by DJ and electronic music producer Sven Väth. Based in Frankfurt, Germany, Cocoon is a division of the Cocoon Music Event GmbH.

Väth founded Cocoon Recordings in order to complete the Cocoon platform as a supporting tool for young artists in electronic music.

== Notable artists ==
- Adam Beyer
- Anthony Rother
- Guy Gerber
- Guy J
- Legowelt
- Loco Dice
- Minilogue
- Phil Kieran
- Ricardo Villalobos
- Stefan Goldmann
- Sven Väth
- youANDme
- Zombie Nation

== Notable releases ==
=== Singles / EPs ===
- 2010 Simon Wish "Dawn's Highway" (10")
- 2009 Stefan Goldmann "Yes To All" (12")
- 2007 Guy Gerber "Late bloomers" (12")
- 2006 Guy Gerber "This Is Balagan" (12")
- 2006 Guy Gerber & Shlomi Aber "Sea Of Sand" (12")
- 2005 Väth vs. Rother "Komm" (12")
- 2005 Oliver Koletzki "Der Mückenschwarm" (12")
- 2002 Legowelt "Disco Rout" (12")

=== Albums ===
- 2009 Phil Kieran "Shh" (CD, vinyl)

=== Compilations ===
- 2011 "Various Artists" - Cocoon Compilation K (CD, unmixed)
- 2010 Various Artists - Sven Vath In The Mix - The Sound Of The Eleventh Season (2CD, mixed)
- 2010 Various Artists - Cocoon Compilation J (CD, unmixed)
- 2009 Various Artists - Sven Vath In The Mix - The Sound Of The Tenth Season (2CD, mixed)
- 2009 Various Artists - Cocoon Compilation I (CD, unmixed)
- 2008 Various Artists - Sven Vath In The Mix - The Sound Of The Ninth Season (2CD, mixed)
- 2008 Various Artists - Cocoon Compilation H (CD, unmixed)
- 2007 Various Artists - Sven Vath In The Mix - The Sound Of The Eighth Season (2CD, mixed)
- 2007 Various Artists - Raresh & André Galuzzi - Freak Show (2CD, mixed)
- 2007 Various Artists - Cocoon Compilation G (CD, unmixed)
- 2006 Various Artists - Sven Vath In The Mix - The Sound Of The Seventh Season (2CD, mixed)
- 2006 Various Artists - Cocoon Compilation F (CD, unmixed)
- 2005 Various Artists - Sven Vath In The Mix - The Sound Of The Sixth Season (2CD, mixed)
- 2006 Various Artists - Väth & Hawtin In The Mix - The Sound Of The Third Season (2CD, mixed)
- 2004 Various Artists - Loco Dice & Villalobos - Green & Blue (2CD, mixed)
- 2003 Various Artists - Funk D'Void - iFunk (CD, mixed)
- 2003 Various Artists - Ricardo Villalobos - Taka Taka (CD, mixed)
- 2002 Various Artists - Cocoon Compilation C (CD, unmixed)
- 2001 Various Artists - Steve Bug - presents The Flow (CD, mixed)
- 2001 Various Artists - Cocoon Compilation B (CD, unmixed)
- 2000 Various Artists - Cocoon Compilation A (CD, unmixed)

== See also ==
- List of electronic music record labels
- Electronic music
- Techno music
