= Dial Records (1999) =

German music label

- Founded: 1999
- Founder: Peter M. Kersten; Paul Kominek; David Lieske
- Genre: Techno; House
- Country of origin: Germany
- Location: Berlin
- Official website: http://www.dial-rec.de/

Dial Records is a music label focusing primarily on post-minimalist dance music (a.k.a. deep house). It was founded in 1999 in Hamburg, Germany by Peter M. Kersten, Paul Kominek and David Lieske. The Label has released a number of influential 12" and full-length albums by artists such as Lawrence, Carsten Jost, Pantha du Prince, Efdemin, John Roberts and others.

== Dial Records Catalogue ==
- _{DIAL 00} Various – Untitled
- _{DIAL 01} Lawrence – Sporturlaub
- _{DIAL 02} Carsten Jost – Elmenreich
- _{DIAL 03} Various – Hoteleins - City
- _{DIAL 04} Various – Hamburgeins 01
- _{DIAL 05} Various – Hamburgeins 02
- _{DIAL 06} Various – Hamburgeins 03
- _{DIAL 07} Carsten Jost – Make Pigs Pay
- _{DIAL 08} Pawel – Into Pieces
- _{DIAL 09} Lawrence – Corporate Identity
- _{DIAL 10} Various – Split
- _{DIAL 11} Pantha du Prince – Nowhere
- _{DIAL 12} Sten – TV
- _{DIAL 13} Various – Hamburgerberg - Antifaschistische Aktion
- _{DIAL 14} Alexander Polzin – Get Used To It
- _{DIAL 15} Lawrence – Neighbourhood
- _{DIAL 16} Various – The Lost Tracks
- _{DIAL 17} Sten – Eccentric
- _{DIAL 18} Efdemin – Kleine Wirrniss EP
- _{DIAL 19} Carsten Jost – The Lost Tracks 2
- _{DIAL 20} Pawel – Grab It
- _{DIAL 21} Lawrence – Winter Green
- _{DIAL 22} Denis Karimani – War Es Nicht
- _{DIAL 23} Pantha du Prince – Butterfly Girl Versions
- _{DIAL 24} Efdemin – Bruxelles
- _{DIAL 25} Dominique – Speak To Me
- _{DIAL 26} JaKönigJa – Ebba
- _{DIAL 27} nike.bordom – Music For Non-Existing Dancefloors
- _{DIAL 28} Sten – Take Me To The Fridge
- _{DIAL 29} Pantha du Prince – Lichten / Walden
- _{DIAL 30} Various – Bergwein
- _{DIAL 31} Lawrence – Deep Summer Hole
- _{DIAL 32} Pawel – Ceramics
- _{DIAL 33} Pigon – Little Albio Street
- _{DIAL 34} Various – Split
- _{DIAL 35} Carsten Jost – Atlantis I & II
- _{DIAL 36} Sten – Undercover
- _{DIAL 37} Lawrence – Pond
- _{DIAL 38} Dirk von Lowtzow – Septem Sermones ad Mortuos
- _{DIAL 39} Pigon – Promises
- _{DIAL 40} Various – You Are My Mate

=== Compact Disc Releases ===
- _{DIALCD 00} Various – Hamburgeins
- _{DIALCD 01} Carsten Jost – You Don't Need A Weatherman To Know Which Way The Wind Blows
- _{DIALCD 02} Lawrence – Lawrence
- _{DIALCD 03} Glühen 4 – Das Schweigen der Sirenen
- _{DIALCD 04} Lawrence – The Absence Of Blight
- _{DIALCD 05} Pantha du Prince – Diamond Daze
- _{DIALCD 06} Sten – Leaving The Frantic
- _{DIALCD 07} Lawrence – The Night Will Last Forever
- _{DIALCD 08} Phillip Sollmann – Something Is Missing
- _{DIALCD 09} Pantha du Prince – This Bliss
- _{DIALCD 10} Efdemin – Efdemin

== See also ==
- List of record labels
