= The Land of Harm and Appletrees =

Studio album by Aurora
- Released: September 3, 1993
- Recorded: NHB-Studios (Hamburg, Germany)
- Genre: Dark wave, electronic
- Length: 44:10
- Label: Talitha
- Producer: Peter Spilles

Aurora Sutra chronology
The Land of Harm and Appletrees (1993)	The Dimension Gate (1994)

The Land of Harm and Appletrees is the debut studio album by Aurora Sutra, released on September 3, 1993, by Talitha Records.

== Reception ==
Industrial Reviews awarded The Land of Harm and Appletrees four out of five stars and attributed the album's success to its use of sonic layering and acoustics as well as the vocal performances of Patricia Nigiani and Peter Spilles.

== Track listing ==
All tracks are written by Patricia Nigiani and Peter Spilles.

No.	Title	Length
1.	"Regression"	4:15
2.	"In a Minute"	5:04
3.	"The Dream"	6:13
4.	"Posen 1793"	4:44
5.	"The Land of Harm and Appletrees"	5:41
6.	"Hereafter"	4:58
7.	"Floating Dolphins"	4:01
8.	"Ritual"	3:21
9.	"Crusaders"	5:53

== Personnel ==
Adapted from The Land of Harm and Appletrees liner notes.

Aurora

- Patricia Nigiani – vocals
- Peter Spilles – electronics, programming, production

Production and additional personnel

- Aurora – cover art, design
- Matthias Rewig – engineering

== Release history ==
Region	Date	Label	Format	Catalog
Germany	1993	Talitha	CD	CD SATE 03
United States	1993	Cleopatra	CD, CS	CLEO 9493
