= Black (Project Pitchfork album) =

Studio album by Project Pitchfork
- Released: January 25, 2013
- Genre: Electro-industrial, EBM
- Label: Trisol Music Group, Candyland Entertainment, Prussia Records
- Producer: Peter Spilles

Project Pitchfork chronology
Quantum Mechanics (2011)	Black (2013)	Blood (2014)

Singles from Black
- 1. "Rain"

Black is a 2013 album by the German Electro-industrial band Project Pitchfork. It is their 14th studio album and was released in multiple formats, including a double-disc deluxe version, featuring two b-sides and three remixes. The song "Rain" was released as a music video to promote the record.

== Track listing ==
1. "Pitch-Black" – 8:00
2. "Drums of death" – 5:41
3. "Enchanted Dots Of Light" – 5:06
4. "The Circus" – 4:16
5. "Rain" – 5:31
6. "Contract" – 4:35
7. "Storm Flower" – 4:19
8. "Acid Ocean" – 6:14
9. "Black Sanctuary" – 5:52
10. "Nil" – 7:28

=== Deluxe Edition Bonus Disc ===
1. "Midnight Moon Misery" – 6:07
2. "Onyx" – 5:14
3. "The Circus (RMX)" – 5:15
4. "Acid Ocean (RMX)" – 6:20
5. "Pitch-Black (RMX)" – 7:25

== Deluxe Edition ==
Limited 2CD Deluxe Edition was strictly limited to 2,000 copies and includes:

- Opulent double CD (14 x 21 cm approx)
- Hardback book, bound in cloth
- Lettering and title screen-printed in vintage style
- Black foil-blocked scrying mirror
- Embossed PROJECT PITCHFORK logo
- Special CD trays made from black paper
- Front and rear end papers (black 260g Boston paper)
- 36 pages, high grade art print on high quality 130g art paper with lavish Singer® sewn signatures
- Booklet includes all lyrics and additional artwork
- Two exclusive tracks
- Three exclusive remixes

== Reception ==
German reviewer Zander Buel talked about the album's genres and said that "The synth textures exist outside of both Futurepop and Aggrotech, inspired by a place far beyond those genres that still somehow manages to sound in line with them. And, of course, Peter Spilles’s vocals remain at the forefront as harsh, scathing, and venomous, but with as much passion as ever". Dark music website "gothicparadise.com" gave the album 4.5/5, saying that "With all of this diversity mixed with the classic, pounding styles, we have a great, dynamic album. With the heavy hitting bass and grinding, pulsating synths and beats mixed with the dark, deep vocals creates the tried and true sound we've grown to love over the years".
