= Project Pitchfork =

German dark wave/industrial music group

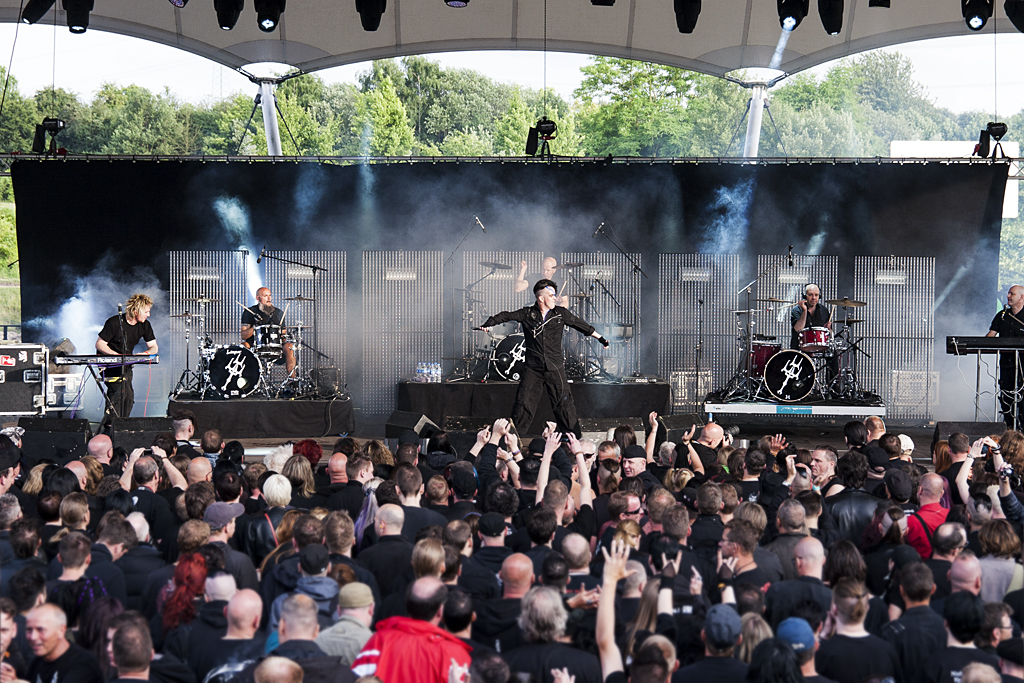
- Project Pitchfork performing in 2013

Background information
- Origin: Hamburg, Germany
- Genres: Electronica; dark wave; electro-industrial; EBM; futurepop
- Years active: 1989–present
- Labels: Candyland Entertainment; Trisol Music Group; EastWest; Karma Records (South America); Hypnobeat; Off Beat
- Spinoffs: Rec; IMATEM; Santa Hates You; Aurora Sutra; Jansen Spilles
- Members: Peter Spilles; Jürgen Jansen
- Past members: Dirk Scheuber; Markus Giltjes; Yenz Schrader; Patricia Nigiani; Carsten Klatte
- Website: project-pitchfork.eu

Project Pitchfork are a German dark wave and electronic music group from Hamburg.

== History ==
=== Early years (1990–1994) ===
Project Pitchfork were formed by Peter Spilles and Dirk Scheuber. After agreeing to work together, they picked the project's name by choosing a random word from the dictionary. The band gave their first performance in Hamburg in February 1990 and released their demo, K.N.K.A, in August. In May 1991, their debut album Dhyani was released. The band's second album, Lam-'Bras was released in February 1992 and yielded the first vocal appearance of Patrica Nigiani. Six months later, the band's third album, Entities was released. The band switched labels to Off Beat for their 1994 release Io. The album featured two singles, "Renascence" and "Carrion", and marked the first time the band entered the German Charts. The album was followed by a lengthy German tour.

=== Development years and success (1995–2002) ===
In 1995, Project Pitchfork established their own label, Candyland Entertainment, through which they would release the majority of their material as well as some side projects and bands such as Philtron and Deep Red. 1995 also saw the release of two EPs, CH'I and Corps d'Amour, and one album, Alpha Omega. The year finished off with a tour supported by Rammstein. The next Project Pitchfork studio album ¡Chakra:Red! was released in 1997. It was the first album since Dhyani to be written as a group effort, rather than by Peter Spilles alone, and the first to include Jürgen Jansen as a permanent band member.

Immediately after their first US tour in 1998, Project Pitchfork returned with concept album Eon:Eon, their first while signed to label EastWest, an imprint of the major label Warner Music. The album yielded three singles, "Steelrose", "Carnival", and "I Live Your Dream". With the support of EastWest, the band had greater resources available to produce videos for their music, which led to their being the first gothic industrial band to receive airplay on music TV in Germany. The video for "Steelrose" earned the band a nomination for an Echo Award for Best Video National.

Between 1998 and 2001, the band built out their own studio which gave them more time to develop their next release. In 2001, the band released their eighth studio album Daimonion and supported the album with a European tour. In 2002 the band released the "NUN" trilogy which consisted of album Inferno and EPs View From a Throne and Trialog. This earned the band another nomination for an Echo Award, this time for Best Alternative Act National.

=== Recent years (2003–present) ===
Project Pitchfork returned with album Kaskade in 2005. In February 2009 the band released Dream, Tiresias! which received praise from electronic music magazine, ReGen. In 2010 the band's follow up album Continuum Ride was released along with a video to support the song "Beholder." Continuum Ride was inspired by the band's US tour in 2009, particularly their experience of Detroit, whose dilapidated skyline led to a more "dark and destructive" sound than that of their previous album. By 2011 Project Pitchfork ceased operating their Candyland label, having since begun releasing their work on the Trisol label.

The band released Quantum Mechanics in 2011 as well as a video for the album's second track, "Lament". Later that year the band released a compilation album titled First Anthology. In 2013 the band released their fourteenth studio album, Black, and a music video to accompany the song "Rain". In June 2014, the band announced via their official website a new album titled Blood. To promote the record the band held a pre-release show in Hamburg. The album was released in September and featured a music video for "Blood-Diamond (See Him Running)" edited by Peter Spilles himself.

In 2016, Project Pitchfork released their Second Anthology, a double CD that included one new track, several unreleased rarities, and many re-recorded and remastered tracks. Also in 2016, the band released the album Look Up, I'm Down There to commemorate their 25th anniversary. The album was released in two versions: a standard CD release and a special, limited edition double CD with an 80-page art book containing complete lyrics and a short story by the fantasy author Björn Springorum.

In 2018, the band released the album Akkretion, the first of what was planned to be a trilogy of albums for release that year. On 12 October 2018, the second part of the trilogy, Fragment, was released.

Starting in 2019, Trisol began releasing reissues of all the band's material over the previous decade from Dream, Tiresias! through Look Up, I'm Down There.

On 2 March 2021, the band announced that cofounder and keyboardist Dirk Scheuber had left the band.

In 2024 the band release "Elysium" the third and final act of cosmic electro trilogy that started with "Akkretion". To support the album release the band will commence a German tour in April 2024 with one date in the UK during May and will play various festivals.

== Band members ==
Current

- Peter Spilles – vocals (1989–present)
- Jürgen Jansen – keyboards (1996–present)
- Achim Färber – live drums (1999–present)
- Christian "Leo" Leonhardt – live drums (1999–present)

Past

- Dirk Scheuber – keyboards (1989–2021)
- Patricia Nigiani – backing vocals, live keyboards (1992–1994)
- Markus Giltjes – live drums (1995)
- Yenz Schrader – drums, guitars (1998)
- Carsten Klatte – live guitars (1999–2011)

Timeline

== Discography ==
=== Studio albums ===
- Dhyani (1991)
- Lam-'Bras (1992)
- Entities (1992)
- IO (1994)
- Alpha Omega (1995)
- ¡Chakra:Red! (1997)
- Eon:Eon (1998)
- Daimonion (2001)
- Inferno (2002)
- Kaskade (2005)
- Dream, Tiresias! (2009)
- Continuum Ride (2010)
- Quantum Mechanics (2011)
- Black (2013)
- Blood (2014)
- Look Up, I'm Down There (2016)
- Akkretion (2018)
- Fragment (2018)
- Elysium (2024)

=== EPs ===
- Precious New World (1991)
- Psychic Torture (1991)
- Souls/Island (1993)
- Little IO (1994)
- CH'I (1995)
- Corps D'Amour (1995)
- Trialog (2002)
- View From a Throne (2002)
- Wonderland/One Million Faces (2007)

=== Live albums ===
- Live '97 (1997)
- Live 2003/2001 (2003)

=== Compilations ===
- The Early Years (89–93) (1996)
- Collector: Lost and Found (2001)
- NUN Trilogy (2002)
- Collector: Fireworks & Colorchange (2003)
- First Anthology (2011)
- Second Anthology (2016)

=== Singles ===
- "Carrion" (1993)
- "Renascence" (1994)
- "En Garde!" (1996)
- "Carnival" (1998)
- "Steelrose" (1998)
- "I Live Your Dream" (1999)
- "Existence" (2001)
- "Timekiller" (2001) – #19 DAC Top 50 Singles of 2001, Germany
- "Awakening" (2002)
- "Schall Und Rauch/The Future Is Now" (2005)
- "Earth Song" (feat. Sara Noxx) (2008)
- "Feel!" (2009)
- "Beholder" (2010)
- "Lament" (2011)
- "Rain" (2013)

== Videography ==
- Va I Luce (1992)
- Entities Tour (1993)
- Glowing Like Io – Live Performance (1994)
- Alpha Omega – Live (1995)
- Live '99 (1999)
- Collector – Adapted for the Screen (2002)
- Live 2003 (2004)
