= Kaskade (Project Pitchfork album) =

Studio album by Project Pitchfork
- Released: July 12, 2005
- Genre: Electro-industrial, EBM
- Label: Metropolis Records, Candyland Entertainment, Prussia Records
- Producer: Peter Spilles

Project Pitchfork chronology
Inferno (2002)	Kaskade (2005)	Dream, Tiresias! (2009)

Singles from Kaskade
- 1. "Schall Und Rauch/The Future Is Now"

Kaskade is a 2005 album by the German Electro-industrial band Project Pitchfork. It is their 10th studio album and was released in multiple formats, including a double-vinyl Limited Digi pack, including hardback book format, which comes with a 20-page booklet. Single "Schall Und Rauch/The Future Is Now" was released to promote the record.

== Track listing ==
1. "Instead Of An Angle" – 4:38
2. "The Future Is Now" – 5:16
3. "Beautiful-Logic-Strings" – 4:43
4. "Dance In The Air" – 3:53
5. "Fleischverstärker" – 4:56
6. "The Touch" – 3:57
7. "Abyss" – 3:47
8. "A.Dream" – 4:12
9. "The Present" – 3:47
10. "Chains" – 4:45
11. "Your Tempting Fantasy" – 4:26
12. "Echoes" – 4:41
13. "Schall Und Rauch" – 4:40
14. "Merry-Go-Round-To-Hell" – 4:49
15. "It's Spring" – 4:08

== Production ==
Album was entirely written and composed by Peter Spilles, Dirk Scheuber and Jurgen Jansen and was recorded without Scheuber's participation in Hamburg at "Candyland Studios", which is their label's studio.

== Reception ==
Allmusic reviewer Rick Anderson commented, "Despite some interesting and at times even beautiful chord progressions, Spilles' vocals remain almost entirely tuneless. And if they're going to insist on singing in English, they might want to run their lyrics past a native speaker before committing to tape. But there are some very fine moments here, including the funky "Chains," the rockish "Echoes," and the downright catchy "Merry-Go-Round to Hell." Not bad overall." Peter Marks from "releasemagazine.net" gave "Kaskade" 8/10 and said "I cannot praise Peter, Dirk and Jurgen enough for the variation (once again) which they pack into this album. The choruses have never sounded better. Project Pitchfork truly have gotten their mojo back." Lykle of "Gothtronic.com" gave the album 3.5/5 commenting "Remarkable is the bigger role for the guitars this time, but this doesn't go at the cost of the subtle nuances the band is known for. Once again the cryptic lyrics are great as well, so we can speak of one of the better Project Pitchfork releases;"
