= Blood (Project Pitchfork album) =

Studio album by Project Pitchfork
- Released: September 19, 2014
- Genres: Electro-industrial, EBM, Dark wave
- Length: 1:19:35
- Labels: Trisol Music Group, Candyland Entertainment, Prussia Records
- Producer: Peter Spilles

Project Pitchfork chronology
Black (2013)	Blood (2014)

Blood is a 2014 album by the German electro-industrial band Project Pitchfork. It is their 15th studio album and was released in multiple formats, including a double-disc limited edition, featuring two B-sides and three remixes. A music video for "Blood-Diamond (See Him Running)" was released on October, 19th 2014.

== Track listing ==
1. "Blood-Line (Never)" – 5:49
2. "Blood-Loss (Sometimes)" – 4:02
3. "Blood-Stained (Give Me Your Body)" – 4:22
4. "Blood-Money (No More)" – 4:00
5. "Blood-Moon (Romance)" – 4:50
6. "Blood-Diamond (See Him Running)" – 5:41
7. "Blood-Pressure (Just For My Pleasure)" – 4:43
8. "Blood-Shed (Dark River)" – 4:51
9. "Blood-Game (For You)" – 4:29
10. "Blood-Lust (Mental Island)" – 5:01
11. "Blood-Stream (Will I Be)" – 4:18

=== Limited 2CD Special Edition ===
1. "Blood-Night" – 5:50
2. "Blood-Thirst" – 4:35
3. "Blood-Stained (RMX)" – 5:15
4. "Blood-Money (RMX)" – 6:20
5. "Blood-Line (RMX)" – 6:32

== Limited 2CD Special Edition ==
Limited 2CD Deluxe Edition was strictly limited to 2,000 copies and includes:

• Opulent double CD

• Hardback book

• Black front and rear endpapers

• 40 pages, (14 x 21 cm approx)

• Booklet consisting of paper and blood red, transparent foil

• High grade art print on high quality art paper with durable thread stitching

• Booklet includes all lyrics and additional artwork

• Two exclusive tracks

• Three exclusive remixes
