= Nina Kraviz =

Russian DJ, music producer, and singer

Nina Kraviz Нина Кравиц
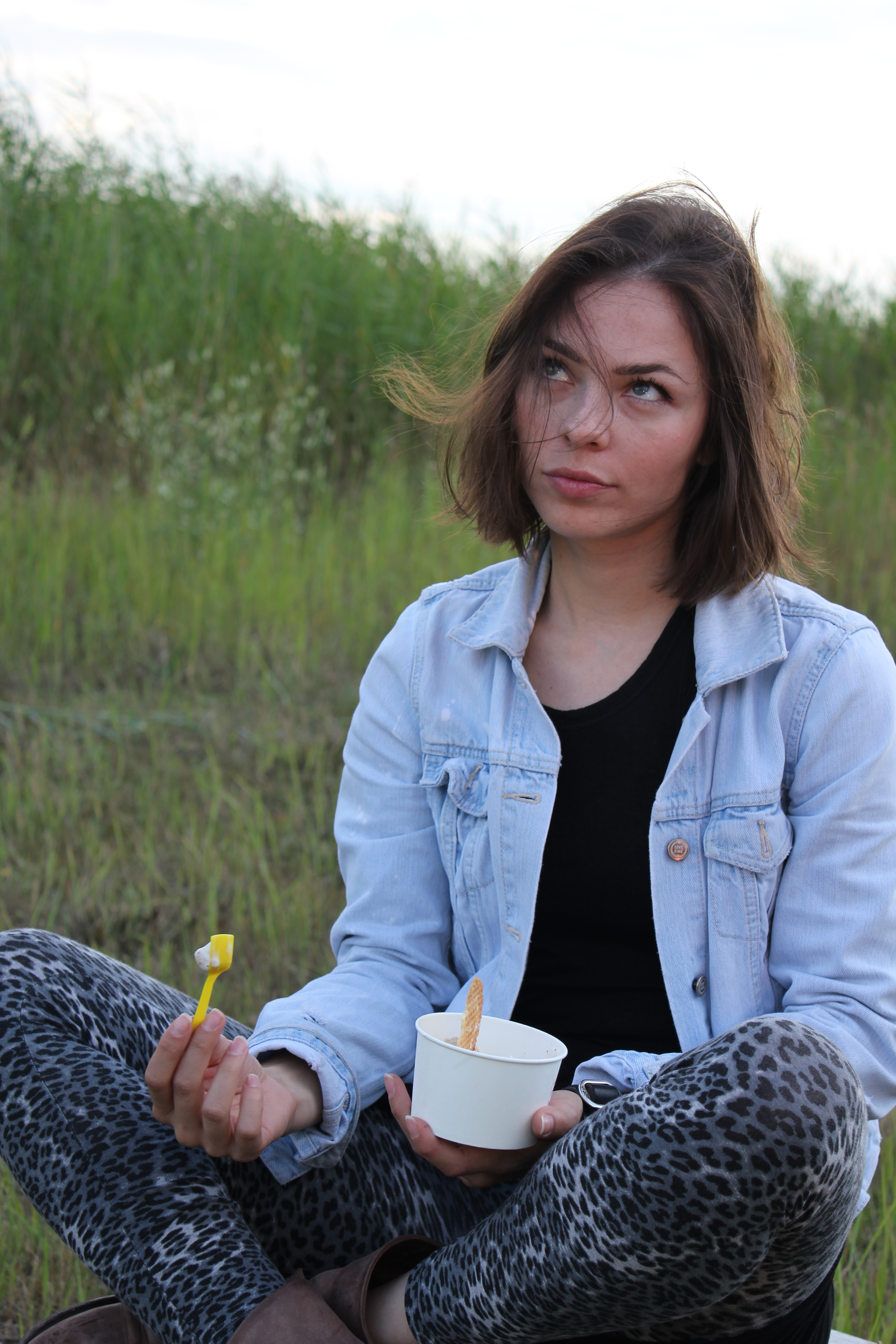
- Nina Kraviz in 2012

Background information
- Born: Nina Kraviz; Irkutsk, Russian SFSR, Soviet Union
- Genres: Techno; tech house; minimal; electronica; acid house
- Occupations: Record producer; DJ; Dentist
- Years active: 2008–present
- Label: Rekids, Underground Quality, Naïf, BPitch Control, The Gym, трип, GALAXIID

Nina Kraviz (Russian: Нина Кравиц) is a Russian DJ, music producer and singer.

== Early life and career ==
Kraviz was born and raised in Irkutsk, Siberia, Russia. She moved to Moscow to study dentistry where she later gained her residency. Kraviz also worked in a number of roles in the early 2000s before she started her music career, including fixing "cosmonauts' teeth", hosting a local Irkutsk radio show, writing for a fanzine, and holding a club residency on Friday nights.

In 2005, Kraviz was accepted into the Red Bull Music Academy in Seattle, however could not attend as she could not obtain a visa, attending the following year in Melbourne instead. By 2008, she was playing a regular night at the Propaganda Club in Moscow.

Kraviz released her self-titled debut album in February 2012 through the Rekids record label, to mixed-positive reviews. She started her own record label in 2014, named трип (English: Trip). She mixed the forty-eighth DJ-Kicks mix album, which was released in January 2015.

Kraviz took part in writing the music for the 2020 game Cyberpunk 2077. She also voiced her cameo in the game itself, in Russian and English versions. In 2021, along with other artists like Ben Sims, Oscar Mulero, and Marcel Dettmann, she participated in PX099: 100 Years Of Colombia: a techno compilation with tracks from the artists on the scene with the intention of raising awareness about Colombia's social unrest.

In 2023, Jean-Michel Jarre collaborated with Kraviz on the remake of his Sex in the Machine Take 2 remake.

== Discography ==
=== Albums ===
- Nina Kraviz (Rekids, 2012)
- Cyberpunk 2077: Radio, Vol. 4 (Original Soundtrack) (2021)

==== Remix albums ====
- The Remixes (Rekids, 2012)

=== Extended plays ===
- First Time EP (2009)
- Ghetto Kraviz (Rekids, 2011)
- Mr Jones (Rekids, 2013)
- stranno stranno. neobjatno. (trip, 2019)

=== DJ mixes ===
- DJ-Kicks (#48) (2015)
- fabric 91 (2016)

=== Singles ===
- "Voices" (2009)
- "Pain in the Ass" (Rekids, 2009)
- "Hotter Than July" (2009)
- "I'm Week" (Rekids, 2010)
- "Moses" (vs. Sascha Funke; 2010)
- "Zlobnii Mikrob" (2010)
- "The Loop" (2010)
- "Aus" (2012)
- "Choices" (2012)
- "Taxi Talk" (2012)
- "Let's Do It" (trip, 2015)
- "Don't Mind Wrong Keys" (trip, 2015)
- "Pochuvstvui" (trip, 2017)
- "You Take" (trip, 2017)
- "Opa" (trip, 2018)
- "Hi Josh" (trip, 2018)
- "This Time" (2021)
- "Skyscrapers" (2021)
- "Hace ejercicios" (trip, 2022)
- "Tarde" (2023)
- "white horse" ft. Indira Paganotto (2023)
- "Bailando" ft.David Löhlein (2023)

=== Remixes ===
- St. Vincent — "New York" (Nina Kraviz Vocal Remix) (2019)
- Jean-Michel Jarre - "Sex in the Machine Take 2" (2023)

== Awards and nominations ==
DJ Awards

Year	Nominee / Work	Category	Result	Ref.
2015	Techno Award	—N/a	Nominated	

DJ Magazine's top 100 DJs

Year	Position	Notes	Ref.
2018	97	New Entry	
2019	60	Up 37	
2020	66	Down 6	
2021	54	Up 12	

International Dance Music Awards

Year	Category	Nominee / Work	Result	Ref.
2018	Best Female Artist (Underground)	—N/a	Won	
2019	Best Techno Artist (Female)	—N/a	Nominated	
2020	Best Techno Artist (Female)	—N/a	Nominated	

== Controversies ==
Nina Kraviz became embroiled in controversy following the Russian invasion of Ukraine due to her perceived silence and past statements regarding Russian politics. Critics, including Ukrainian DJ Nastia and Russian DJ Buttechno, accused Kraviz of failing to condemn the war and questioned her previous comments about Vladimir Putin. For example, in April 2014, shortly after Russia's annexation of Crimea, she posted an Instagram photo holding a cut-out of Putin with a gun featuring a flower in the barrel. Nina Kraviz's response—a social media post simply stating "peace"—was deemed insufficient by many, leading to calls for her to clarify her stance on the conflict.

The backlash intensified when Clone Distribution, a Rotterdam-based music distributor, severed ties with Kraviz's label, Trip Recordings, citing ethical and moral disagreements. Furthermore, she was dropped from the lineups of major festivals, including Movement in Detroit, The Crave in The Hague, and PollerWiesen in Germany. These actions highlighted growing demands for artists to take clear political positions about the war.

In May 2022, Kraviz responded publicly, expressing her distress about the war and opposing violence while asserting her identity as a musician rather than a political figure and pointing out her lack of competence to speak on political matters.
