= All You Need =

Single by Miss Kittin
- Released: 10 January 2011
- Recorded: 2010
- Genre: Electroclash, synthpop, tech house
- Label: Mobilee
- Songwriter: Caroline Hervé
- Producer: Caroline Hervé

Miss Kittin singles chronology
"Party in My Head" (2009)	"All You Need" (2011)

"All You Need" is a song by French singer and DJ Miss Kittin. Remixed by Lee Van Dowski and Gesaffelstein, it was released as a single on 10 January 2011.

== Composition ==
"All You Need" is credited as a tech house song with synthpop and electroclash influences, and is influenced by the analogue synth vocals of Gary Numan, and Pantha du Prince.

== Critical reception ==
DJ Magazine commented, "Old school to the core, this throbs and pulses with a deep electro bassline, Herve's angelic vocal in stark contrast to the darkness underpinning it. Lee Van Dowski takes things darker still for the 8am crowd, while Gesaffelstein from Paris forgets his manners by surpassing the original with six-and-a-half minutes of perfection. How rude." Jeff Timoney from Ibiza-Voice noted, "In many ways, it hits the spot perfectly - weird enough to be interesting....pop enough to be a guilty pleasure." Sascha Kösch from German magazine Debug described the song as "simple beats, simple bass line, a little over enthusiastic, yet the track comes back to an unexpected house sound, which gives the piece a distinctive classical sound." Johnny Loftus from The Village Voice opined, "the French DJ still has charisma like a carpenter has nails, and might even find another gear in this Gaga-fied era of fembot dancefloor operators who seduce with attitude and electro break amplification. In short, Kittin never got declawed."

== Cultural impact ==
In 2011, the song was featured on the compilation album Switch 17 by PIAS, which charted at number three on the Belgian Compilation Albums Chart (Flanders).

== Track listing ==
- Digital download
1. "All You Need" (Original) - 7:37
2. "All You Need" (Lee Van Dowski Remix) - 7:45
3. "All You Need" (Gesaffelstein Remix) - 6:28
- German Vinyl, 12-inch single
1. "All You Need" (Original) - 7:37
2. "All You Need" (Lee Van Dowski Remix) - 7:45

== Release history ==
Region	Date	Format	Label
Germany	10 January 2011	Vinyl, 12-inch single	Mobilee
United States	10 January 2011	Digital download	Mobilee
United States	1 February 2011	EP	Mobilee
