= John Roberts (electronic musician) =

American electronic musician

- Also known as: Body Four
- Born: Cleveland, Ohio, United States
- Genres: Electronic; Experimental
- Years active: 2008–present
- Labels: Dial Records; Brunette Editions
- Website: www.brunette-editions.com

John Roberts is an American record producer and electronic musician. He rose to critical acclaim with his debut album Glass Eights in 2010 and his follow-up album Fences, both released by Dial Records.

In 2009, Roberts co-founded the contemporary culture magazine, The Travel Almanac, with fellow musician Paul Kominek. In 2015, he started his own label, Brunette Editions. In 2017, he released a self-titled album under the alias Body Four.

Roberts currently resides in Los Angeles.

== Discography ==
=== As John Roberts ===
==== Studio albums ====
- Glass Eights (2010)
- Fences (2013)
- Plum (2016)
- Can Thought Exist Without The Body (2019)
- Wrecked Exotic (2022)
- Swan (2024)
- Regarding Film (2025)

=== As Body Four ===
==== Studio albums ====
- Body Four (2017)
