= Dream, Tiresias! =

Studio album by Project Pitchfork
- Released: February 27, 2009
- Genre: Electro-industrial, Synthpop
- Label: Trisol Music Group, Candyland Entertainment, Prussia Records
- Producer: Peter Spilles

Project Pitchfork chronology
Kaskade (2005)	Dream, Tiresias! (2009)

Singles from Dream, Tiresias!
- 1. "Feel!"

Dream, Tiresias! is a 2009 album by the German Electro-industrial act Project Pitchfork. It is their 11th studio album and was released in multiple formats, including a double-disc limited version. The song "Feel!" was released as a single to promote the album.

== Track listing ==
1. "If I Could" – 5:53
2. "Nasty Habit" – 5:49
3. "The Tide" – 5:54
4. "Promises" – 6:16
5. "An End" – 5:21
6. "Your God" – 5:32
7. "Feel!" – 6:46
8. "Full Of Life" – 5:38
9. "Darkness" – 5:31
10. "Passion" – 7:52
11. "Feel! ([:SITD:] Remix)"* – 4:36
12. "Feel! (Remixed By Noisuf-X)"* – 5:35
13. "Feel! (Die Krupps Remix)"* – 5:57

* = Bonus track on Trisol editions of the album

=== Limited Edition Bonus Disc ===
1. "Despise" – 3:54
2. "One Million Faces" (RMX) – 7:30
3. "Last Dream" – 4:38

== Trivia ==
- Each song on the main disc, excluding the bonus tracks, is followed by a short interlude referred to in the liner notes as "dreams"
- "One Million Faces (RMX)" is a remix of a song off their "Wonderland/One Million Faces" EP
