= Conference of Trees =

Studio album by Pantha du Prince
- Released: 6 March 2020
- Length: 1:14:28
- Label: Modern

Pantha du Prince chronology
The Triad (2016)	Conference of Trees (2020)	Garden Gaia (2022)

Professional ratings
Aggregate scores
Source	Rating
AnyDecentMusic?	7.4/10
Metacritic	80/100
Review scores
Source	Rating
AllMusic	4/5 stars
Exclaim!	8/10
Pitchfork	7.1/10

Conference of Trees is a studio album by German musician and producer Pantha du Prince. It was released on 6 March 2020 under Modern Records.

The first single "Pius in Tacet" was released on 8 February 2020.

== Critical reception ==
Conference of Trees was met with generally favorable reviews from critics. At Metacritic, which assigns a weighted average rating out of 100 to reviews from mainstream publications, this release received an average score of 80, based on 6 reviews.

== Track listing ==
Conference of Trees track listing
No.	Title	Length
1.	"Approach in a Breeze"	10:46
2.	"Transparent Tickle Shining Glace"	5:58
3.	"Holding the Oak"	3:42
4.	"When We Talk"	6:21
5.	"Roots Making Family"	5:48
6.	"The Crown Territory"	5:50
7.	"Supernova Space Time Drift"	11:11
8.	"Silentium Larix"	7:13
9.	"Pius in Tacet"	5:39
10.	"Lichtung"	12:00
