= Maria Chavez =

Maria Chavez is an improviser, curator and sound artist born 1980 in Lima, Peru. Her family moved to Texas when she was two years old. The following year doctors found and released liquid in her ears alleviating what had been a serious impediment to her speech and hearing. By age 16 she began working with sound and turntables. Her sound installations, visual objects and live turntable performances focus on the values of the accident and its unique, complicated possibilities with sound emitting machinery like the turntable. Influenced by improvisation in contemporary art, her work extends outside of the sound world to straddle varied disciplines of interest. The sound installations and live turntable performances of Maria Chavez focus on the paradox of time and the present moment, with many influences stemming from improvisation in contemporary art.

== Awards ==
She was awarded the Jerome Foundation’s Emerging Artist Grant by New York City’s Roulette Intermedium in 2008, and in 2009 she became a recipient of the Van Lier Fellowship by The Edward and Sally Van Lier Fund of The New York Community Trust.

== Work ==
For her experimental turntablism, Chavez uses new and broken needles (the latter of which she refers to as 'perfect to ruin' needles), on a collection of vinyl she uses to build a sound palette. Chavez's compositions are created for specific locations, and their acoustic characteristics allow for the ambiguity of reverberation, reflection, and refraction to enter into each composition.

Maria was an artist in residence with the Merce Cunningham Dance Company, the Clocktower and the Dia:Beacon Museum. Chavez has also been an artist in residence at Issue Project Room, and played in Christian Marclay's Screenplay at the Whitney Museum in 2010.

In 2012, Chavez published her first book Of Technique: Chance Procedures on Turntable, which she wrote and illustrated herself. The book serves as a how-to manual for those interested in learning the abstract turntablism techniques that she developed with the turntable. This book is considered the first sound related release by Chavez since her solo album release in 2004. In 2019 the Macro label released an album by Chavez based on treatments of the empty locked grooves of a vinyl record by Stefan Goldmann.

== Collaborations ==
She has worked with Christian Marclay and the Whitney Museum of American Art in NYC as part of Christian Marclay: FESTIVAL, has shared the stage with renowned artists such as Pauline Oliveros, Thurston Moore, Phill Niblock and Otomo Yoshihide, and has toured with Christina Carter. She has also collaborated with fellow turntablists Otomo Yoshihide, dieb13, and eRikm as part of the Wien Modern festival of contemporary music in Vienna.

== Personal life ==
Maria Chavez encountered Pauline Oliveros in Houston, their shared home city, as part of a group of young improvisers aged 17-26. Chavez performed her first solo turntable performance in Oliveros' mother Edith's piano studio in the house Oliveros grew up in. Chavez would eventually form a friendship and mentorship with Oliveros.
