= Aurora Sutra =

German dark wave band

- Origin: Hamburg, Germany
- Genres: Neoclassical dark wave, gothic rock
- Years active: 1993–1998
- Labels: Sound Factory, Talitha
- Past members: Patricia Nigiani; Peter Spilles
- Website: aurora-sutra.com

Aurora Sutra was a German dark wave band that was formed in Hamburg by Patricia Nigiani and Peter Spilles, both members of Project Pitchfork. They began recording under the name Aurora, but added the "Sutra" after the release of their debut The Land of Harm and Appletrees in 1993.

== History ==
Vocalist Patricia Nigiani and keyboardist Peter Spilles began recording under the name Aurora in 1993 as a side project to Project Pitchfork. Their debut The Land of Harm and Appletrees was released in 1993 and the band added "Sutra" to their name afterward. Their music was compared to Dead Can Dance and Modest Mussorgsky, especially his composition The Nursery. In 1994, the band followed with their second album The Dimension Gate by Talitha, marking their second and final release for the label. Conceptually the album's music is about being faced with the ultimate question of life after the evolution of man and rebirth of the universe. The album was also released with bonus tracks, four compositions celebrating the elementals air, earth, fire and water.

In 1995, Peter Spilles returned his focus to Project Pitchfork, with Patricia Nigiani assuming creative control of the Aurora's musical project. During this time, she recorded as part of the electronic band Sun God and released their 1995 self-titled debut album on Fifth Colvmn and Original Artists Group. In 1996, she released the band's third album Passing Over in Silence Towards Nuit, which was produced by Rodney Orpheus of The Cassandra Complex. Auro Sutra released their fourth studio album I and I Shall Descend in 1998 on Sound Factory.

== Discography ==
Studio albums

- As Aurora: The Land of Harm and Appletrees (1993, Talitha)
- The Dimension Gate (1994, Talitha)
- Passing Over in Silence Towards Nuit (1996, Sound Factory)
- I and I Shall Descend (1998, Sound Factory)
