= Sun God (album) =

Studio album by Sun God
- Released: May 22, 1995
- Genre: Electronic; ambient
- Length: 68:59
- Label: Fifth Colvmn/Original Artists
- Producer: Marcus Giltjes; Patricia Nigiani; Rodney Orpheus

Alternative cover
- German issue

Sun God is the debut studio album by Sun God, released on May 22, 1995, by Fifth Colvmn Records and Original Artists Group.

== Music ==
The songs "Ayizan" and "Guede" from Sun God were released on the various artists compilations Life Is Too Short for Boring Music Volume VII and Forced Cranial Removal by EFA and Fifth Colvmn Records. In 1996 the track "Guede", also from the band's debut, was released on Living for Music 2 by Discordia.

== Reception ==
Professional ratings
Review scores
Source	Rating
AllMusic	3/5 stars

John Bush of AllMusic awarded Sun God three out of five stars, calling it an "album of tribal rhythms and percussion" with "Nigiani's airy vocals and Orpheus's sinister growls complementing each other well." Sonic Boom described it as "a modern day interpretation of what many of the early pagan magick ceremonies might have been in the middle ages" and that "the music inspires meditation, celebration and escape from the constraints of society on its listeners."

== Track listing ==
All tracks are written by Marcus Giltjes, Patricia Nigiani and Rodney Orpheus

No.	Title	Length
1.	"Legba"	8:39
2.	"Oya"	5:19
3.	"Ayizan"	5:25
4.	"Damballah & Ayida Wedo"	5:16
5.	"Simbi"	8:34
6.	"Guede"	6:56
7.	"Agwe"	8:07
8.	"Gran Ibo"	7:34
9.	"Erzulie"	4:50
10.	"The Ancestors"	8:20

== Personnel ==
Adapted from the Sun God liner notes.

Sun God

- Marcus Giltjes – instruments, production
- Patricia Nigiani – vocals, instruments, production
- Rodney Orpheus – vocals, instruments, production

Additional performers

- Emily Brayshaw – viola
- Tom Crowe – Gnostic chanting
- Carolina Gross – flute

Production and design

- Axel Ermes – assistant production
- Jürgen Jansen – assistant production

== Release history ==
Region	Date	Label	Format	Catalog
United States	1995	Fifth Colvmn	CD	9868-63192
Germany	1995	Original Artists Group	CD	EFA 01351
