= Daimonion (band) =

Polish rock band

- Origin: Piotrków Trybunalski, Poland
- Genres: Alternative rock, gothic rock
- Years active: 1994–present
- Label: Love Industry (Poland)
- Members: Marcin Tymanowski - vocal Marcin Gliszczyński - guitar Tomasz Stelmaszek - guitar Adrian Tymanowski - bass Daniel Kruz - drums
- Website: www.daimonion.republika.pl

Daimonion are a Polish band from Piotrków Trybunalski established in 1994. They play an energetic, colourful and spatial variety of atmospheric rock, rooted somewhere in the gothic scene of the 1980s and 1990s. The musical formula of the group is constantly enriched with elements characteristic of such genres as trance, ambient, post rock or shoegaze.

They have released several demo and promo tapes and CDs as well as one full-length studio album: Daimonion (Love Industry, 2007). Their tracks have been released in compilations including Castle Party Compilation 2001 and In Goth We Trust DVD medley (Metal Mind Productions 2003) issued to show an overview of the Polish dark and goth scene.

Daimonion have played many concerts in Poland, including major events and festivals: Jarocin Festival (Jarocin 1994), Castle Party (Grodziec 1994, 1995, 1996, Bolków 1998, 2001), Dark East Music Meeting (Warsaw 2005), supporting Fields of the Nephilim (Warsaw 2008), Love Like Blood and Breath of Life (Kraków 1995) and developed a moderate following. Their visits abroad include playing at two editions of the Dark Nation Day Festival in Vienna (2001) and the Lithuanian Creeper Fest (Vilnius 2008).

== Discography ==
- Daimonion (Love Industry, 2007)
