= KiNK =

Bulgarian producer, DJ and live performer

Strahil Velchev, better known by his artist name KiNK, is a Bulgarian producer, DJ and live performer.

Velchev became interested in electronic music in the 1990s and started making his own music a few years later. In 2005, he released his track, "Same Old Thing", on vinyl. He has worked with multiple record labels, including Ovum and Rush Hour. In May 2014, his debut album Under Destruction was released with Macro. His second album, Playground, was released with Running Back in November 2017. In 2018, he launched his own label, named after his hometown Sofia.

In his live performances, KiNK is known for improvisation and interaction with the audience. According to a poll, Resident Advisor readers named him the Best Live Electronic Act of 2015 and 2016. In 2018, MusicRadar named him the best live electronic act in the world.

KiNK also releases music under the alias Kirilik and with his partner Rachel Row.
