= Sun God (band) =

European electronic-music group

- Origin: Germany
- Genres: Electronic; ambient
- Years active: 1994–2020
- Labels: Fifth Colvmn; Original Artists
- Members: Rodney Orpheus
- Past members: Marcus Giltjes; Patricia Nigiani
- Website: rodneyorpheus.com/sun-god/

Sun God were a European electronic music group comprising musicians Rodney Orpheus, Marcus Giltjes, and Patricia Nigiani. The band released one studio album titled Sun God in 1995 for Fifth Colvmn Records and Original Artists Group.

== History ==
Sun God was formed in Hamburg by musician Rodney Orpheus, working with Marcus Giltjes and Patricia Nigiani. Orpheus is a member of The Cassandra Complex and Nigiani was previously in the band Pitchfork . Orpheus met Jared Louche, of the band Chemlab, who connected the band with Fifth Colvmn Records.

In May 1995 Sun God released their debut full-length studio album Sun God on Fifth Colvmn and Original Artists Group. The album comprised music composed around Voudou and Santeria rituals. The songs "Ayizan" and "Guede" from their debut were released on the various artist compilations Life Is Too Short for Boring Music Volume VII and Forced Cranial Removal by EFA and Fifth Colvmn Records. The following year the track "Guede", also from the band's debut, was released on Living for Music 2 by Discordia.

Rodney Orpheus went on to become a touring member of The Sisters of Mercy.

== Discography ==
Studio albums

- Sun God (1995, Fifth Colvmn/Original Artists Group)

Compilation appearances

- Forced Cranial Removal (1995 Fifth Colvmn)
- Life Is Too Short for Boring Music Volume VII (1995 EFA)
- Living for Music 2 (1996, Discordia)
