= I and I Shall Descend =

Studio album by Aurora Sutra
- Released: March 30, 1998
- Studio: Barner Beach Studios (Hamburg-Altona, Germany)
- Genre: Dark wave; electronic; new age
- Length: 64:10
- Label: Talitha
- Producer: Axel Ermes; Hauke Harms; Carsten Klatte; Patricia Nigiani

Aurora Sutra chronology
| Passing Over in Silence Towards Nuit (1996) | I and I Shall Descend (1998) |

I and I Shall Descend is the fourth studio album by Aurora Sutra, released on March 30, 1998, by Sound Factory.

== Track listing ==
| No. | Title | Lyrics | Music | Length |
|---|---|---|---|---|
| 1. | "One in All and All in One, Which Is Naught" | Patricia Nigiani | Carsten Klatte; Patricia Nigiani | 7:11 |
| 2. | "Consecrated Lover" | Carsten Klatte; Patricia Nigiani | Klatte; Nigiani; Friedrich Paravicini | 6:35 |
| 3. | "Snake Dance" | Nigiani | Klatte; Paravicini | 6:36 |
| 4. | "Goddess Shape-Shifting" | Nigiani | Klatte; Nigiani | 7:15 |
| 5. | "Weaving the Dream" | Nigiani | Klatte | 8:26 |
| 6. | "Evocation of the Holy Couple" | Nigiani | Nigiani | 4:00 |
| 7. | "Invocation of my Demon Sister" | Klatte | Klatte | 3:19 |
| 8. | "The Threefolded Mystery" | Nigiani | Klatte; Paravicini | 7:21 |
| 9. | "Alegoria pagana" | Klatte; Nigiani | Klatte | 5:55 |
| 10. | "The Quintessence" | Nigiani | Klatte | 7:32 |

== Personnel ==
Adapted from I and I Shall Descend liner notes.

Aurora Sutra

- Carsten Klatte (as Lacasa Del Cid) – programming, production, vocals (1, 2, 7), double bass (1, 4, 8), tom tom (1, 4, 9), electric guitar (1, 5), bagpipes (2, 4), shakers (3, 5), acoustic guitar (4, 5), tambourine (5, 9), keyboards (5, 10), chanter (3), sitar (3), tabla (3), gong (3), EBow (5), djembe (5), tin whistle (8) Saz (9), Bongos (9), Cymbal (9), electric guitar (10), piano (10)
- Patricia Nigiani – lead vocals, production
- Friedrich Paravicini – violoncello (2, 8), double bass (2)

Production and design

- Axel Ermes – production, bells (10)
- Marcus Eschke – photography
- Ralf Fleischhauer – mastering
- Hauke Harms – production
- Ulrike Rank – design

== Release history ==
| Region | Date | Label | Format | Catalog |
|---|---|---|---|---|
| Germany | 1998 | Sound Factory | CD | 35900432 (42) |
