= Matt Tolfrey =

English DJ, producer and label owner (1980–2025)

- Also known as: Out-ed
- Born: Matthew Len Tolfrey; October 1980; Isle of Wight, England
- Died: October 2025 (aged 44)
- Genres: Electronic music
- Occupation(s): Producer, DJ, label owner
- Years active: 2001–2025
- Labels: Leftroom Records, Leftroom Limited, Leftout, Is This
- Website: Matt Tolfrey Artist Profile

Matthew Len Tolfrey (October 1980 – October 2025) was an English DJ, producer and label owner. He owned and operated four labels: Leftroom, Leftroom Limited, Leftout, and Is This, and was named on Resident Advisor's Top 100 DJ Poll in 2011 and 2012.

== Life and career ==
Tolfrey was born in October 1980 on the Isle of Wight, but raised in Bahrain. He returned to the UK aged 16 and played in a bar in Worcester. He enrolled at Nottingham Trent University, where in his first year was given a show on Fly FM. His show Junk Funk won the station's best newcomer award and Tolfrey was promoted to head of night-time DJs.

Tolfrey gained popularity in the clubscene, progressing to perform at The Bomb, Stealth, and Fabric.

Wanting to be involved more in the other aspects of dance music, Tolfrey moved into production and released through Crosstown Rebels under the name "Out-ed". He formed his own record label, Leftroom, in 2005. Tolfrey sought a way to release his peers' music and open up opportunities for friends, and released The Extended Family EP. The label's first few releases were successful and Tolfrey was approached to start a label night at T Bar. Expanding on the idea of Leftroom, Tolfrey put started two imprints of Leftroom – Leftroom Limited (for releasing peak-time records) and Leftout (for lesser-known artists). Tolfrey's first full-length album, Word of Mouth, was released on Leftroom Records in 2012.

Tolfrey died in October 2025, at the age of 44.

== Discography ==
=== Albums ===
- 2012: Word of Mouth (Leftroom)

=== Compilations ===
- 2007: Don't Be Leftout (Leftroom)
- 2011: One (1Trax)
- 2012: Classic Through the Eyes of... Matt Tolfrey (Leftroom)

=== Original music ===
- 2005: "The Horn"/"Acix" with Craig Sylvester (Crosstown Rebels)
- 2006: "Popeye"/"Spinach Disko" with Craig Sylvester (Leftroom Limited)
- 2006: "Are We Family" (Leftroom)
- 2007: "Enter the Mad Hat" and "Shakil" with Inxec and Craig Sylvester (Leftroom Limited)
- 2008: "Misunderstood" with Glimpse (Glimpse Recordings)
- 2009: "Even in Hollywood" with Inxec (Culprit)
- 2009: "Decisions" with Inxec (Murmur)
- 2009: "Babygirl" with Marc Ashken (Saved)
- 2009: "Bounce for Me" with D. Ramirez (Phonica)
- 2009: "What Am I Buyin" with Delete (Viva)
- 2009: Mile 569 EP with Inxec (Murmur)
- 2009: "I Just Can't (Take It)" with Inxec (Cocoon)
- 2010: "Almost There" with Inxec (Rekids)
- 2010: "Hollywood Revisited" with Inxec (Culprit)
- 2010: "Real Talk" with Inxec (Murmur)
- 2011: "Drop the Bomb" with Lazaro Casanova (Get Physical)
- 2011: "Bring It On" with Inxec (Murmur)
- 2011: "In Excess" with Inxec (Leftroom Limited)
- 2011: "Hollywood @ Night" with Christopher Sylvester (1Trax)
- 2011: "Who's the Freak" (Get Physical)
- 2011: "Candy" with Lee Curtiss (Culprit)
- 2011: "Bromance" with Eric Johnston (Leftroom)
- 2012: The Same Page EP with Kate Simko (Leftroom)
- 2012: LAX EP with Lazaro Casanova, Nikko Gibler (Culprit)
- 2012: "Turn You Out" featuring Ya Kid K (Leftroom)

=== Remixes ===
- 2005: "Gehts Noch" with Craig Sylvester (Skint)
- 2005: "Bus Driver" with Craig Sylvester (Perc Trax)
- 2006: "Seal Clubbing" with Craig Sylvester (Renaissance)
- 2006: "Gone Long Gone" with Craig Sylvester (TCP)
- 2006: "Ken the Men" with Craig Sylvester" (Punch Funk)
- 2007: "Alcoolic" with Inxec (CR2)
- 2007: "Tewa" with Inxec (Ransom Note)
- 2007: "Shtootsh" with Marc Ashken (Frankie)
- 2007: "The Whole Room Dematerialised" with Inxec (Kismet)
- 2007: "You Aint Got Time to Think" with Inxec (Fourt:Twenty)
- 2008: "Crash This Car" with Marc Ashken (Leftroom)
- 2008: "Down Seq" with Inxec (Leftroom Limited)
- 2008: "X, Y and Z" with Marc Ashken (Leftroom Limited)
- 2008: "Escalator" with Inxec (NRK)
- 2008: "Let’s Take Drugs" with Inxec (Yoshitoshi)
- 2009: "Really Luv Ya" with Inxec (Get Physical)
- 2009: "Wider Pro" with Marc Ashken (MagicBag)
- 2009: "Nice One" with Inxec (Bla Bla)
- 2009: "One More Tune" with Inxec (Renaissance)
- 2009: "Pins n Needles" with Inxec (Fondation)
- 2009: "Quantum" with Inxec (Sound of Acapulco)
- 2010: "Frankfurt" with Inxec (Metroline Limited)
- 2010: "Mirrors" with Inxec (Wiggle)
- 2012: "Elastik Phone with Sam Russo" (Underbelly Records)
- 2012: "Confetti with Sam Russo" (1Trax)
- 2012: "Street Talk with Sam Russo" (Off Recordings)
- 2012: "Classic Through the Eyes of.. Matt Tolfrey" (Classic Music Company)
- 2012: "Right On, Right On" (Soma)
- 2012: "Intentions" with Sam Russo (Leftroom)

== See also ==
- Artist Profile
