= Josh Wink =

American electronic music DJ and remixer (born 1970)

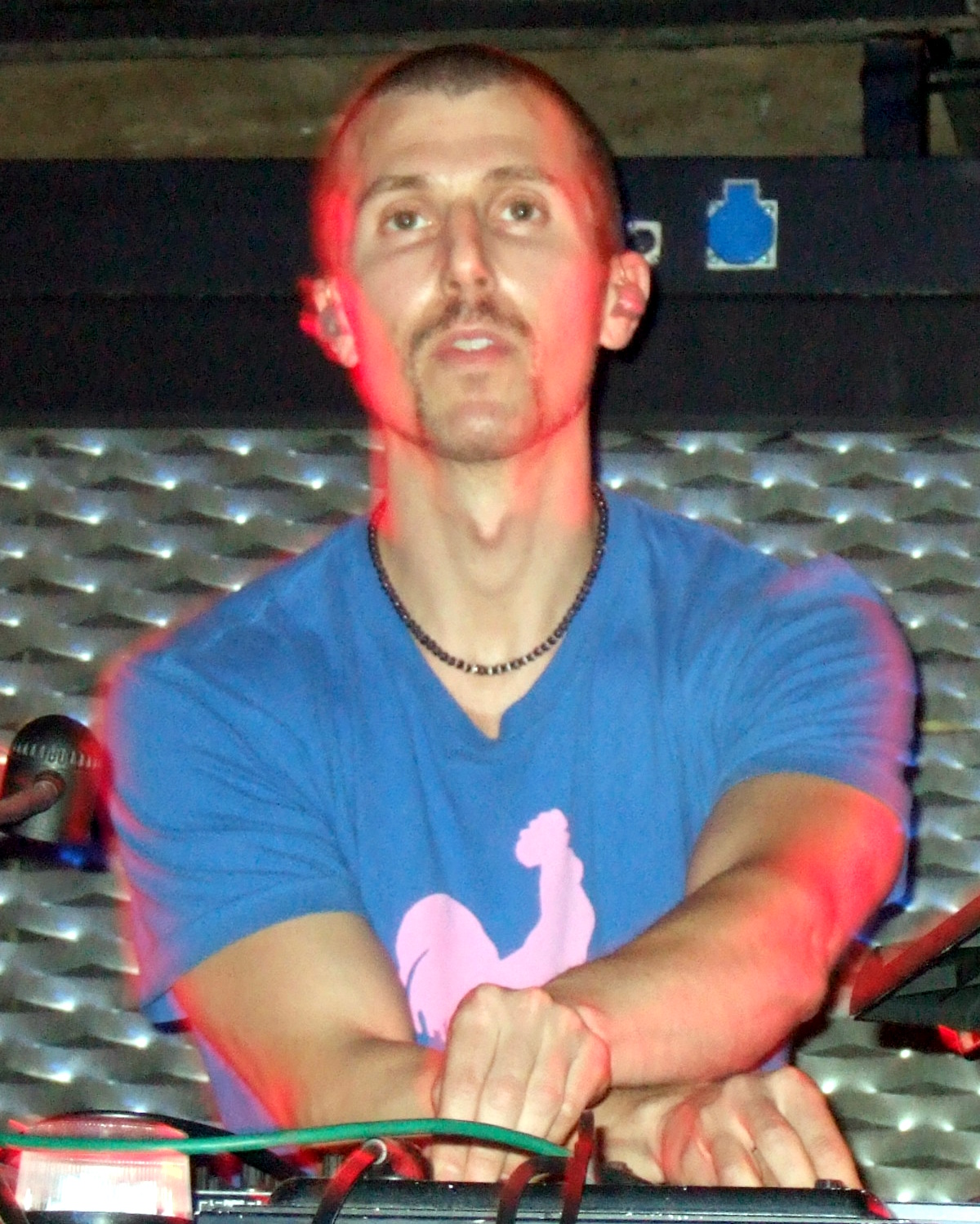
- Josh Wink performing live (13 May 2007)

Background information
- Also known as: Accent, The Crusher, Dinky Dog, Size 9, Wink, Winx
- Born: Joshua Winkelman; April 20, 1970 (age 56); Philadelphia, Pennsylvania, U.S.
- Genres: Big beat; electronic; acid house; drum and bass; breakbeat
- Occupations: DJ, producer, label owner
- Years active: 1990–present
- Label: Ovum Recordings
- Website: Josh Wink.com & Elite Music Management

Joshua Winkelman (born April 20, 1970), better known by his stage name Josh Wink, is an American electronic dance music DJ, label owner, producer and remixer. He is a native of Philadelphia, Pennsylvania. A pioneering DJ in the American rave scene during the early 1990s, Wink was the most prominent exponent of the tribal forms of techno and house in the U.S. In 1995, he released several hits, including "Don't Laugh" (as Winx), "I'm Ready" (as Size 9) (which hit number one on the U.S. Hot Dance Club Play chart), and "Higher State of Consciousness," which topped the dance charts in Europe. He has had many club hits such as "How's Your Evening So Far?" (samples Lil Louis's "French Kiss") (and for which he gave Lil Louis 100% writing / publishing credit) and "Superfreak (Freak)" and has also gained much attention for his remixes of Stabbing Westward, FC Kahuna, Paul Oakenfold, Moby, Towa Tei, Ladytron and Depeche Mode, among others.

== Early life ==
As a youth, Wink studied the piano for three years and took clarinet lessons as a teenager. His interest in DJing began as a 13-year-old, when he became apprentice to a friend, a radio station and mobile DJ in Philadelphia. It was at this time that Wink also became a vegetarian, following in the footsteps of his mother and brother. As a teen, he taught himself how to mix beats. By 1988, Wink had met fellow DJ King Britt, and the two began creating original tracks together. After he turned 18, he started working as a DJ in nightclubs.

== Style ==
Wink's style is a mixture of breakbeat, acid house, drum and bass, and experimental music. In interviews, he has stated that his music is "built around tension", and that his work is often influenced by "mistake theory, which is: I use a lot of things that you and I might consider mistakes....by (experimenting) with effects, with filters, with percentages in my sampler, and just doing stuff that you wouldn't ordinarily do."

In 1996, Rolling Stone writer Frank Broughton observed that "a Josh Wink record takes a series of sampled noises, then twists and warps them through a barrage of sound processors, resulting in a spiraling blend of acidic bass lines and trippy break beats." Kerri Mason of Billboard referred to Wink's Profound Sounds album series as "sensual techno, rendered as a whole composition rather than a collection of individual, flavor-of-the-month tracks."

Wink has mentioned influences including the German electronic band Kraftwerk; British electronic groups like Depeche Mode, OMD and Section 25; early hip-hop; and late-1980s Chicago house music. He is a strong supporter of new DJing technology, most specifically utilising, demonstrating and advocating the Final Scratch application.

== Recordings ==
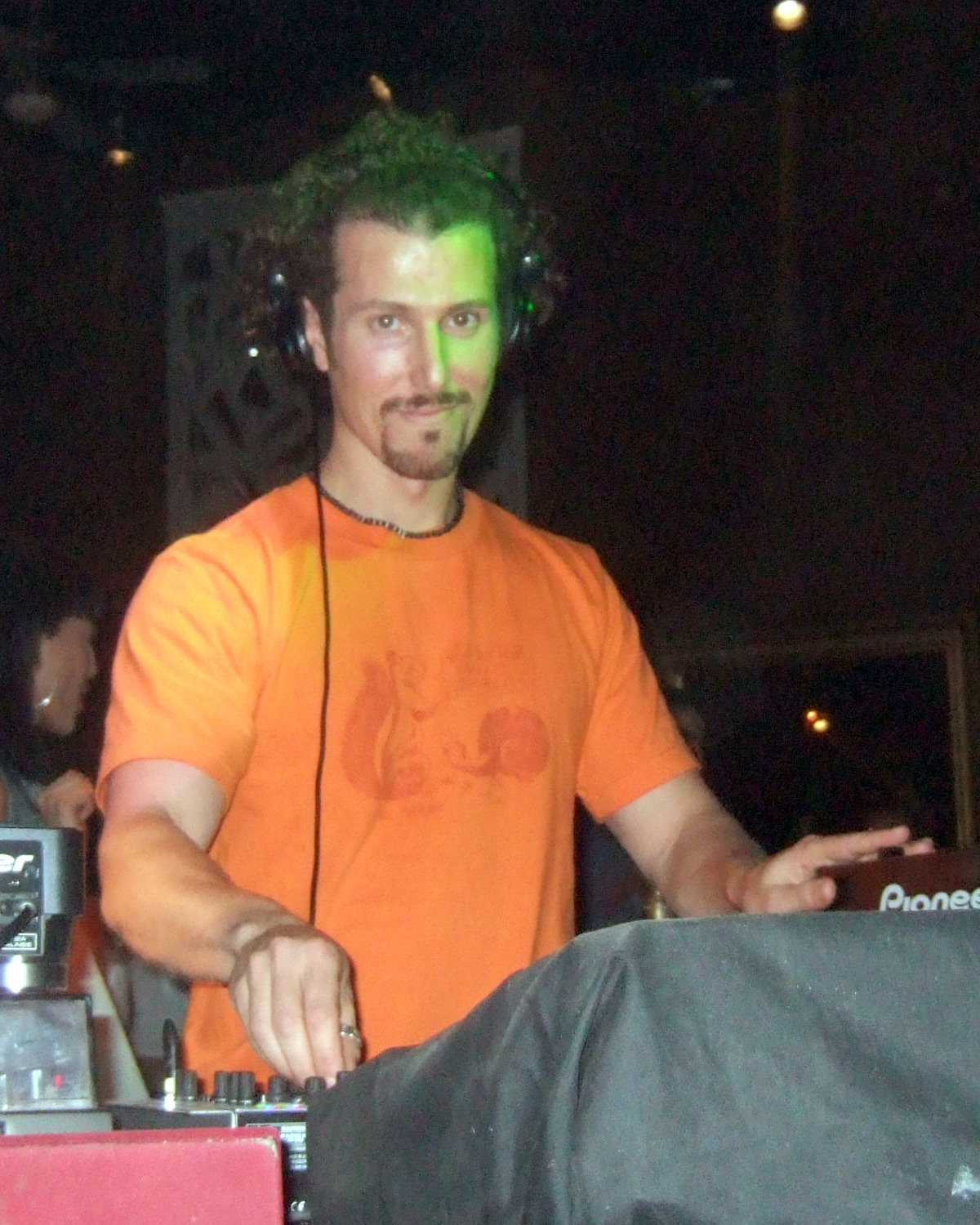
Josh Wink performing live (10 February 2006)

In 1994, Wink founded his own record label called Ovum Recordings with King Britt. He also has worked with poet Ursula Rucker and Trent Reznor of Nine Inch Nails. All of the below albums were released on his Ovum imprint with the exception of the first two. Josh Wink has also recorded some releases as Wink, Winc, Winks, Winx, The Crusher, E-Culture and Size 9.

=== Artist albums ===
- A Higher State of Wink's Work (1996, Manifesto) – compilation of Wink's early 12-inch singles
- Left Above the Clouds (1996, Nervous/XL)
- Herehear (1998, Ovum)
- 20 to 20 (2003, Ovum)
- When a Banana Was Just a Banana (2009, Ovum)
- When a Banana Was Just a Banana (Remixed & Peeled) (2010, Ovum)

In addition to his artist albums, Wink has released many DJ mix albums, three of his most well known being Volumes 1, 2 and 3 of the Profound Sounds series. Profound Sounds Volume 3 is notable in that it contains Wink's popular remix of the Radiohead song "Everything in Its Right Place", which despite becoming a favorite of DJs as a bootlegged mp3, Wink was able to license exclusively for his album through negotiations with Radiohead along with their management and publisher.

In December 2010, a remix by Josh Wink of "On Melancholy Hill" by Gorillaz was revealed to those who had completed an internet scavenger hunt.

In celebration of Ovum Recordings' 25th birthday, Josh Wink released "Aries In Mars" on December 14, 2018, which serves as the label's 300th track.

== Personal life ==
Wink pursues a vegan lifestyle.
