= Lee Van Dowski =

French electronic music artist

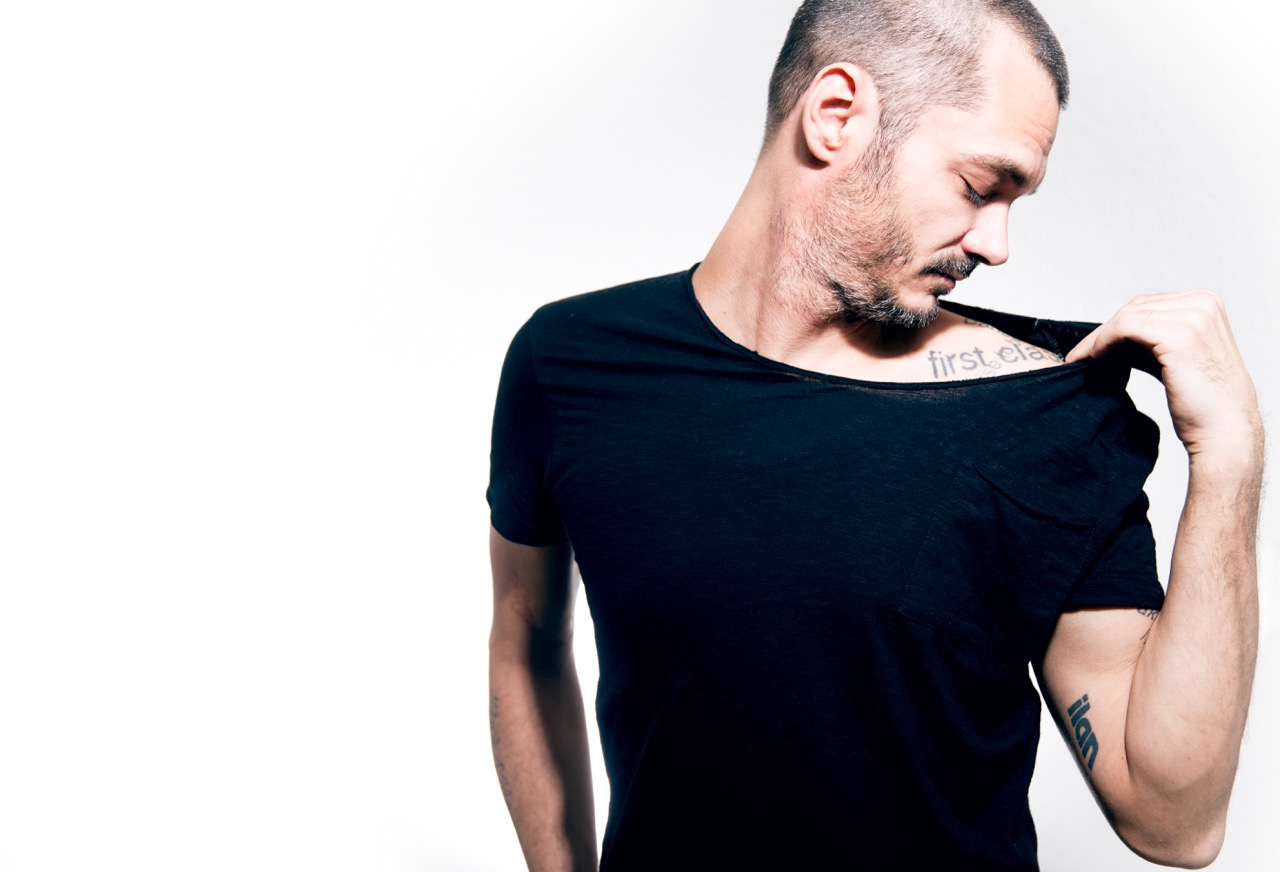
Birth Name: Renaud Lewandowski Location: Zurich, Switzerland Le nom est un emprunt à Herbert Lewandowski Herbert Lewandowski (* 23. März 1896 in Cassel; † 4. März 1996 in Genf; Pseudonyme: C. M. H. Léwan-Dovski, Herbert C. M. Lewandowski, Lee Van Dovski, Lee van Dowski, Kaspar Hauser, Emmy Grant) war ein deutscher Schriftsteller und Pionier der Sexualwissenschaft. Genres: Techno, Tech/House, House, Electronica, Ambient Labels : Mobilee Records, Cocoon, Suara, Bedrock, Snatch!, Rebellion, Noir, Rekids, Cadenza, Bpitch Control, This And That, Wagon Repair, Leena, Material, Num, Dumb Unit, Soma, Voltage Musique, etc...

Lee Van Dowski is a pseudonym for Renaud Lewandowski, a French electronic music artist who moved to Geneva in 2000.

== Discography ==
Albums

- A Lego Element (2003)
- Highway to Xenia (2005)

Remixes

- Miss Kittin - ("All You Need") (2011)
