= Daimonion (Project Pitchfork album) =

Studio album by Project Pitchfork
- Released: February 26, 2001
- Recorded: "Candyland Studios Hamburg" and "The Hall of Light", 2000/2001
- Genre: Electro-industrial, synthpop
- Label: EastWest Records
- Producer: Jürgen Jansen, Peter Spilles

Project Pitchfork chronology
Eon:Eon (1998)	Daimonion (2001)	Inferno (2002)

Singles from Daimonion
- 1. "Existence"; 2. "Timekiller"

Daimonion is the 8th studio album by the German electronic music group Project Pitchfork. It was released on February 26, 2001 through EastWest Records. The album reached number eight on the German album charts and number two on the CMJ RPM Charts in the U.S., making it the most commercially successful Project Pitchfork album to date. Two songs from the album were released as singles: "Existence" and "Timekiller".

== Track listing ==
1. "Daimonion (You Hear Me In Your Dreams)" – 4:55
2. "Timekiller" – 4:23
3. "Sand-Glass" – 4:28
4. "Jupiter (Or Somewhere Out There)" – 5:56
5. "We Are One (Mirror Split Up Into Pieces)" – 5:38
6. "The Clone" – 4:18
7. "Fear" – 4:23
8. "Drone Assembly" – 2:14
9. "Drone State" – 4:43
10. "Mine / Beast Of Prey" – 5:11
11. "Citynight" – 4:39
12. "Last Call" – 4:39
13. "Existence V.4.1" – 4:40
14. "The View" – 5:16
