= Pantha du Prince =

German musician

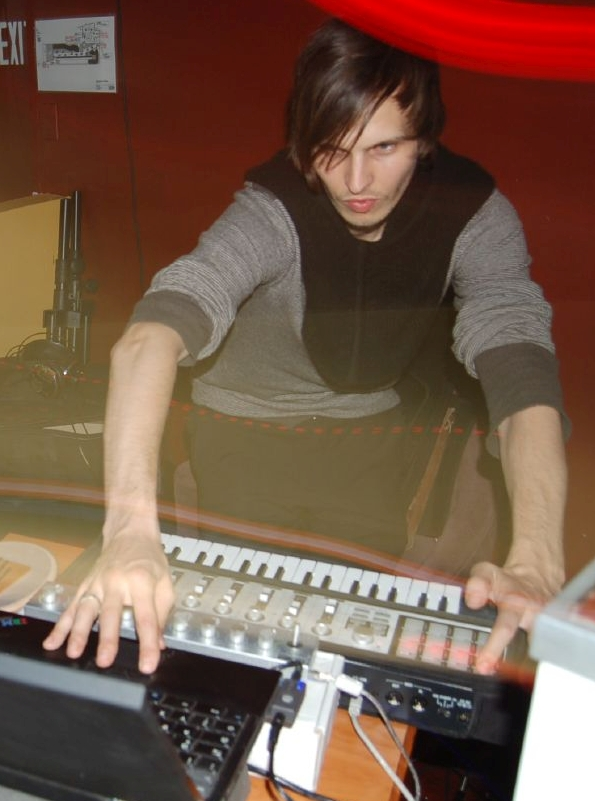
- Live at Rocket Bar, Boston on May 31, 2007

Background information
- Also known as: Panthel, Glühen 4
- Born: Hendrik Weber; 1975 (age 50–51); Bad Wildungen, West Germany
- Genres: Electronic; minimal techno; microhouse; dark ambient
- Years active: 2002–present
- Labels: Dial Records; Rough Trade
- Website: panthaduprince.com

Hendrik Weber (born 1975 in Bad Wildungen, Germany), better known as Pantha du Prince, Panthel, and Glühen 4 is a German producer, composer and conceptual artist for electro, techno, house, minimal, and noise, affiliated with Dial Records, and Rough Trade Records.

== Career ==
Weber's style evolved from the harder end of the house music spectrum and minimal techno to something he described himself as "sonic house," and incorporating acoustic elements, electronically altered field recordings, and shoegazing references. He launched his Pantha du Prince identity in 2002, with the four-track 12" "Nowhere". His first full-length album Diamond Daze (2004), featured hard-edged club songs, with samples of The Chills' "Pink Frost" on the track "Circle Glider". Writing for allmusic, Jason Birchmeier also detected an affinity for shoegaze bands such as My Bloody Valentine and Slowdive, as well as stylings of Detroit techno producer Carl Craig.

Weber's 2005 remix 12" "Butterfly Girl Versions" and the 2006 "Lichten/Walden" 12" were again published on the German label Dial. In 2007, Weber released This Bliss where he explored travel, time, and the joy of forward motion. Commenting on the album's juxtaposition of ethereal melodic elements and a dance music backbone, Tim Finney gave it 7.7 out of 10 in a review for Pitchfork. The New York Times critic Jon Caramanica described This Bliss as Pantha du Prince's "high-water mark, [and] a pensive, slender and tough album".

In 2010, Weber switched to Rough Trade Records before releasing his third album Black Noise, where he sought to "incorporate a wide range of sounds — field recordings, atonal noise, and stray percussion," as part of a "period of musical exploration in the Swiss Alps." Unlike a totalizing experience of This Bliss, some saw tracks on Black Noise as a more compartmentalized treatment of moods and textures that retained Weber's "gift for generating heavily melodic mazes of sound." Featuring Animal Collective's Noah Lennox and LCD Soundsystem's Tyler Pope as guest artists, and following the aforementioned label change, Black Noise was met with more excitement than Weber's previous work.

In 2012, Pantha Du Prince collaborated with Stephan Abry of the band Workshop; the duo formed the project Ursprung (after an Austrian town), and released an album Ursprung on Dial. In 2013, Pantha du Prince and the Norwegian percussion five-piece The Bell Laboratory released their collaborative album Elements of Light. The ambitious project was a symphony for electronics, percussion and bell carillon, a three-tonne instrument comprising 50 bronze bells. When asked if there was anything he wanted listeners to take away from Elements of Light, Weber said, "It was intended to be listened to in one piece [...], more like a DJ mix."

Due to his integral approach, Pantha du Prince manages to unite different areas of cultural production including popular music, performance, and fine arts to one artform. Weber's installations coalesce sounds, architecture, and objects into a transcendental space.

== Discography ==
=== As Pantha du Prince ===
==== Albums ====
- 2004: Diamond Daze
- 2007: This Bliss
- 2010: Black Noise
- 2013: Elements of Light (with the Bell Laboratory)
- 2016: The Triad
- 2017: The Triad Remix Versions
- 2017: The Triad Ambient Versions
- 2020: Conference of Trees
- 2022: Garden Gaia

==== Singles/EPs ====
- 2002: "Nowhere"
- 2005: "Butterfly Girl Versions"
- 2006: "Lichten/Walden"
- 2009: "Behind the Stars"
- 2009: "The Splendour"
- 2010: "Stick to My Side"
- 2010: "Lay in a Shimmer"
- 2015: "The Winter Hymn"
- 2017: "Mondholz : Remixes & Canons" (with Arash Safaian)

==== Compilations ====
- 2011: XI Versions of Black Noise
- 2011: V Versions of Black Noise
- 2017: Coming Home

=== As Glühen 4 ===
==== Albums ====
- 2003: Das Schweigen der Sirenen

=== As Ursprung ===
==== Albums ====
- 2012: Ursprung

=== As Hendrik Weber ===
==== Albums ====
- 2021: 429 Hz Formen von Stille

== Selected exhibitions and shows ==
=== Single exhibitions ===
- 2004: Death by a light of a phonograph at Nomadenoase, Hamburg
- 2007: Eisenkaute at Nomadenoase, Hamburg
- 2010: Transitory Triplet at Splace Berlin, Fernsehturm am Alexanderplatz, Berlin
- 2010: Pantha du Prince at Gallery of Modern Art Brisbane, Australia
- 2013: Pantha du Prince & The Bell Laboratory at Queen Elizabeth Hall, South Bank Center London

=== Group exhibitions ===
- 2005: No competitive offers Dial at ARTIS, Den Bosch, Netherlands
- 2010: Based in Berlin at Kunstwerke, Berlin
- 2013: in C by Terry Riley, Pantha du Prince & The Bell Laboratory im Barbican, London

=== Curatorial engagement ===
- 2011: Kunst als Klang at Vittorio Manalese, Berlin

== Awards ==
- 2011: Echo in the category "Kritikerpreis"
- 2014: Musicboard Berlin – Grant Recipient of the Villa Aurora in Los Angeles
