= Kenny Hawkes =

British DJ

Kenny Hawkes (14 July 1968 – 10 June 2011) was a British DJ and music producer, who worked in the industry from the late 1980s until 2011.

Hawkes grew up in Brighton, England. He is best known for his record collaboration "Play the Game" with Louise Carver, released in 2003 on the Music for Freaks label. "Play the Game" reached number one on the Belgian dance music charts.

== Death ==
Hawkes died in the evening of 10 June 2011 at the age of 42 following an illness.
