= Black Noise (Pantha du Prince album) =

Studio album by Pantha du Prince
- Released: 8 February 2010
- Genre: Minimal techno
- Length: 70:18
- Label: Rough Trade
- Producer: Hendrik Weber

Pantha du Prince chronology
This Bliss (2007)	Black Noise (2010)	Elements of Light (2013)

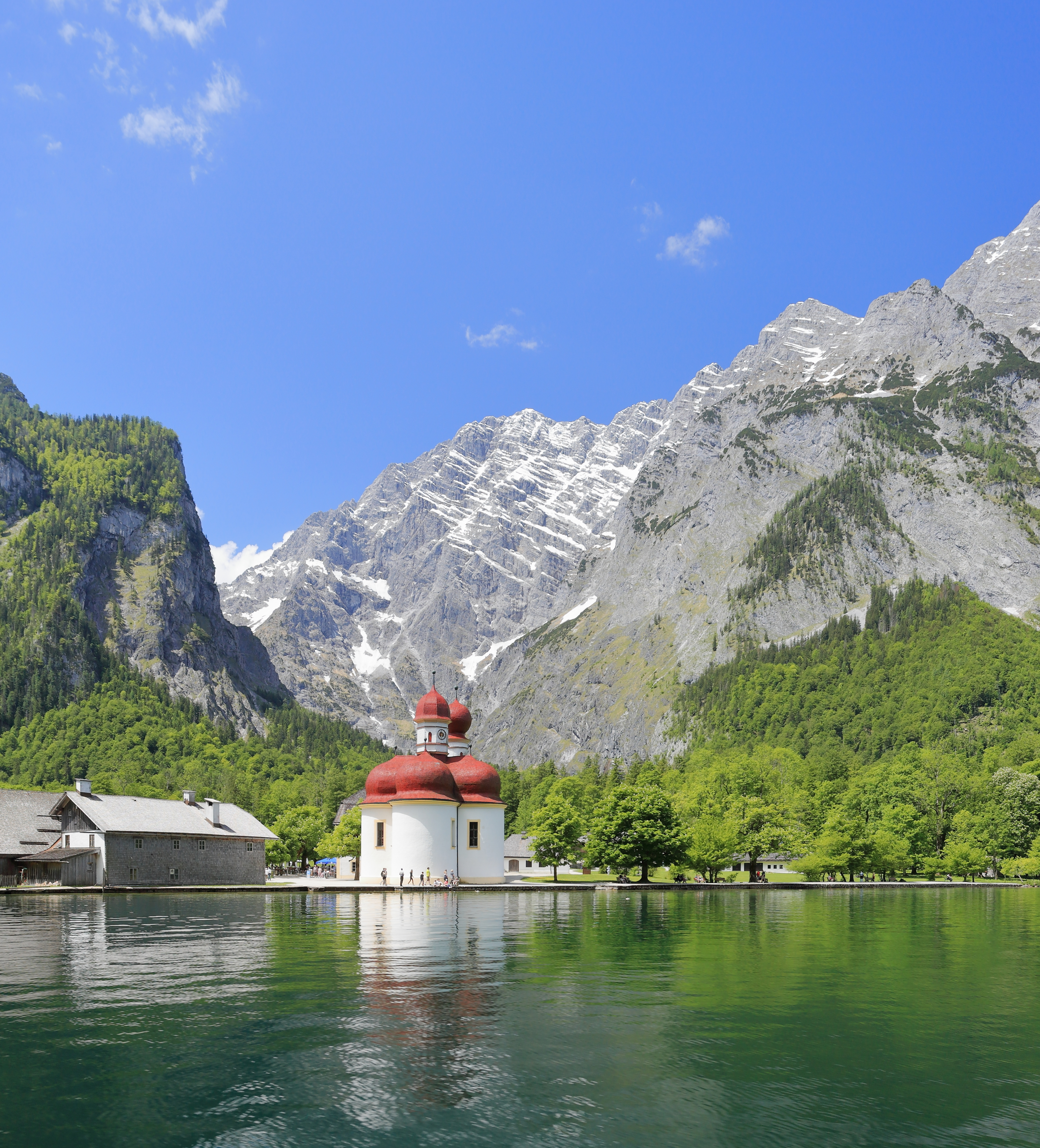
The album art depicts St. Bartholomew's Church in Berchtesgaden, Germany, on the Königssee lake.

Professional ratings
Aggregate scores
Source	Rating
AnyDecentMusic?	7.7/10
Metacritic	83/100
Review scores
Source	Rating
AllMusic	4/5 stars
Clash	8/10
Fact	4.5/5
The Guardian	4/5 stars
The Irish Times	3/5 stars
Pitchfork	8.3/10
Resident Advisor	4.5/5
Spin	7/10
Uncut	4/5 stars
XLR8R	9.5/10

Black Noise is the third studio album by German electronic music producer Pantha du Prince. It was released on 8 February 2010 by Rough Trade Records, serving as his first release on the label. The track "Stick to My Side" features a guest spot from Noah Lennox of Animal Collective, while Tyler Pope of LCD Soundsystem and !!! plays bass on "The Splendour".

== Track listing ==
All tracks are written by Hendrik Weber, except where noted

No.	Title	Length
1.	"Lay in a Shimmer"	6:38
2.	"Abglanz"	6:04
3.	"The Splendour"	6:00
4.	"Stick to My Side" (writers: Weber, Noah Lennox)	7:51
5.	"A Nomads Retreat"	6:41
6.	"Satellite Snyper"	5:29
7.	"Behind the Stars"	6:51
8.	"Bohemian Forest"	7:24
9.	"Welt Am Draht"	7:11
10.	"Im Bann"	3:23
11.	"Es Schneit" (writers: Weber, Vini Reilly)	6:46
Total length:		70:18

== Charts ==
Chart (2010)	Peak position
UK Dance Albums (OCC)	19
US Heatseekers Albums (Billboard)	49
US Top Dance/Electronic Albums (Billboard)	14
