= M'era Luna Festival =

Music festival in Hildesheim, Germany

Coordinates: 52°10′47″N 9°56′56″E

- Genre: NDH, synthpop, future pop, aggrotech, metal, gothic rock, dark wave, ebm
- Dates: August
- Locations: Hildesheim, Germany
- Years active: 2000–present
- Attendance: 20,000–25,000
- Organized by: FKP Scorpio Germany
- Website: www.meraluna.de

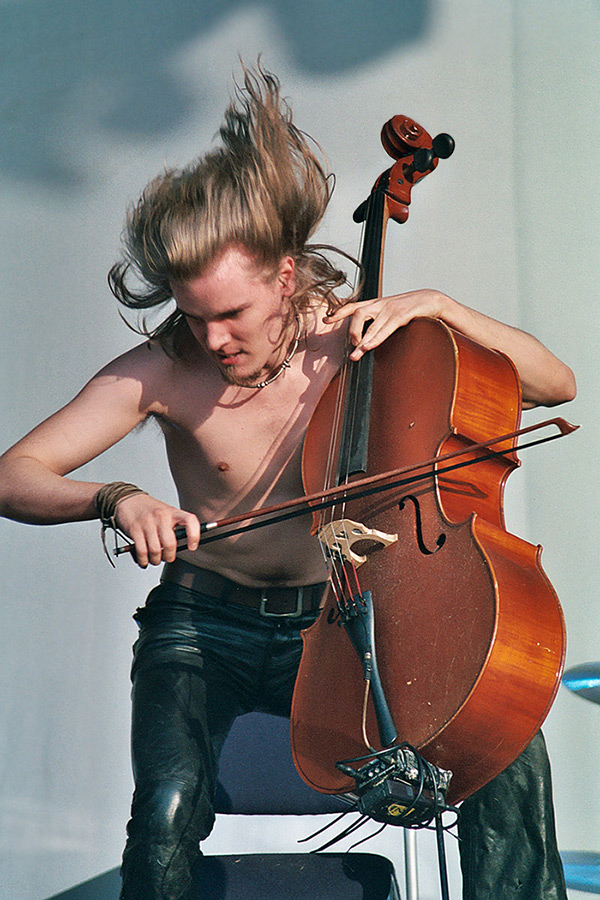
Perttu Kivilaakso of Apocalyptica (2003)

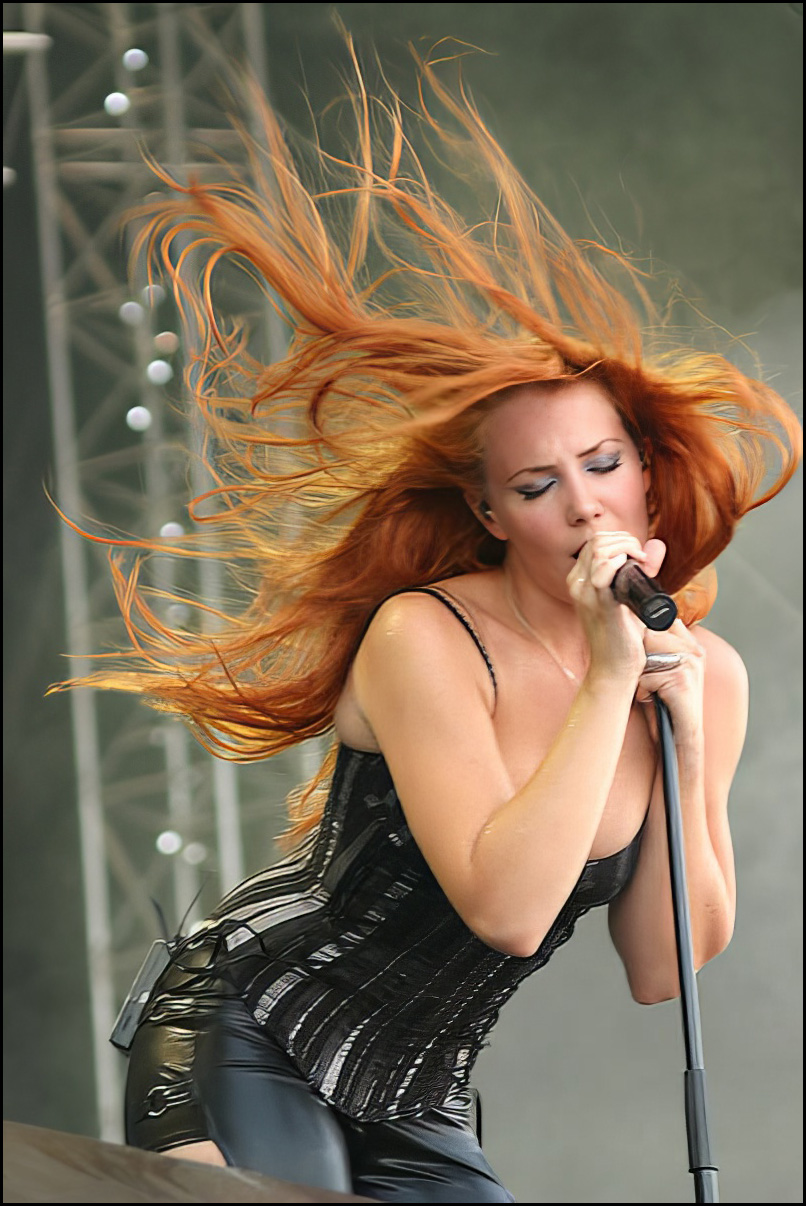
Simone Simons of Epica (2004)

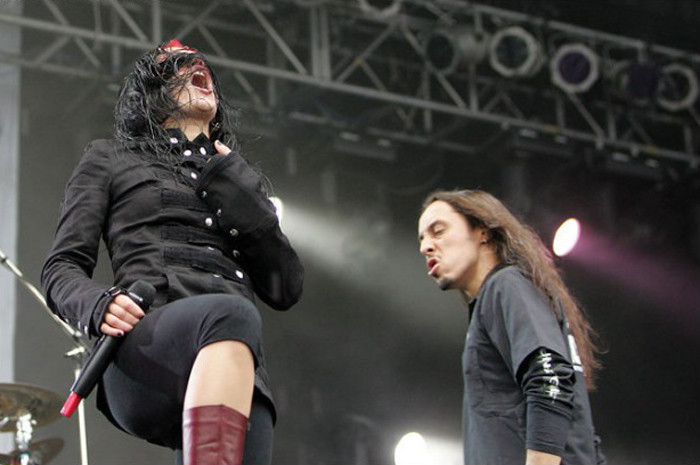
Cristina Scabbia and Andrea Ferro of Lacuna Coil (2005)

The M'era Luna is a gothic festival that encompasses a number of different styles such as metal, future pop, aggrotech, synthpop, gothic rock, dark wave, and EBM. It is held annually on the second weekend of every August, in Hildesheim, Germany at Flugplatz Hildesheim-Drispenstedt, a former British Army airbase.

M'era Luna includes camping facilities and has two stages: a large rock festival-style structure, erected for the show each year, and a former aircraft hangar.

With its 20,000–25,000 regular attendants (21,000 in 2005, 23,000 in 2009, 24,000 in 2010) (many flying in via the Hanover airport, with others traveling via road and railway), the M'era Luna is one of the biggest dark music events in Germany.

The festival's logo is based on the image of the moon from the 1902 film A Trip to the Moon by the French director Georges Méliès. An altered version of the logo was introduced for the 2019 festival.

== Line-ups ==
- 2001: Z.e.t.a.X, Inscape, Pinko Star, Schock, Clan of Xymox, Fading Colours, Zeromancer, Star Industry, Gary Numan, Poems for Laila, Goethes Erben, Lucyfire, Theatre of Tragedy, Lacuna Coil, De/Vision, Letzte Instanz, The 69 Eyes, Justin Sullivan, Covenant, The Inchtabokatables, Wolfsheim, Escape with Romeo, Beborn Beton, T.O.Y., Icon of Coil, Yvonne, Obscyre, Inkubus Sukkubus, S.P.O.C.K., Atrocity, Melotron, Subway to Sally, Terminal Choice, Apoptygma Berzerk, In Strict Confidence, Paradise Lost, Mesh, The Cult, L'Âme Immortelle, Marilyn Manson.
- 2002: Zeraphine, Culture Kultür, The Cascades, Sonar, Pinkostar, Angels and Agony, Tanzwut, Pzycho Bitch, Sulpher, Seabound, Rosenfels, Assemblage 23, L'Âme Immortelle, Welle: Erdball, In Extremo, Blutengel, The 69 Eyes, Hocico, VNV Nation, Suicide Commando, The Sisters of Mercy, Care Company, Z.e.t.a.X, The Bloodflowerz, Elusive, Schandmaul, Carpe Diem, Within Temptation, Ataraxia, Funker Vogt, After Forever, Oomph!, Das Ich, Ikon, Nosferatu, London After Midnight, The Gathering, Soft Cell, Therion, HIM.
- 2003: Placebo, Nightwish, Apocalyptica, Project Pitchfork, Deine Lakaien, Killing Joke, Apoptygma Berzerk, Phillip Boa & The Voodooclub feat. Pia Lund, Subway to Sally, Within Temptation, Camouflage, Blutengel, Terminal Choice, Mesh, Diary of Dreams, In Strict Confidence, Wayne Hussey, Melotron, Unheilig, The Crüxshadows, Red Lorry Yellow Lorry, After Forever, Illuminate, Haujobb, Neuroticfish, Dive, Mila Mar, Qntal, Lithium, Autumn, Evereve, Zeraphine, Gothminister, Xandria, nCor, [:SITD:], Chillburn, Hekate, Colony 5, The Breath Of Life.
- 2004: Oomph!, Wolfsheim, Anne Clark, ASP, Funker Vogt, Covenant, Suicide Commando, The Fair Sex, Blutengel, Within Temptation, Fixmer/McCarthy, In Strict Confidence, The Eternal Afflict, Rotersand, Decoded Feedback, Welle: Erdball, Samsas Traum, Faith and the Muse, Gothminister, Schandmaul, Pink Turns Blue, Chamber, Elis, Cold, Lacrimosa, Therion, De/Vision, Exilia, Warren Suicide, Icon of Coil, Soman, In Extremo, L'Âme Immortelle, The Mission, Tristania, Fiddler's Green, Umbra et Imago, Epica, Saltatio Mortis, Flowing Tears.
- 2005: The Sisters of Mercy, Deine Lakaien, Skinny Puppy, VNV Nation, Hocico, Mesh, Klinik, Diary of Dreams, Subway to Sally, Lacuna Coil, Zeraphine, The Birthday Massacre, Gåte, Faun, The Vision Bleak, Scream Silence, Melotron, Flesh Field, Trisomie 21, Amduscia, KiEw, Cephalgy, Staubkind, Combichrist, The Neon Judgement, [:SITD:], Atrocity, Leaves' Eyes, Potentia Animi, Qntal, Klimt 1918, Schandmaul, The 69 Eyes, The Crüxshadows, NFD, Autumn, Negative, Limbogott, Osiris Taurus, In mitra medusa inri.
- 2006: Sono, Northern Lite, Gothminister, Girls Under Glass, Mesh, Funker Vogt, Die Krupps, Blutengel, Front Line Assembly, Nitzer Ebb, Bauhaus, Mona Mur, Elane, Clan of Xymox, Epica, Letzte Instanz, The Birthday Massacre, Apoptygma Berzerk, Ministry, In Extremo, Within Temptation, Lluther, Regicide, Midnattsol, Dope Stars Inc., Liv Kristine, Unheilig, Samsas Traum, Tristania, Deathstars, The Gathering, Solitary Experiments, XPQ-21, Soman, Spetsnaz, Rotersand, In Strict Confidence, Terminal Choice, De/Vision, ASP.
- 2007: 32 Crash, And One, Angels and Agony, Animal Alpha, Anne Clark, Assemblage 23, Big Boy, Blitzkid, Bloodpit, Client, Covenant, Cultus Ferox, Deine Lakaien und Die Neue Philharmonie Frankfurt, Diorama, Dir En Grey, Down Below, Emilie Autumn, Fair to Midland, IAMX, Implant, Jesus on Extasy, Krypteria, Lacrimas Profundere, My Dying Bride, Necro Facility, Nosferatu, Pain, Proceed, Rabia Sorda, Schandmaul, Skinny Puppy, Suicide Commando, The 69 Eyes, The Crüxshadows, The Jesus and Mary Chain, The LoveCrave, Tool, Warren Suicide, Welle: Erdball.
- 2008: Fields of the Nephilim, New Model Army, Moonspell, Epica, Apoptygma Berzerk, VNV Nation, Front 242, Samael, Combichrist, Hocico, Tanzwut, Mesh, Deutsch Amerikanische Freundschaft, Delain, ASP, Unheilig, The Legendary Pink Dots, Elis, Blitzkid, Cinema Strange, Saltatio Mortis, Ordo Rosarius Equilibrio, Eisbrecher, Agonoize, The Vision Bleak, Elegant Machinery, Rabenschrey, End of Green, Frank the Baptist, Painbastard, The Other, Irfan, Akanoid, Klimt 1918, Paradise Lost.
- 2009: Alexander Veljanov, Apocalyptica, Ashbury Heights, Blutengel, Deathstars, De/Vision, Die Apokalyptischen Reiter, Faderhead, Frozen Plasma, Grendel, Heimataerde, IAMX, Jesus on Extasy, Krypteria, L'Âme Immortelle, Leichtmatrose, Letzte Instanz, Lola Angst, Mina Harker, Nachtmahr, Nightwish, No More, Oomph!, Peter Heppner, Schelmish, Scream Silence, [:SITD:], Spetsnaz, Star Industry, Subway to Sally, The Birthday Massacre, The Crüxshadows, The Prodigy, Tiamat, Tyske Ludder, Untoten, Welle: Erdball, Whispers in the Shadow, Zeraphine, Zeromancer
- 2010: Agonoize, Ambassador21, Amduscia, Angelspit, Brendan Perry, Celine and Nite Wreckage, Colony 5, Combichrist, Crematory, Das Ich, Editors, Eluveitie, Faith and the Muse, Feindflug, Hanzel und Gretyl, Ignis Fatuu, Illuminate, In Extremo, Lacrimas Profundere, Leandra, Nitzer Ebb, Placebo, Punish Yourself, Rabenschrey, Rotersand, Saltatio Mortis, Samsas Traum, Skinny Puppy, Stolen Babies, The 69 Eyes, The Other, The Sisters of Mercy, Unheilig, Zeraphine
- 2011: A Life Divided, Apocalyptica, ASP, Atari Teenage Riot, Blind Passenger, Coppelius, End of Green, Equilibrium, Fetisch:Mensch, Funker Vogt, Gothminister, Hurts, Julien-K, Mesh, Mono Inc., My Dying Bride, Nachtmahr, Project Pitchfork, Tanzwut, Teufel, The Beauty Of Gemina, Tiamat, Tying Tiffany, VNV Nation, Within Temptation, The Mission Veo.
- 2012: Placebo, In Extremo, Subway To Sally, Schandmaul, Fields Of The Nephilim, Eisbrecher, Megaherz, Diary Of Dreams, Suicide Commando, De/Vision, Leæther Strip, Welle: Erdball, KMFDM, The Beauty Of Gemina, Faun, Amduscia, Letzte Instanz, Lacrimas Profundere, Rabia Sorda, Noisuf-X, Heimataerde, Roterfield, Lahannya, Jäger 90, Les Jupes, Officers.
- 2013: Nightwish, HIM, ASP, Front 242, Front Line Assembly, Deine Lakaien, Blutengel, Apoptygma Berzerk, Mono Inc., The Crüxshadows, Staubkind, Saltatio Mortis, Tanzwut, Klinik, IAMX (cancelled), End Of Green, [:SITD:], Nachtmahr, Kirlian Camera, Haujobb, Diorama, Clan Of Xymox, Coppelius, Ost+Front, Eisenfunk, Lord of the Lost, Unzucht, ASP & Kai Meyer, Markus Heitz, Boris Koch, Christian von Aster, u.v.a., Molllust.
- 2014: Within Temptation, And One, Marilyn Manson, In Extremo, Deine Lakaien, Subway To Sally, ASPs von Zaubererbrüdern, Paradise Lost, Lacrimas Profundere, Covenant, Faun, Die Krupps, Combichrist, De/Vision, DAF, Leæther Strip, Hocico, Letzte Instanz, Das Ich, Stahlmann, Spetsnaz, Darkhaus, X-RX, Rabia Sorda, Neuroticfish, Solitary Experiments, Ignis Fatuu, Heimataerde, Solar Fake, CHROM, Feuerschwanz, The Beauty Of Gemina, Henke, Ambassador21, Sündenklang, Meinhard, microClocks
- 2015: Nightwish, ASP, Rob Zombie, Einsturzende Neubauten, Blutengel, Phillip Boa and the Voodooclub, Mono Inc, Saltatio Mortis, Apoptygma Berzerk, L'Âme Immortelle, Anne Clark feat. Herrb, X-RX, Joachim Witt, Deathstars, Tanzwut, Rotersand, In Strict Confidence, Lord of the Lost, Nachtmahr, Dope Stars Inc., Aesthetic Perfection, Assemblage 23, Tying Tiffany, Merciful Nuns, Melotron, Absolute Body Control, Ost+Front, Coppelius, Unzucht, Frozen Plasma, Tyske Ludder, Versengold, The Other, Schwarzer Engel, Spielbann, Nachtgeschrei, Private Pact, Elvellon
- 2016: Within Temptation, The Sisters of Mercy, In Extremo, VNV Nation, Lacrimosa, Eisbrecher, Apocalyptica, The Lord of The Lost Ensemble, Faun, Diary of Dreams, OOMPH!, Combichrist, IAMX, Hocico, Die Krupps, Suicide Commando, Lacrimas Profundere, Letze Instanz, [:SITD:], Zeromancer, Diorama, S.P.O.C.K, Gothminister, Stahlmann, The Cassandra Complex, Beborn Beton, Noisuf-X, Centhron, Rabia Sorda, Hämatom, Agent Side Grinder, Heldmaschine, A Life Divided, CHROM, Me The Tiger, Aeverium, Erdling, Vlad In Tears, Essence of Mind, Shaârghot, Christian Von Aster, Luci van Org, Markus Heitz
- 2017: Markus Heitz, Alexander Wohnhaas, Christian von Aster, Circus of Fools, Eden Weint Im Grab, Unzucht, Ost+Front, Feuerschwanz, Mesh, White Lies, Project Pitchfork, Subway to Sally, ASP, Korn, Johnny Deathshadow, Schwarzer Engel, Darkhaus, Versengold, Megaherz, The Crûxshadows, Mono Inc., Schandmaul, Blutengel, And One
- 2018: The Prodigy, Eisbrecher, Peter Heppner. In Extremo, Ministry, Apoptygma Berzerk, London After Midnight, Lord of the Lost, The 69 Eyes, In Strict Confidence, Nachtmahr, Tanzwut, Zeraphine, Welle:Erdball, Clan of Xymox, Das Ich, Rabia Sorda, Merciful Nuns, Erdling, Eisfabrik, Cephalgy, Whispering Sons, Cyborg, Front 242, Saltatio Mortis, L'Âme Immortelle, Hocico, Atari Teenage Riot, Rotersand, Lacrimas Profundere, Bannkreis, Aesthetic Perfection, Die Kammer, Frozen Plasma, Heimatærde, Torul, FabrikC, Massive Ego, Schattenmann, Too Dead To Die
- 2019: ASP, VNV Nation, Within Temptation, Die Krupps, [:SITD], Lacrimosa, Zeromancer, Mono Inc., Agonoize, Oomph!, Neuroticfish, Corvus Corax, X-Rx, Deathstars, Centhron, Stahlmann, Terrolokaust, Ewigheim, Sono, Sündenklang, Empathy Test, Null Positiv, Suicide Commando, Fields Of The Nephilim, De/Vision, Subway To Sally, Assemblage 23, Joachim Witt, Spetsnaz, Combichrist, Funker Vogt, Diary of Dreams, Melotron, Versengold, Heldmaschine, Faelder, Formalin, Scarlet Dorn, Yellow Lazarus, Fear of Domination.
- 2020: The 2020 M'era Luna Festival was canceled due to the COVID-19 pandemic.
- 2021: The 2021 M'era Luna Festival was canceled due to the COVID-19 pandemic.
- 2022: A Life Divided, Adam Is a Girl, Aeverium, Ambassador21, ASP ft. The Little Big Men, Blutengel, CHROM, Combichrist, Diorama, Eisbrecher, Enemy Inside, Faderhead, Feuerschwanz, Front Line Assembly, Haujobb, Hell Boulevard, In Strict Confidence, Lacrimas Profundere, Nachtmahr, Nitzer Ebb, Noisuf-X, Ost+Front, Oul, Priest, Qntal, Rave the Reqviem, Rotersand, Schandmaul, Schattenmann, Solitary Experiments, Soman, The Beauty of Gemina, The Lord of the Lost Ensemble, The Mission, The Sisters of Mercy, Then Comes Silence, Tyske Ludder, Unzucht, VNV Nation Classical
- 2023: Absolute Body Control, Agonoize, Amduscia, Antiage, A Projection, Ashbury Heights, Blitz Union, De/Vision, Diary of Dreams, Dragol, Eisfabrik, Frozen Plasma, Girls Under Glass, Gothminister, Heldmaschine, Hocico, In Extremo, Intent:Outtake, Joachim Witt, L’Âme Immortelle, Letzte Instanz, Manntra, Megaherz, Melotron, Mesh, Mono Inc., Neuroticfish, Peter Heppner, Project Pitchfork, Rabia Sorda, Rave The Reqviem, She Hates Emotions, Solar Fake, Subway to Sally, Tanzwut, The 69 Eyes, Versus Goliath, VV (Ville Valo), Wisborg, Within Temptation
- 2024: ASP, Assemblage 23, The Cassandra Complex, Centhron, Combichrist, dArtagnan, Das Ich, Deathstars, Deine Lakaien, Die Herren Wesselsky, Die Krupps, Eden weint im Grab, Epica, Erdling, Extize, Front 242, Future lied to us, Hämatom, Hell Boulevard, JanRevolution, Lacrimas Profundere, London After Midnight, Lord of the Lost, Oomph!, Re.Mind, RROYCE, Saltatio Mortis, Schandmaul, Schwarzer Engel, She Past Away, SITD, S.P.O.C.K, Stahlmann, Steril, Suicide Commando, VNV Nation, Welle: Erdball, [x]-Rx, Zeraphine
- 2025: Ambassador21, And One, Apocalyptica, Beyond Border, Blutengel, Chris Harms, CHROM, Coppelius, Corlyx, Corvus Corax, Covenant, De/Vision, Eisbrecher, Faderhead, Faun, Funker Vogt, Heilung, Heimatærde, In Strict Confidence, Lacuna Coil, Leæther Strip, Lord of the Lost, Manntra, Massive Ego, Noisuf-X, Null Positiv, Ost+Front, Peter Murphy, Rotersand, Samsas Traum, Schattenmann, Sierra Veins, Solar Fake, Stimmgewalt, Subway to Sally, Tanzwut, Torul, Universum25, Vanguard, Versengold
- 2026: Aesthetic Perfection, Agonoize, Auger, Beyond Obsession, Clan of Xymox, Combichrist, Die Krupps, Diorama, Eisenfunk, Final Selection, Floor Jansen, Front Line Assembly, Hocico, IAMX, In Extremo, Jesus on Extasy, L'Âme Immortelle, Lacrimosa, M. Walking on the Water, Megaherz, Mortes, Nachtmahr, Neuroticfish, OMD, Principe Valiente, Saltatio Mortis, Skynd, Sotiria, Stahlmann, Synthattack, Tabernis, The Birthday Massacre, The 69 Eyes, The Beauty of Gemina, Then Comes Silence, Tyske Ludder, Unzucht, White Lies, Within Temptation, Xandria
- 2027: Alienare, Assemblage 23, Das Ich, Diary of Dreams, Feuerschwanz, Frozen Plasma, Schandmaul, Suicide Commando, The Sisters of Mercy, VNV Nation

== See also ==
- List of gothic festivals
- List of industrial music festivals
- List of heavy metal festivals
- Zillostrierte Music Magazine
