= Tyske Ludder =

German band

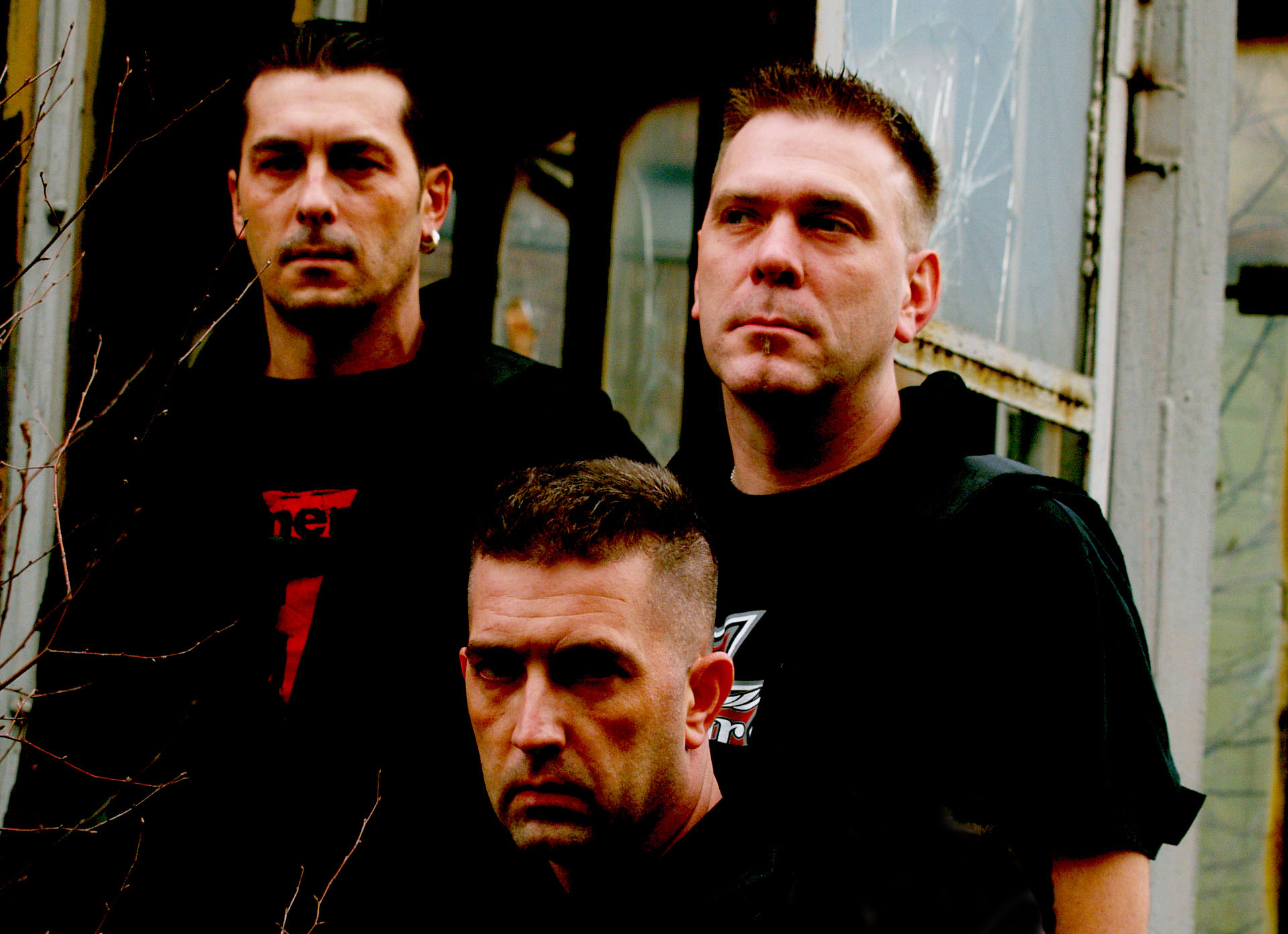
- Tyske Ludder – 2007

Background information
- Origin: Germany
- Genres: Dark electro; Electronic body music; Industrial; Techno
- Years active: 1989–present
- Labels: Black Rain; Golden Core; 73 Sec Bismarck; KM-Musik
- Spinoffs: HarmJoy
- Members: Claus Albers (1989-); Olaf A. Reimers (1989–); Jay Taylor (2014–); Sebastian I. Hartmann (2009–2012, 2019–)
- Past members: Ralf Homann (1991-2016); Lars Bürvenich (1995–1996)
- Website: www.tyske-ludder.com

Tyske Ludder is a German EBM band. Their members include Claus Albers, Olaf A. Reimers, Ralf Homann and Sebastian I. Hartmann. In 2008 they appeared at the Infest in Bradford. And in May 2009 they appeared at the Wave-Gotik-Treffen in Leipzig and the M'era Luna Festival in Hildesheim, Germany. The phrase Tyske Ludder directly translated means "German whores" in Danish and Norwegian and was used in Denmark to describe a native woman that was romantically involved with a German soldier during World War II.

== History ==
Claus Albers and Olaf A. Reimers met during the early 1980s in school. Reimers played in various rock and punk bands, but after becoming frustrated with the arrangements approached Albers to start a new band. The duo started out with a third member as a bassist under the name Der Kleine Rosa Plüschelefant, Der Kleiner Haben Wollte as a punk and new wave project. They later renamed to The Leaders of Men and drifted towards a more industrial/EBM sound. After a few live performances and a demo recording, the band reverted to a duo of Albers and Reimers and took a deliberate turn into an all-electronic format circa 1989. Ralf Homann joined as live support while the band considered a name change. Desiring a Nordic-sounding, provocative name, they settled on Tyske Ludder, essentially a Norwegian slur for women who consorted with occupying German soldiers in World War II.

By 1993, the band gained the attention of the German KM-Musik label and recorded their first studio album, Bombt Die Mörder? which was released by the label in 1994. The album's content and title were inspired by growing right-wing extremism in Europe and the civil war in the former Yugoslavia. Their second album, Dalmarnock, followed in 1995 and was produced by André Schmechta of X Marks the Pedwalk at his T.G.I.F. Studios.

Reimers subsequently relocated for professional reasons which put a strain on the band's ability to produce music together. They managed to compile material for the Creutzfeldt E.P. in 1996, but then took a creative break until 2003 to concentrate on their personal and professional lives.

In 2003, Reimers relocated again, returning to closer proximity with the other band members. The band reunited for a live show at the Beatclub in Dessau and were reinvigorated by the positive audience response. A change of ownership at KM-Musik led the band to dissolve their contract with the label and, on the recommendation of their friends in the band Feindflug, signed to the Black Rain label. The band recorded several albums for Black Rain beginning with Sojus in 2006 and ending with the Bambule E.P. in 2013. In the years following the band's resumption of activities, access to better production tools and producers helped diverify the band's sound, retaining a danceable, EBM core but incorporating more complex and experimental ideas.

The rejuvenated Tyske Ludder placed a heavier emphasis on live performance, bringing a more visual stage design including camouflage nets, video projections, and other design elements to complement their aggressive stage presence. Notable live appearances included opening support for Deutsch Amerikanische Freundschaft in 2009 and 2012, as well as Infest Festival, Wave-Gotik-Treffen, and the M'era Luna Festival.

Meanwhile, Reimers joined with Dan von Hoyel to form the band Harmjoy. From this collaboration, Tyske Ludder came into working with producers Andreas Schmitz, Hilger Tintel, and Krischan Jan-Eric Wesenberg. The trio of producers co-produced their album Evolution in 2015 which as released on the Golden Core label, a rock and metal imprint of ZYX Music Europe. Meanwhile, Jay Taylor, percussionist for Tactical Sekt and Harmjoy, joined the band in 2014.

Beginning in 2019, the band released several E.P.s on the 73 Seconds Bismarck label as well as numerous self-released singles.

== Gallery ==
Tyske Ludder, Line-up live at Nocturnal Culture Night 2018 in Deutzen

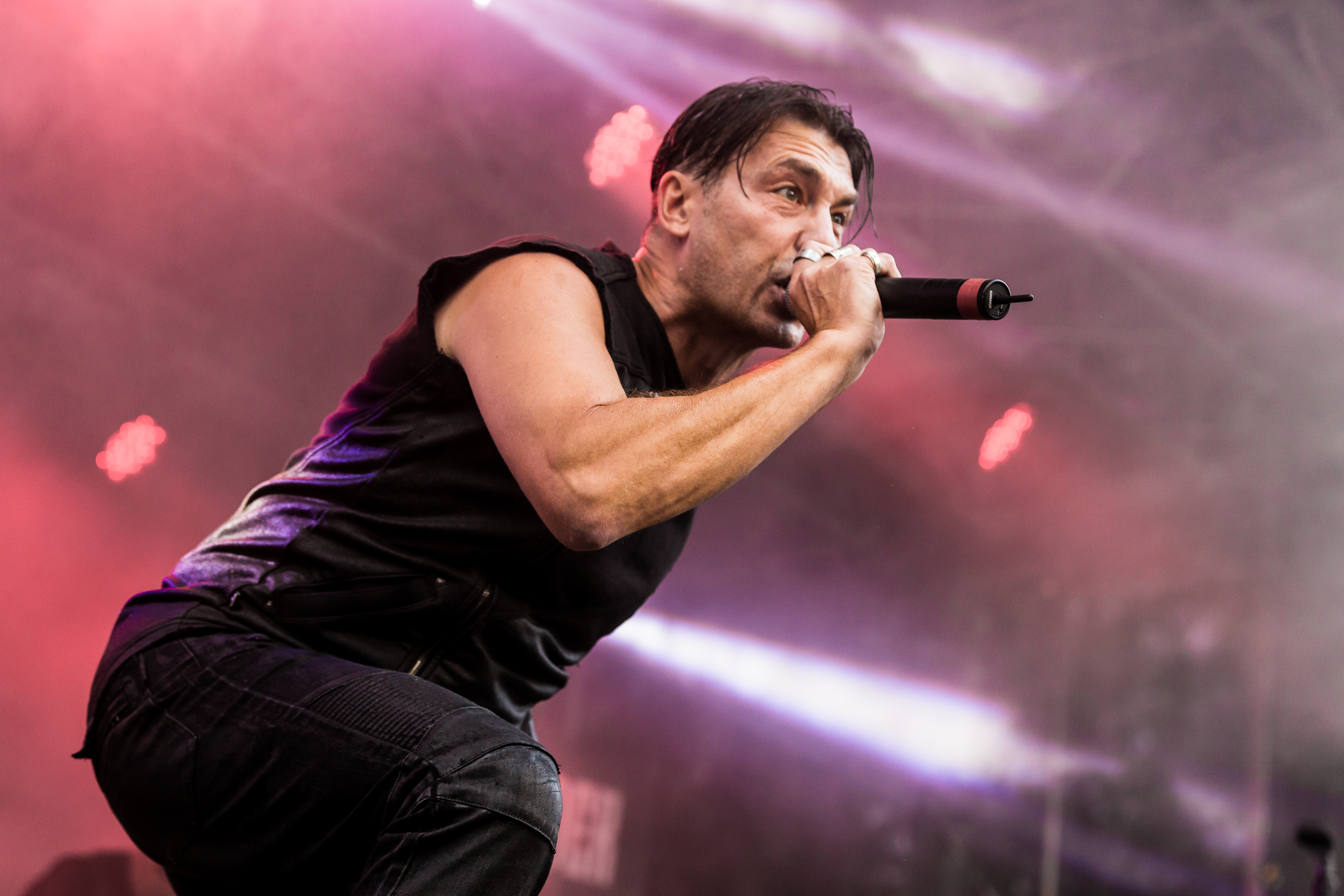
Singer Claus Albers

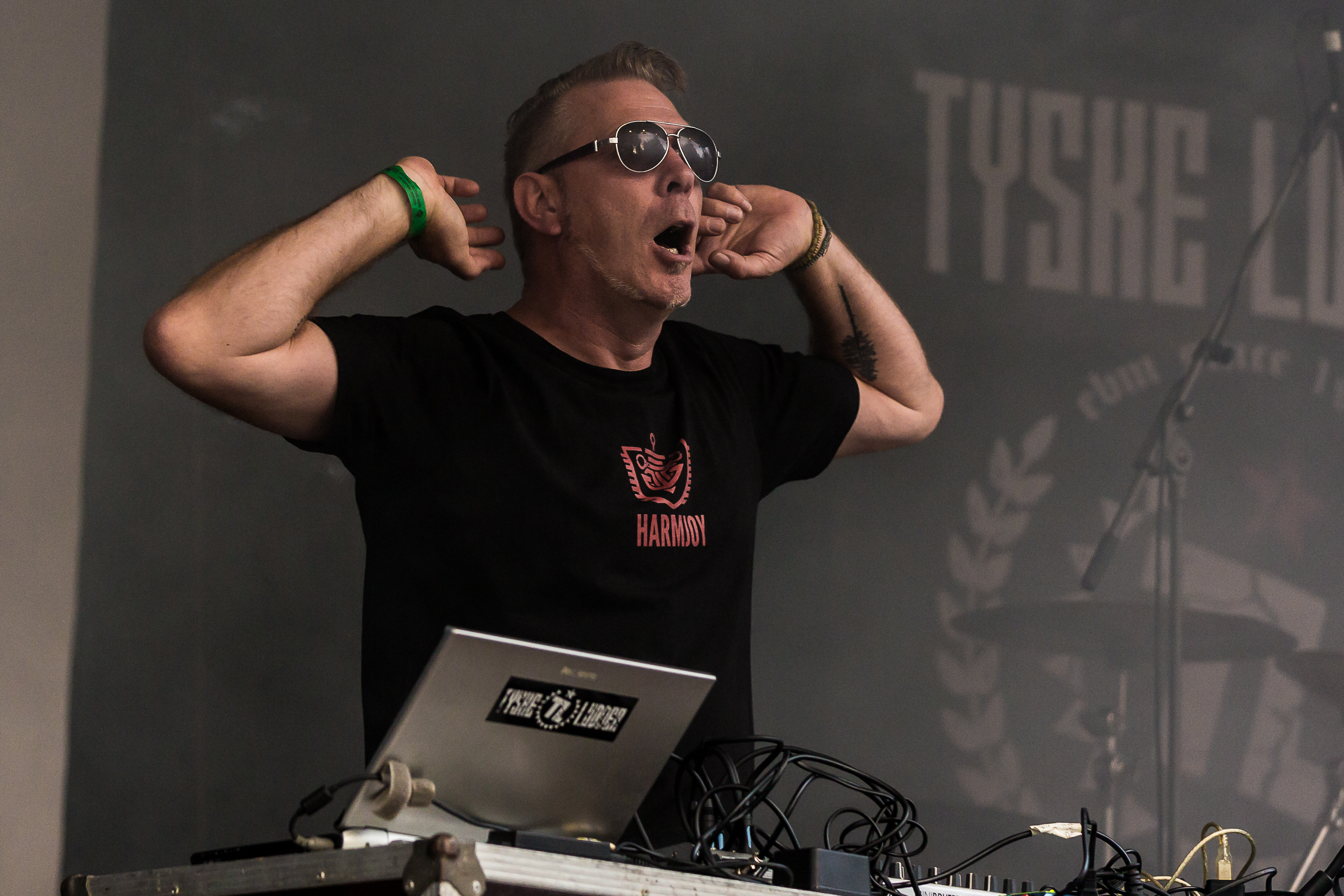
Keyboarder Olaf A. Reimers

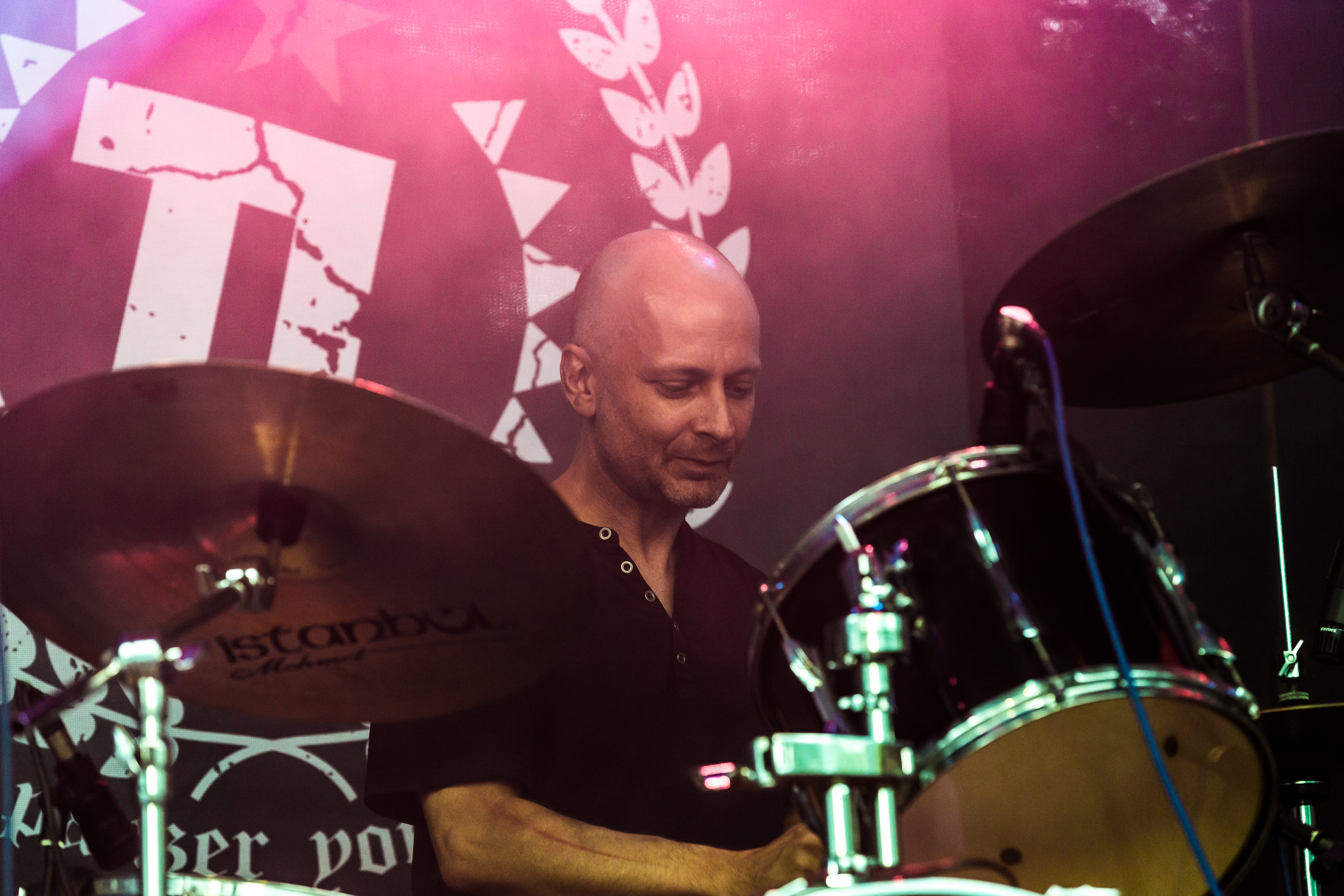
Drummer Andreas Schmitz

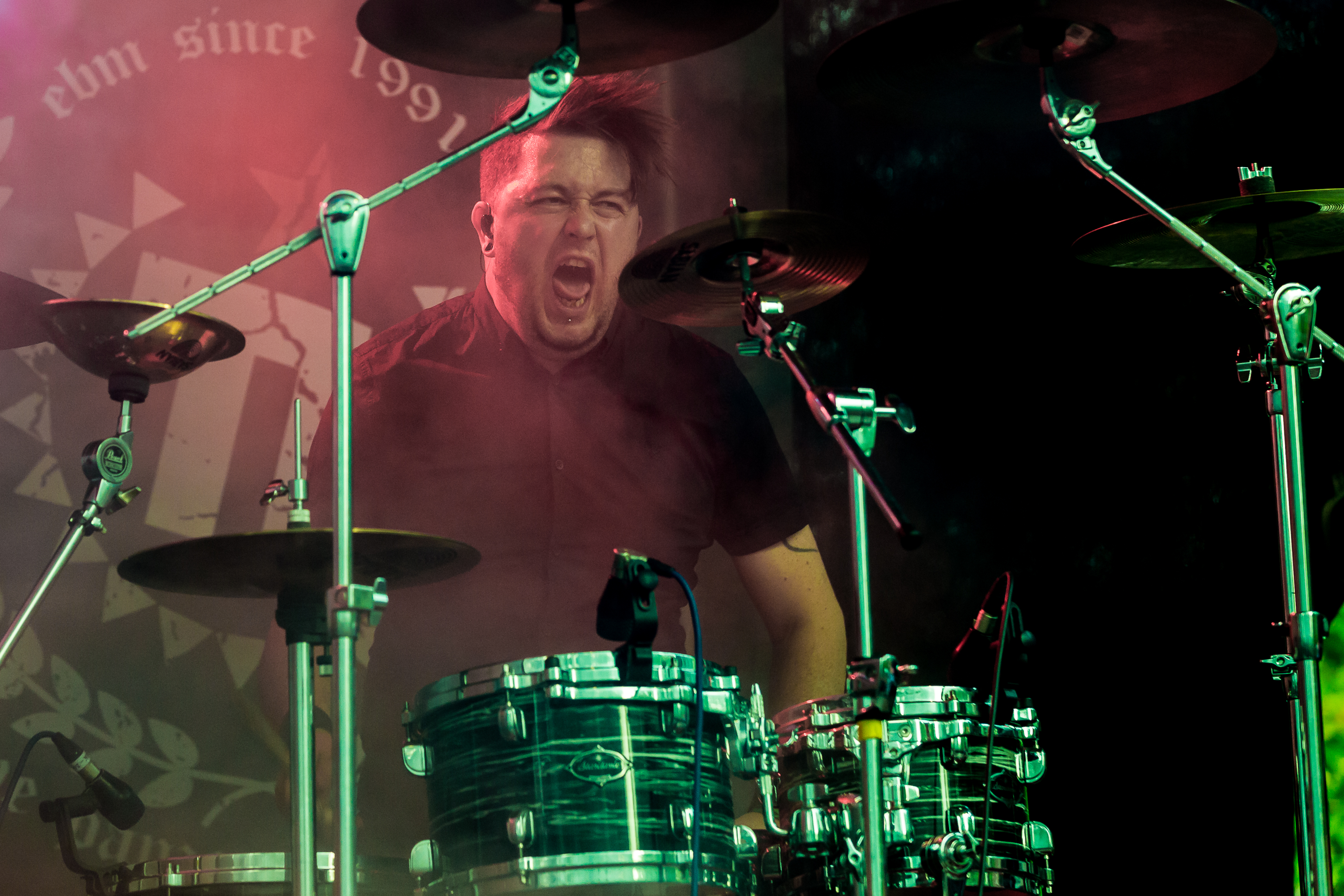
Drummer Jay Taylor

== Discography ==
=== Albums ===
- 1994: Bombt die Mörder? – KM-MUSIK
- 1995: Dalmarnock – KM-MUSIK
- 2006: Союз (Sojus) – Black Rain
- 2006: Bombt die Mörder? – Re-Release with many remixes at Black Rain
- 2006: Dalmarnock – Re-Release with many remixes at Black Rain
- 2009: Anonymous - Black Rain
- 2011: Diaspora - Black Rain
- 2015: Evolution - Golden Core

=== EPs ===
- 1996: Creutzfeld E.P. – EP at KM-MUSIK
- 2006: Creutzfeld E.P. – Re-Release of the EP with many remixes at Black Rain
- 2008: SCIENTific technOLOGY E.P. - EP at Black Rain
- 2013: Bambule E.P. – E.P. at Black Rain
- 2019: Frohes Festung Europa - EP at 73SECBISMARCK
- 2021: Ungewiss - EP at 73SECBISMARCK
- 2021: Kaputt - EP at 73SECBISMARCK
- 2022: Transformation - EP at 73SECBISMARCK

=== Remixes & Other appearances ===
- 2006: In Sedens – Remix for Grandchaos – God Is Dead (Tyske Ludder Remix) (3:49) – Deathkon Media
- 2007: Methods To Madness – Remix for – Brain Leisure – Defect (Tyske Ludder Remix) (5:15) – Vendetta Music
- 2007: When Angels Die – Remix for E-Craft – FunnyStuff & Violence (BrutallyComeFirstRmx) (4:06) – COP International
- 2008: Blasphemous Radicals E.P. – Remix for Nurzery (Rhymes) – My Babylon (Tyske Ludder Remix) (3:51) – COP International

=== Compilations ===
- Demo Compilation Vol. 3 (CD, Maxi) – A.I.D.S. – KM-Musik, Sounds Of Delight
- 1993: Art & Dance 4 (CD) – Zu Viel, Barthalomäus – Gothic Arts Records / Lost Paradise
- 1993: Take Off Music Volume 1 (CD) – Energie – KM-Musik
- 1994: Demo Compilation Vol. 1 (CD, Maxi) – Wie Der Stahl Gehärtet – KM-Musik, Sounds Of Delight
- 1995: An Ideal For Living 2 (CD, Ltd) – Blutrausch – Gothic Arts Records / Lost Paradise
- 1998: Electrocity Level X (CD) – Monotonie (SutterCaine Remix) – Ausfahrt
- 1999: Wellenreiter In Schwarz Vol. 3 (2 CD) – Grelle Farben – Credo, Nova Tekk
- 2005: Bodybeats (CD) – Innenraum (Sutter Cain Remix) – COP International
- 2006: Hymns Of Steel (CD) – Betrayal (Alloyed Steel Remix) – Machineries Of Joy
- 2006: Interbreeding VIII: Elements Of Violence (2 CD) – Betrayal – (Wertstahl US...) BLC Productions
- 2006: Orkus Compilation 16 (CD, Sampler, Enh) – Canossa – Orkus
- 2007: A Compilation 2 (2 CD) – Canossa – Black Rain
- 2007: Dark Visions 2 (DVD, PAL) – Canossa – Zillo
- 2007: ElektroStat 2007 (CD) – Bionic Impression Oslo Synthfestival
- 2008: Zillo – New Signs & Sounds (CD) – Thetanen (Cruise-Up-Your-Ass-Edit by nurzery [rhymes]) – Zillo
- 2008: A Compilation 3 (2 CD) – Thetanen – Black Rain
- 2009: 12. Elektrisch Festival - Wie der Stahl gehärtet wurde (live), Khaled Aker (live) - Black A$
- 2009: Extreme Lustlieder 3 (CD) - Bastard
- 2009: Black Snow - Fairytale of the North - Black Rain
