= Jesus on Extasy =

German electronic rock band

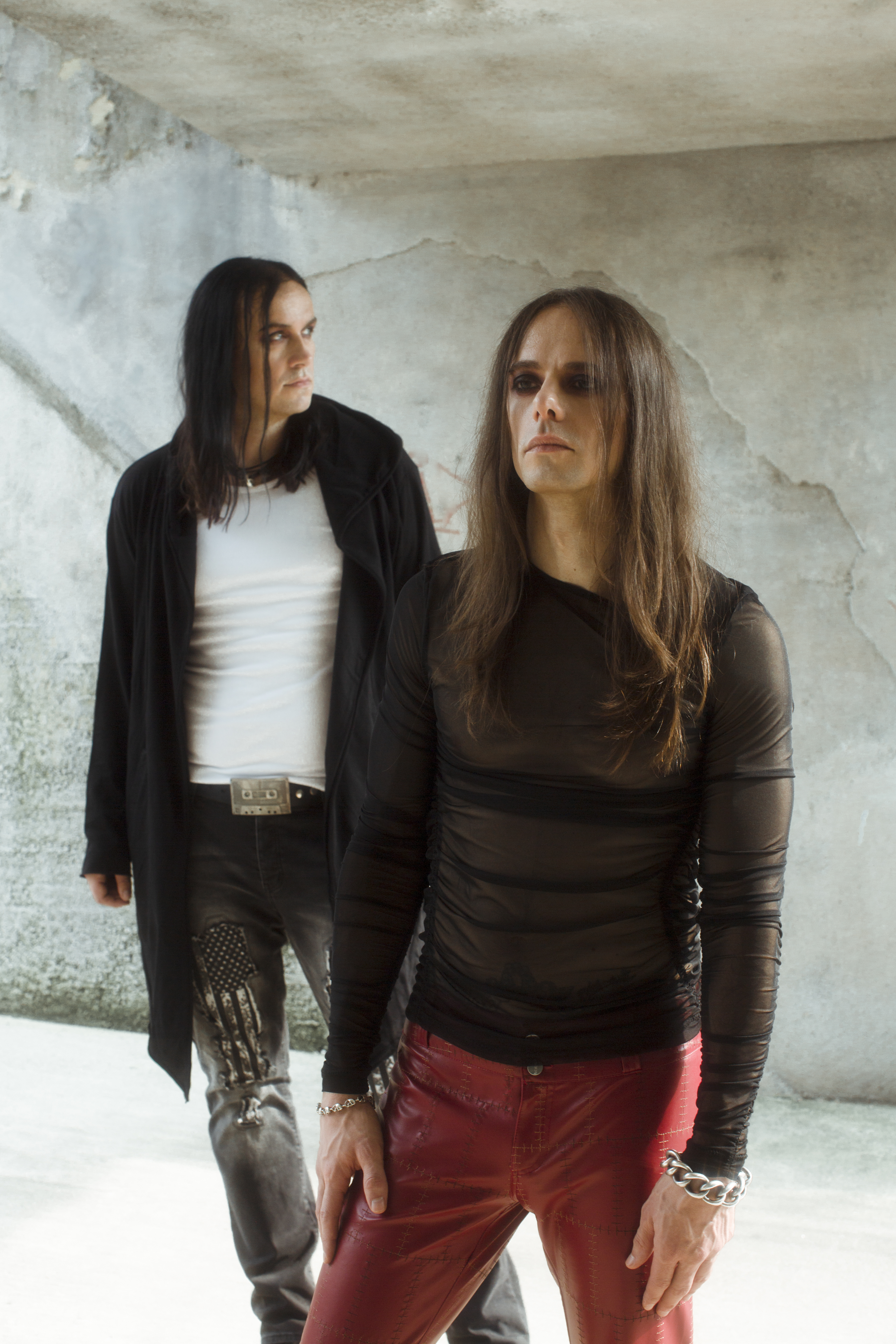
- Jesus On Extasy during a promotional photo shoot at the world heritage site Zeche Zollverein, Essen Germany.

Background information
- Origin: Essen, Germany
- Genres: Industrial rock, alternative rock, electronic rock, glam rock, alternative metal
- Years active: 2005-2014, 2020-present
- Members: Dorian Deveraux; Chai Deveraux
- Past members: Manja Kaletka BJ; Leandra Ophelia Dax; BJ; Chris F. Kassad; Dino Steinherr; Alicia Vayne Ivy Deveraux

Jesus on Extasy (abbreviated "JoE") is an electronic rock band from Essen, Germany, formed in 2005 by Dorian Deveraux and Chai Deveraux. The band's musical style can be described as a hybrid of rock and metal elements and electronic music. After breaking up in 2014, the band announced their reunion on their Facebook page in October 2020.

== History ==
The first demo EP "Assassinate Us" was produced in 2005 in Chai Deveraux's own Sinustal studio in Essen, where the band also worked on the pre-productions for their albums in later years. The EP was described in the "Demozone" section of the music magazine Sonic Seducer in the review by music journalist Francois Duchateau as a record "that not only promises, but delivers what the potential promises". Jesus on Extasy made their first appearance in July 2006 at the Bochum Total Festival, one of the largest music festivals in Europe. As part of this performance, the record company Drakkar Entertainment signed the band a short time later.

The debut album Holy Beauty was released on March 30, 2007, and received mostly positive reviews. In addition to ten original songs, a remix of the single "Assassinate Me" by industrial metal pioneers KMFDM was also included on the album.

In March, as part of the album's release, the band embarked on a short tour with violin-rock band Letzte Instanz, also signed to Drakkar Entertainment. This was followed by an extensive Germany tour in May with Dope Stars Inc. (Italy) and Entwine (Finland). Various festival appearances followed in the summer of the same year, including Bochum Total, the Woodstage Festival (with Marilyn Manson and Type O Negative) and the M'era Luna Festival, as well as a headlining Germany tour in the fall, in which Jesus on Extasy were supported as supporting act at some concerts by the Hamburg post-industrial band Philiae. At the end of the year the band performed at the festival series "On A Dark Winter's Night" in Salzburg and Oberhausen together with bands like Nightwish and Dope Stars Inc.

In May 2008, Jesus on Extasy released their second album, Beloved Enemy, through Drakkar Entertainment. It entered the German Alternative Charts (GAC) at number 1 and was again given mostly positive reviews.

In order to promote the album, festival appearances followed, among others at the Wave Gotik Treffen or the Summer Breeze Festival in Dinkelsbühl, as well as an autumn tour supporting the Neue-Deutsche-Härte band Eisbrecher.

2009 marked the first year in the band's existence that Jesus on Extasy did not release an album. The band played selected festival gigs, including the Amphi Festival in Cologne and the M'era Luna Festival in Hildesheim. The band said they wanted to concentrate on the production of the third album. Also in 2010, the band let their live activities largely rest and only played a few selected concerts, including in the Hamburg Prinzenbar, at the Blackfield Festival in Gelsenkirchen and a headlining gig in the city of Donaueschingen. The third, self-produced album No Gods was released on August 27, 2010, through Drakkar Entertainment (in Europe and the rest of the world) and Artoffact Records (American continent).

In January 2011, Jesus on Extasy announced the split from singer Dorian Deveraux . Bassist BJ and keyboardist Ophelia Dax also left the band. After joining the Norwegian synth-rock band Apoptygma Berzerk, Dax was no longer able to be a part of Jesus On Extasy. Chai Deveraux then founded his own label Farscape Records and found a new voice for Jesus On Extasy in singer Manja Kaletka. On October 7, 2011, the studio album The Clock was released. In the same year the band went on tour with the German gothic metal band Lord of the Lost.

In December 2014, the band announced their dissolution. After short teaser videos were published on the official Jesus On Extasy Facebook page in autumn 2020 after a long period of inactivity, the band announced on October 31, 2020, that they wanted to release another album with Dorian Deveraux as singer.

In 2021 industrial rock pioneers KMFDM scheduled Jesus On Extasy as a support act for their 2022 Europe tour, but due to COVID restrictions the tour was first pushed to 2023 and then cancelled entirely after the headliner's decision to cease touring Europe "for good", as singer Sascha Konietzko stated on his personal Facebook page.

== Musical style ==
The band combines influences of synth rock, industrial rock and glam rock. The strong contrast between the electronic sounds and the hard guitar elements has become the band's trademark style.

Chai Deveraux also used those influences as a remixer in his interpretations of songs from other bands. In his Sinustal recording studio in Essen, Chai has produced remixes for bands such as ASP, Krieger, New Model Army, Dommin and Xandria.

== Reception ==
=== Holy Beauty ===
The band's debut album, Holy Beauty, was largely positively received by the music press. The German music magazine Zillo dedicated the cover of its March 2007 issue to Jesus on Extasy and gave the band the title "Newcomer of the Year". Music journalist Sascha Blach praised the "stimulating sounds somewhere between industrial, gothic and rock" in his review. The pieces on the album were "easy to catch" and were convincing "especially in terms of the melody," Blach continued. Sonic Seducer magazine called the band "New Industrial Rock Highlight" in its March 2007 issue and wrote that Jesus on Extasy are the "prophets on the digital rock horizon" that "the New Generation has been screaming at the top of their lungs for". With their debut album, the band "undoubtedly nailed a classic to the cross". Orkus magazine named JoE "Newcomer of the Month" in its April 2007 issue. Michael Edele from the online magazine laut.de praised the band's "absolutely positive overall impression of the debut". Powermetal.de attested the band a "first-class album of unconventional music" that was "a true rejuvenation for a somewhat dusty and deadlocked genre".

=== Beloved Enemy ===
Sascha Blach of the music magazine Zillo praised the fact that the album was "not just a rehash of the debut" and that the production was "more organic, rougher and heavier". "A broad spectrum in the intersection of rock, alternative, electronic and gothic is served", which makes the band "attractive for different target groups". Zillo magazine devoted its front page and a multi-page cover story to Jesus On Extasy on the occasion of the release of their second album, Beloved Enemy. The band has also been featured on the covers of Orkus, Gothic magazine, Rockoon and Negatief. In 2008, teen magazines also became aware of Jesus On Extasy. In December 2008, the youth newspaper Popcorn called the band one of the "coolest bands in the emo scene" on a double page spread. The same medium called singer Dorian Deveraux one of the "new cult stars" in its March 2009 issue. In terms of music, the magazine Be Subjective praised above all that the album was a heavy chunk in terms of content due to the "post-oriented mood and critical side swipes". However, "the songs are varied" and convince "with creativity, dynamics, catchy melodies and rhythms and know how to captivate in this way".

=== No Gods ===
The band's third album also received mostly positive reviews. The online magazine Terrorverlag, which is otherwise rather critical of the band, praised the "rockier, more biting sound" and "a catchiness that cannot be denied". Powermetal.de saw solid industrial metal in the album as well as maintaining the level of the previous albums, but without further development. Monkeypress.de, on the other hand, liked the willingness to take risks with which the album was produced after many personnel changes: "the changes in the JOE camp had a positive effect, as more daring was done here and almost gone all the way." Laut.de found the album "unusually snappy" and attested to the band's "unmistakable progress in terms of songwriting", but struggled with the singer's vocal performance.

== Discography ==
=== Albums ===
- Holy Beauty - Drakkar Entertainment, 2007
- Beloved Enemy - Drakkar Entertainment, 2008
- No Gods - Drakkar Entertainment, 2010
- The Clock - Artoffact Records, 2011
- Between Despair and Disbelief - Metropolis Records, 2025

=== Singles ===
- "Assassinate Me" (Promo, Drakkar Entertainment), 2007
- "Nuclear Bitch" (Promo, Drakkar Entertainment), 2007
- "Stay With Me" (Promo, Drakkar Entertainment), 2008
- "Beloved Enemy" (Promo, Drakkar Entertainment), 2008

=== EPs ===
- Assassinate Us - self-produced, 2007
- Sisters of the Light - Drakkar Entertainment, 2007 (as Xandria Vs. Jesus on Extasy)

=== Solo albums by band members ===
==== Dorian Deveraux ====
- FTANNG
  - ... and no one seemed to care... (album) 2020
  - State of Mind (remix EP featuring remixes by KMFDM and others), 2020
- L.A. Streethawk
  - Something Better (EP), 2019
  - Kiss Me At The Black Hole (single), 2019

==== Leandra ====
- Metamorphine, 2008 (Drakkar Records)
- Isomorphine, 2013 (Drakkar Records)
