= Ftanng! =

FTANNG!
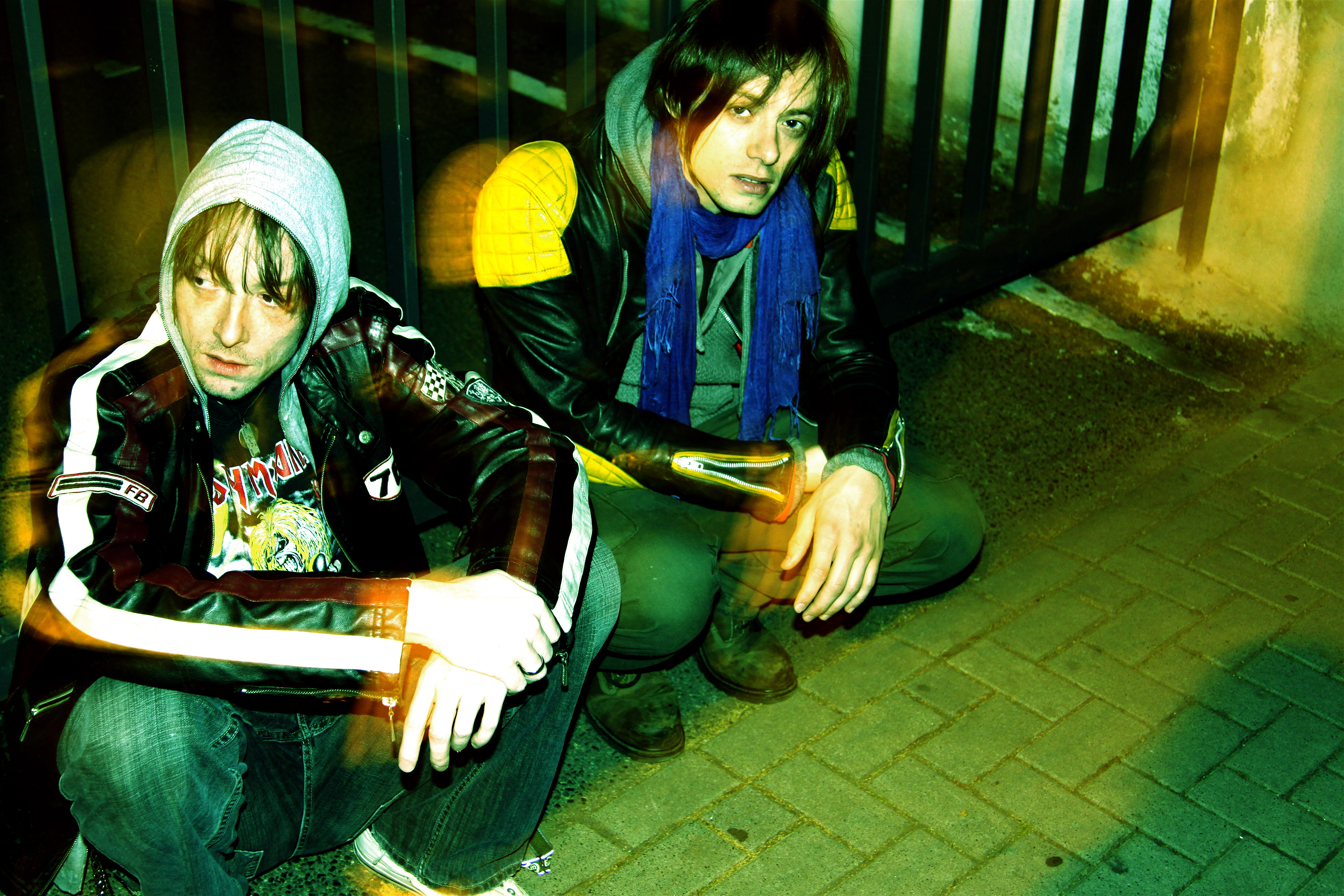
- FTANNG! in Cologne, Germany (2011).

Background information
- Origin: Germany
- Genres: Electronica / alternative rock
- Years active: 2010 – present
- Label: none
- Members: Dorian Deveraux; Pee Wee Vignold
- Website: weareftanng.com

FTANNG! are an electronica / alternative rock duo from Essen and Bochum, Germany. The band was founded by Dorian Deveraux as a solo outlet after his departure from Jesus on Extasy in 2010 and later joined by Pee Wee Vignold (formerly with The Eternal Afflict, Pzychobitch).

The band is following a strict DIY approach, operating outside the traditional music industry structures. Instead, they are giving away their music for free on their website as well as on various other music platforms across the web. In a statement on their website, they explained how they felt the album format has become "useless" to "bands that are new to the scene" and announced to release singles only.

== History ==
On February 2, 2011 the band debuted with their first single King Of My World which was released under a Creative Commons license and can be downloaded from their website for free in 320 kbit/s MP3, 16-bit WAV and 24-bit WAV format. The song was produced with Tim Schuldt at 4CN-Studios. Also released was a remix / mashup kit containing 25 single Stems from the track that still remains available. Subsequently, the song was remixed by Killing The DJ, Our Banshee, Aesthetic Violence, Graveyard Child Escape and MC1R. All remixes have been released for free on the FTANNG! official website.

On April 1, 2011, the band announced having signed to Universal Music for a three-album deal. The supposed debut album King Of My World – The very, very best of FTANNG! was announced to be produced by Butch Vig and Linda Perry and to contain the debut single of the same name in various versions including a version featuring Ke$ha plus a cover version of Star Trekkin' by The Firm. This turned out to be an April Fools Joke to announce to release of their second single Waves which debuted on April 16, 2011 as a roughly cut full-length preview.

Upon their debut the band has received international recognition by the alternative music press as well as radio airplay. To gain further independence from external media outlets the band has invited their fans to a Q&A via their tumblelog on April 17, 2011.

After the release of Waves, the band went on an unannounced two-year hiatus. During the time, the musicians have worked with an independent theater ensemble and provided sound design to a production of the stage play Astoria by Austrian playwright Jura Soyfer, produced music for an unreleased short film and admittedly got creatively stuck over producing a cover version of Once in a Lifetime by Talking Heads. Additionally, Deveraux has worked as an extra on the sets of Lars von Trier's Nymphomaniac as well as of an episode of Schimanski, a spin-off of the long-running German/Austrian/Swiss crime television series Tatort.

In September 2013, FTANNG! returned with the free online release of their third single Meaning in various formats via their website as well as multiple online platforms such as the iTunes Store, AmazonMP3 or Google Play Music. Once again produced at 4CN-Studios by Tim Schuldt it was released in two different versions: a regular version, mastered to achieve maximum loudness on earphone-based mobile devices such as smart phones; plus an audiophile version, mastered for playback on home or car hi-fi systems, which attempts to capture the full dynamic range of the song as experienced in the studio.

== Members ==
- Dorian Deveraux – vocals, bass, guitar, programming, keyboards, synthesizer, percussion
- Pee Wee Vignold – bass, guitar, programming, keyboards, synthesizer, percussion

== Other contributors ==
- Tim Schuldt – guitar, bass
