= Ikon (Australian band) =

Australian gothic rock band

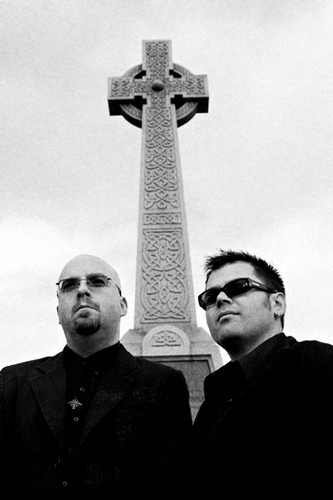
- Ikon in 2006; Left to right: Chris McCarter and Dino Molinaro

Background information
- Origin: Melbourne, Victoria, Australia
- Genres: Gothic rock
- Years active: 1988–present
- Labels: Independent; Echozone; Nile Records
- Members: Chris McCarter
- Past members: Michael Carrodus; Anthony Griffiths; Maurice Molella; Anthony Cornish; David Burns; Clifford Ennis; Dino Molinaro
- Website: Ikon

Ikon are an Australian gothic rock band from Melbourne.

== History ==
Chris McCarter (vocals, guitar, programming) and Dino Molinaro (bass) began to write songs as high school students in 1988, inspired by their love of alternative music.

Originally named "Death in the Dark," the band changed its name in 1991 to Ikon.

The band's original singer Michael Carrodus joined them in creating the first two albums In the Shadow of the Angel (1994) and Flowers for the Gathering (1996), which drew Ikon to the attention of goth music fans in Europe and America through their signing to Apollyon and Metropolis. Music journalist Mick Mercer called them "pioneers in the Gothic genre".

The band continued to evolve in musical style after the departure of Carrodus in 1997. This Quiet Earth (1998) heralded a development in McCarter's musical composition, spawning singles Subversion and Ghost in My Head.

The release of On the Edge of Forever (2001) lead to a return to live performance. Drummer David Burns and guitarist Anthony Griffiths (both of whom joined the band in late-1998) were integral to the development of the album, which abandoned the electronic experimentation of This Quiet Earth and returned to Ikon's original rock genre.

Ikon set out on its first European tour in August 2001. After this tour, the band was invited to play at the M'era Luna festival in 2002, with billing alongside The Sisters of Mercy, HIM, Soft Cell and London After Midnight and then their first of three appearances at Wave Gotik Treffen in 2003.

By 2004, Ikon consisted of original members McCarter and Molinaro, with Clifford Ennis joining the band for the first time. Later that year, the band released the Psychic Vampire EP.

Ikon released LP Destroying the World to Save It, in 2005, which produced chart successes on both the Native 25 (number 21 Best Album of 2005, debut at number 8, May 2005) and DAC (Rome number 10 on the singles chart).

Love, Hate and Sorrow, Ikon's sixth studio album was released in 2009 and spawned four singles, a DVD single and two video clips. Black Magazin (issue 49) named the first single A Line on a Dark Day the second-best track of 2008. The song was also named a semi-finalist in the International Songwriting Competition.

In 2010, Ennis and Burns returned to the band, leading to their 2014 album (Everyone Everything Everywhere Ends) and 2024 album (Realm of the Black Sun).

== Discography ==
=== Albums ===
- Realm of the Black Sun (2024)
- Everyone Everything Everywhere Ends (2014)
- Love, Hate and Sorrow (2009)
- Destroying the World to Save It (2005)
- On the Edge of Forever (2001)
- This Quiet Earth (1998)
- Flowers for the Gathering (1996)
- In the Shadow of the Angel (1994)

=== Compilation albums ===
- The Complete Recordings 1992-1996 (Cleopatra Records USA 4-CD box set 2023)
- The Thirteenth Hour the singles 2007-2020 (Australia 3CD 2020)
- Sketches and Blurred Visions 1991-1993 (2CD/DVD Australia/Germany 2018)
- Like Sounds Through the Hour Glass 1991-2017 (Australia 2016)
- As Time Goes By (The Original Ikon) (Germany 2007)
- The Burden of History the Singles 1992-2007 2CD ( Germany 2007)
- From Angels to Ashes (Australia 2003)
- Dawn of the Ikonoclast 1991-1997 2CD (Germany 1999)
- The Final Experience (Germany 1997 limited edition)
- A Moment in Time ( Germany/USA1995)

=== Singles ===
- "Leviathan's Gate" (digital only single 2024)
- "Bullroarer" (digital only single 2024)
- "Premonition" (digital only single 2024)
- "Candle Ice" (digital only single 2024)
- "Toxicity" (7" single Australia 2022)
- "Silence is Calling" (7" single Australia 2020)
- "A Line on a Dark Day" (7" single Australia 2020)
- "As Time Goes By" (7" single Australia 2018)
- "Gruss Vom Krampus" (7" single Holland 2015)
- "Black Noise" (7"/CD/12" single Australia 2015)
- "Blood of Love" (7"/CD single Australia 2015)
- "Stolen" (7"/CD single Australia 2014)
- "I Burn For You" (7"/CD single Australia 2014)
- "Azkadelia" (7"/CD single USA 2012)
- "Where Do I Go from Here" (7"/CD single Australia 2011)
- "Broken Windows" (12" single/CD single USA 2011)
- "Torn Apart" (7"/CD single Australia 2010)
- "Driftwood" (7"/CD single Australia 2010)
- "Amongst the Runes" (7"/CD single Australia 2008)
- "League of Nations" (CD Australia 2007)
- "Without Shadows" (CD single Australia 2006)
- "Rome" (7"/CD single Germany/Australia 2005)
- "Death by Dawn" (7" single Germany 2005)
- "I Never Wanted You" ( 7"/CD single Australia 2004)
- "Psychic Vampire" (7"/CD single Australia/Germany/Russia 2004)
- "Ceremony" (CD single Australia 2003)
- "Afterlife" (7"/CD single Australia 2002)
- "Blue Snow Red Rain" (7"/10" single Germany 2001))
- "The Shallow Sea(7"/CD single Germany 2000)
- "Lifeless" (7"/CD single Germany 1999)
- "Reality Is Lost" (CD single 1999)
- "Ghost in My Head" (7"/CD single Australia/Germany 1998)
- "Subversion" (7"/CD single Germany/USA 1998)
- "Life Without End" (CD single Germany 1996)
- "In a Lonely Place" (CD single Germany 1995)
- "Condemnation" (7" single Germany 1995)
- "The Echoes of Silence" (7"/CD single Australia 1993)
- "Why" (7" single Australia 1992)

== Members ==
=== Current members ===
- Chris McCarter (vocals, guitars, programming)

=== Former members ===
- Michael Aliani (a.k.a. Carrodus) (vocals)
- Anthony Griffiths (guitars, vocals)
- Valerios Calocerinos (bass)
- Maurice Molella (drums)
- Anthony Cornish (guitar)
- David Burns (drums)
- Clifford Ennis (vocals, guitar)
- Dino Molinaro (bass)
