= Weena Morloch =

German electronic music project

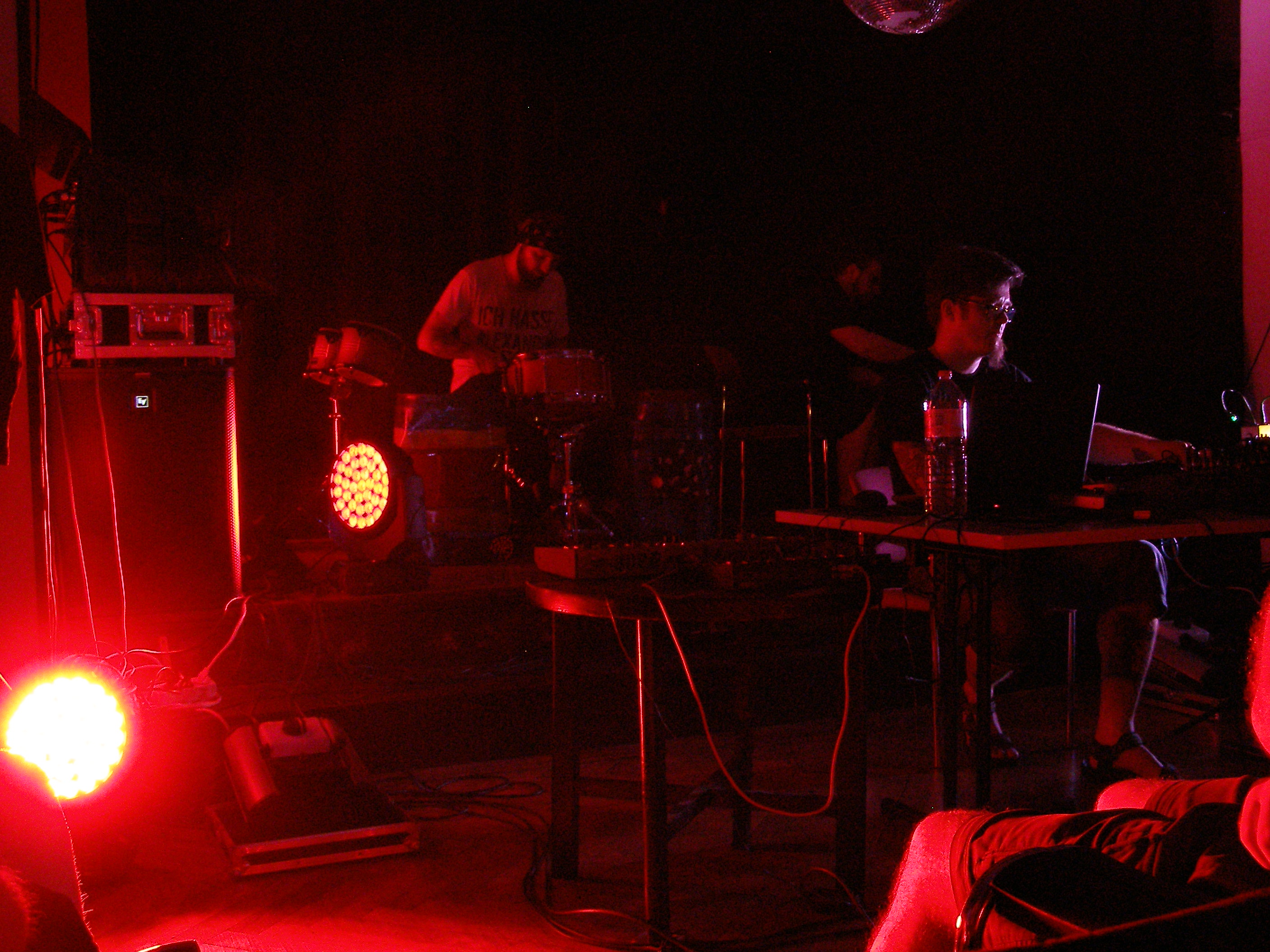
- Weena Morloch in 2013

Background information
- Origin: Germany
- Genres: Noise, electronic music, industrial metal
- Years active: 1996–present
- Label: Trisol
- Website: weena-morloch.de

Weena Morloch is a German electronic music project by Samsas Traum frontman Alexander Kaschte. The name Weena Morloch came from the H. G. Wells book The Time Machine ("Weena" is the name of the girl that the unnamed male protagonist develops a close loving relationship with in the future world he travels to, and the name "Morloch" is derived from the Morlocks, the cannibalistic hominids).

== Biography ==
Weena's first album, Kunst-X=?, was released in 2001. The music was called 'Horror noise Industrial' because music was noise-music orientated and it featured samples from various horror movies (one familiar one being from the movie Phantasm). The album was not well received by the press, and suffered from poor record sales. After taking a year off to concentrate releasing more material under the Samsas Traum name, Kaschte released a follow-up, the more industrial-dance inspired Kadaverkomplex, in 2002. There was some minor controversy because of the rather disturbing pictures of Alexander covered in blood (the CD initially came with sticker saying the images inside the album were not suitable for minors) and according to earlier version of the Weena Morloch website, the album had been banned in Germany. But, apart from the minor controversy, Kadaverkomplex was a better-crafted album and was more successful, as it was best known for the single Kugel im Gesicht (9 mm) which is often played as the last song at Samsas Traum concerts.

There was a nod to the earlier Kunst material though, such as the eerie "Terror über alles", which was a noise-music take on the events of 11 September, and "Weena Morlock (Der Grammophon – Song)", which took samples from The Time Machine movie, and the beat was entirely composed using a gramophone. According to after Weena Morloch released the EP Epalanepsis the group is currently on hiatus, so Alexander can continue on with Samsas Traum.

== Discography ==
=== Albums ===
- 2000: Kunst-X=?
- 2002: Kadaverkomplex
- 2011: Amok
- 2015: Grüss Gott, wir sind die Morlochs

=== Singles ===
- 2010: "Ein Lied, dich zu töten"

=== EPs ===
- 2003: Trauma 7 EP (as a part of the bonus CD of the Samsas Traum album Tineoidea)
- 2005: Epanalepsis EP

== See also ==
- Samsas Traum
