= Sieben (album) =

2022 studio album by Schwarzer Engel

Studio album by Schwarzer Engel
- Released: 7 January 2022
- Genre: Gothic metal; Neue Deutsche Härte
- Length: 42:58
- Label: Massacre
- Producer: Dave Jason

Schwarzer Engel chronology
Kult der Krähe (2018)	Sieben (2022)

Sieben (German for "Seven") is the seventh studio album by German gothic metal band Schwarzer Engel. It was released on 7 August 2022 via independent label Massacre Records. The album was originally slated for a 2020 release, but was pushed back due to the COVID-19 pandemic.

== Reception ==
The album was received with generally positive reviews from critics. Paul M of European magazine Time for Metal gave the album an 8/10, commenting that the album is "full of feeling" (voller Gefühle), and that "you won't get bored either" (wird einem auch nicht langweilig). Jannik Kleeman writing for German webzine metal.de commented that Schwarzer Engel manages to "implement the sometimes quite striking themes so atmospherically that you can lose yourself in the melodies while listening" (die teilweise recht plakativen Themen so stimmungsvoll umzusetzen, dass man sich beim Hören in den Melodien verlieren kann).

== Track listing ==
All lyrics are written by Dave Jason.

No.	Title	English translation	Length
1.	"VII"		2:09
2.	"Kreuziget mich"	Crucify Me	3:19
3.	"Teufel"	Devil	3:49
4.	"Paradies"	Paradise	4:11
5.	"Ewig leben"	Eternal Life	3:31
6.	"Wie viele Jahre"	How Many Years	4:25
7.	"Schlitzer"	Slasher	4:04
8.	"Vollmond"	Full Moon	5:20
9.	"Ring frei"	Ring Free	3:42
10.	"Schönheit"	Beauty	4:17
11.	"Endzeit"	End Times	4:11
Total length:			42:58

== Charts ==
Chart	Peak position
German Albums (Offizielle Top 100)	59
