= Versengold =

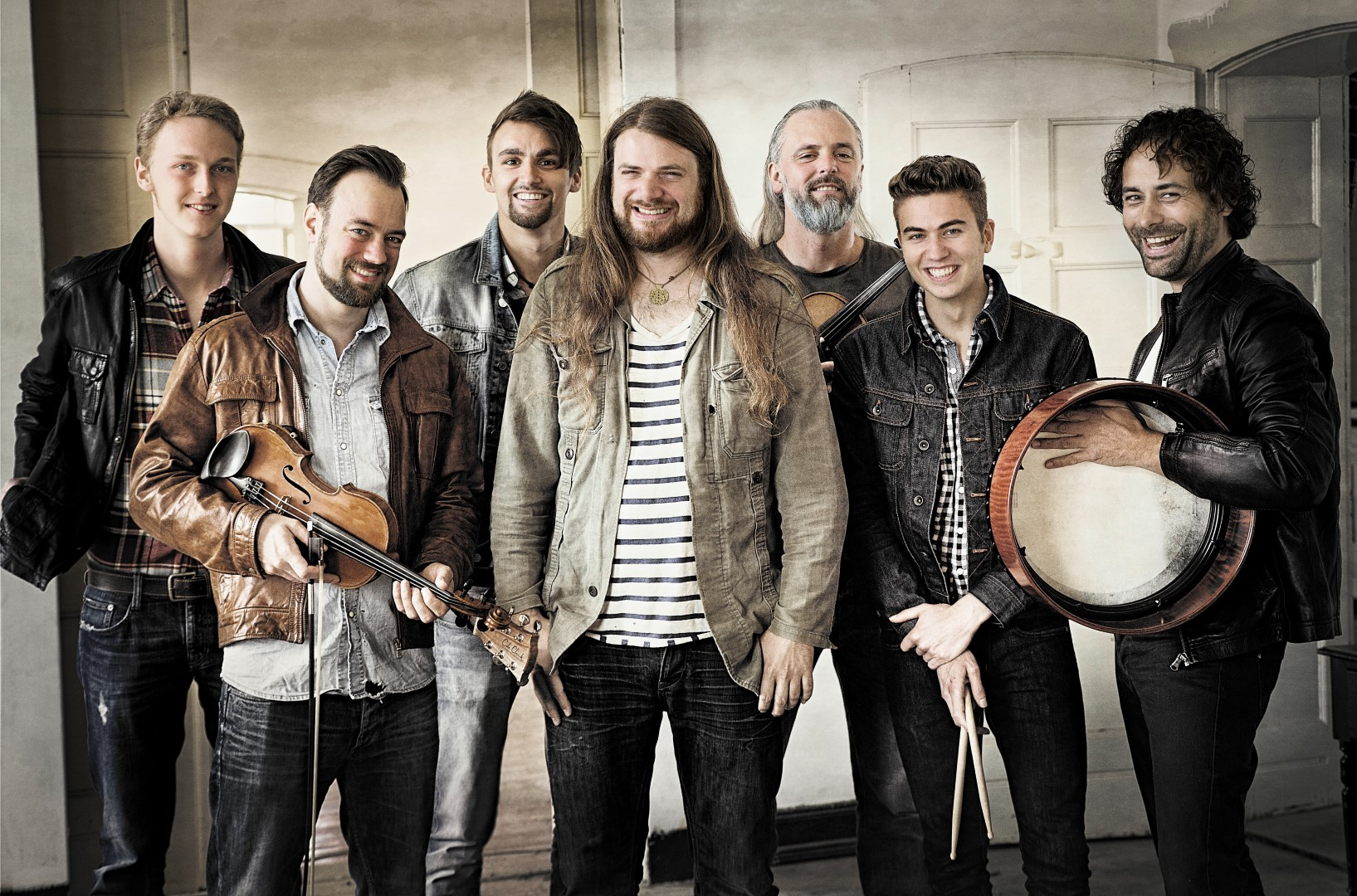

Background information
- Genres: Pagan rock Folk rock Medieval rock
- Years active: 2003–present
- Labels: RCA Deutschland, Fuedo, Totentanz Records
- Website: www.versengold.com

Versengold is a German folk rock band formed in 2003. The originality of their music style is that they combine historical texts with modern folk elements. With eleven albums released so far, they have become an integral part of the German folk scene.

== History ==
Versengold was founded in 2003 by the singer Malte Hoyer in his hometown Osterholz-Scharmbeck. The band, originally formed as a hobby project, mainly consisted of the founding duo Carolin Fährmann and Malte Hoyer, who at the time also played the cittern and the hurdy-gurdy, together with the percussionist Jan Schröder and the violinist Arndt Rathien. The quartet's content and music were mainly geared towards LARP and medieval reenactment. On 14 October 2005, the debut album Hoerensagen was released. On the second album Allgebraeu, published on 15 April 2006, Thomas Heuer was already present as a featured artist. For the 2008 season, Jan Schröder and Arndt Rathjen left the band and on 21 May 2008 the album Ketzerey was released, with percussionist Thomas Heuer and violinist Alexander Willms. After the album was completed, Carolin Fährmann also left the band and the female soprano role was taken by the guest artists Martje Saljé (vocals and guitar) and Maren-Mechthild Meyer-Wünsch (vocals, cittern, flutes, bodhrán). The three remaining band members Hoyer, Heuer and Willms therefore decided to dissolve the band and publish one last album as an all male trio. During the production, Florian Janoske and Daniel Gregory joined as guest musicians. In this line-up, the band released the album Dreck am Stecken on 18 January 2011. Subsequently, Janoske and Gregory became full members and the band continued playing as a pure male quintet.

The band professionalized over the years and its style also transformed, first including Celtic elements, later with rock and folk moving more into the center. Immediately after Versengold's performance at Wacken Open Air 2013, the band released the album Im Namen des Folkes on 4 August 2013. On 31 August 2013 Versengold played together with Die Kammer, Lyriel and Fiddler's Green in an opening act for Schandmaul in front of 10,000 visitors.

In 2015, Sean Lang and Eike Otten joined the band, on the drums and on the bass respectively. The album Zeitlos, released in this line-up, rose to 22nd place on the German album charts and was subsequently presented in an accompanying club tour. In addition to another appearance at Wacken Open Air, the band played at other festivals, including Summer Breeze, Rockharz, M'era Luna Festival, Open Flair and Greenfield. In the same year, the band published its first live album Live 2015. In 2016 the DVD Live in Hamburg, recorded at the Hamburg Gruenspan, was released, featuring Katja Moslehner.

In 2017 the album Funkenflug was published and reached second place of the German album charts, constituting the greatest success of the band to date. In the same year, Thomas "Pinto" Heuer left the band. On 26 and 27 October 2018, Versengold celebrated its 15-year anniversary with two concerts in Hamburg with 3,500 visitors at the Große Freiheit 36, to which a series of guests including Schandmaul and Subway to Sally also took part. The concert was recorded and released as a limited fan box on Blu-Ray.

In 2019, the band released the album Nordlicht. In 2022 the album Was kost die Welt was published, which reached first place in the German album charts.

On 3 November 2023, Versengold released its new album Lautes Gedenken and celebrated its 20-year anniversary the following day with around 10,000 fans in the Barclays Arena in Hamburg.

On 9 January 2026, Versengold released their most recent album Eingenordet.

== Repertoire and style ==
The lyrics written by Malte Hoyer often tell stories with many possible interpretations. The band's repertoire ranges from pure instrumentals to drinking songs (e.g. Einerley or Hoch die Krüge), ballads like Vom Zauber des Wildfräuleins and socially critical songs such as Punsch statt Putsch.

Since the entry of Sean Lang and Eike Otten in 2015 and the influence of their instruments (drums and bass), a significant change in style can be observed, which is also reflected in the lyrics. The album Zeitlos of that year can be seen as a turning point from which elements and contents more typical of pop music have increasingly played a role. For some time, the current band members have also been performing under their real names, rather than under medieval-looking pseudonyms.

== Members ==
Versengold, Line-Up at Rockharz 2018

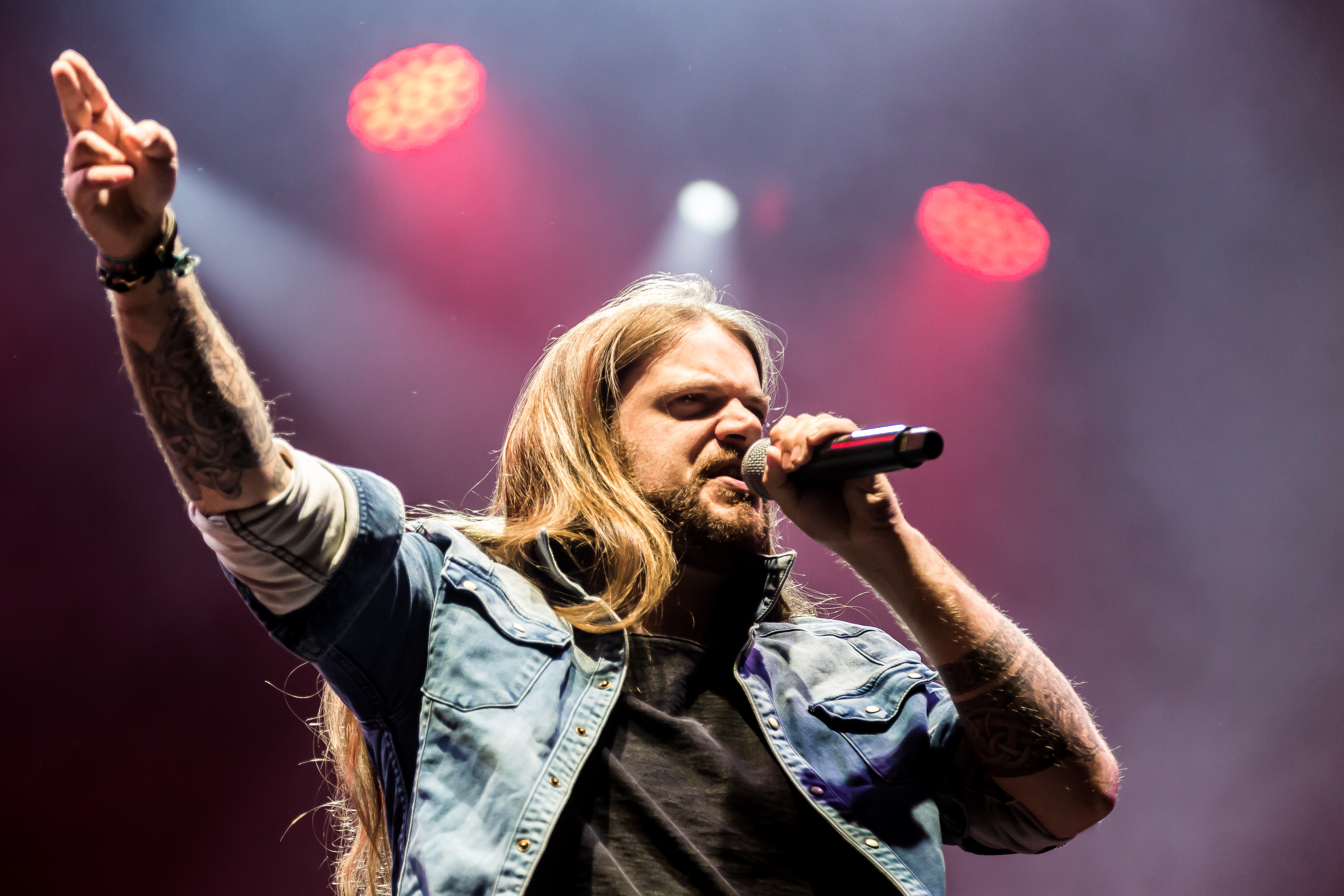
Singer Malte Hoyer

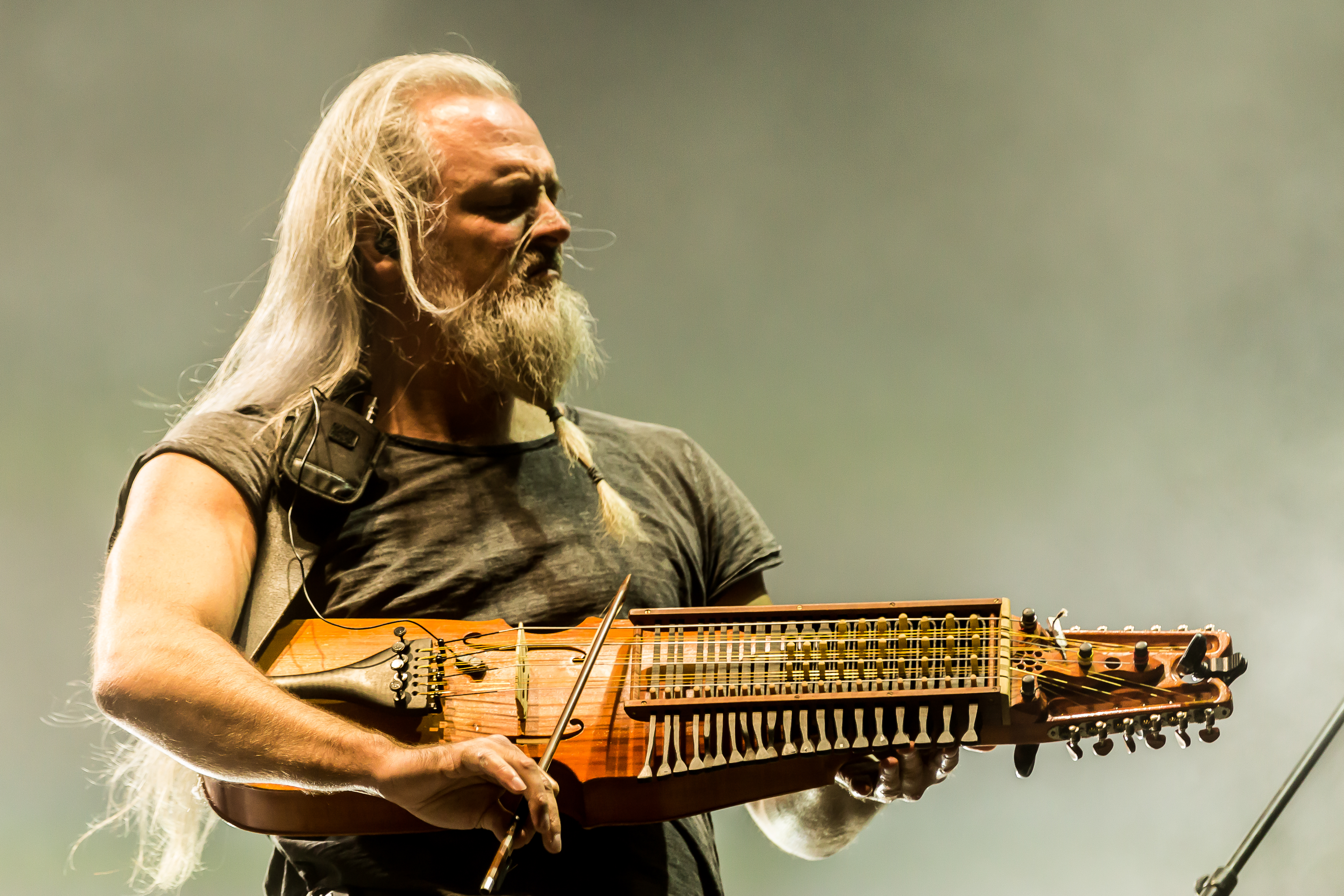
Violinist Alexander Willms

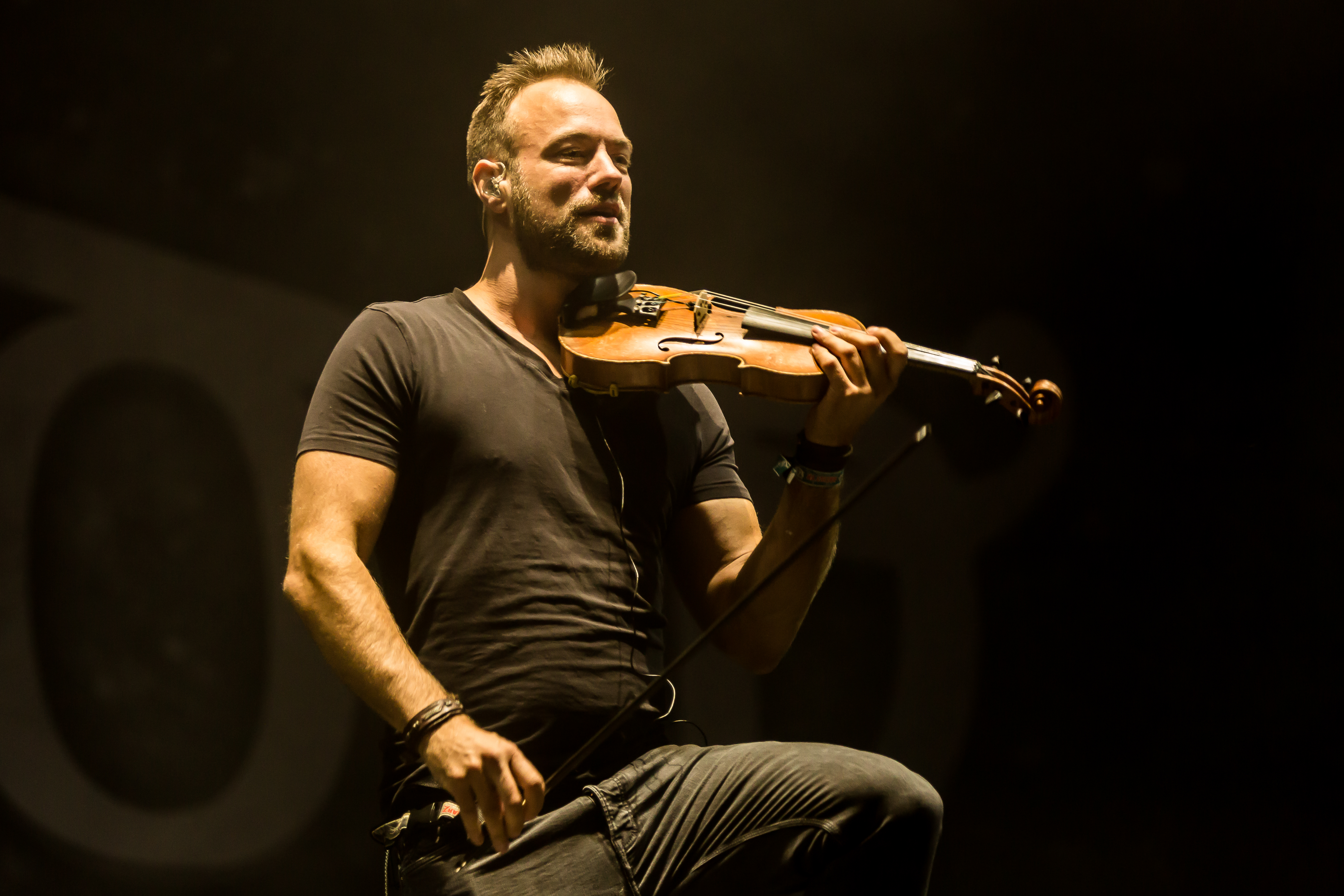
Violinist Florian Janoske

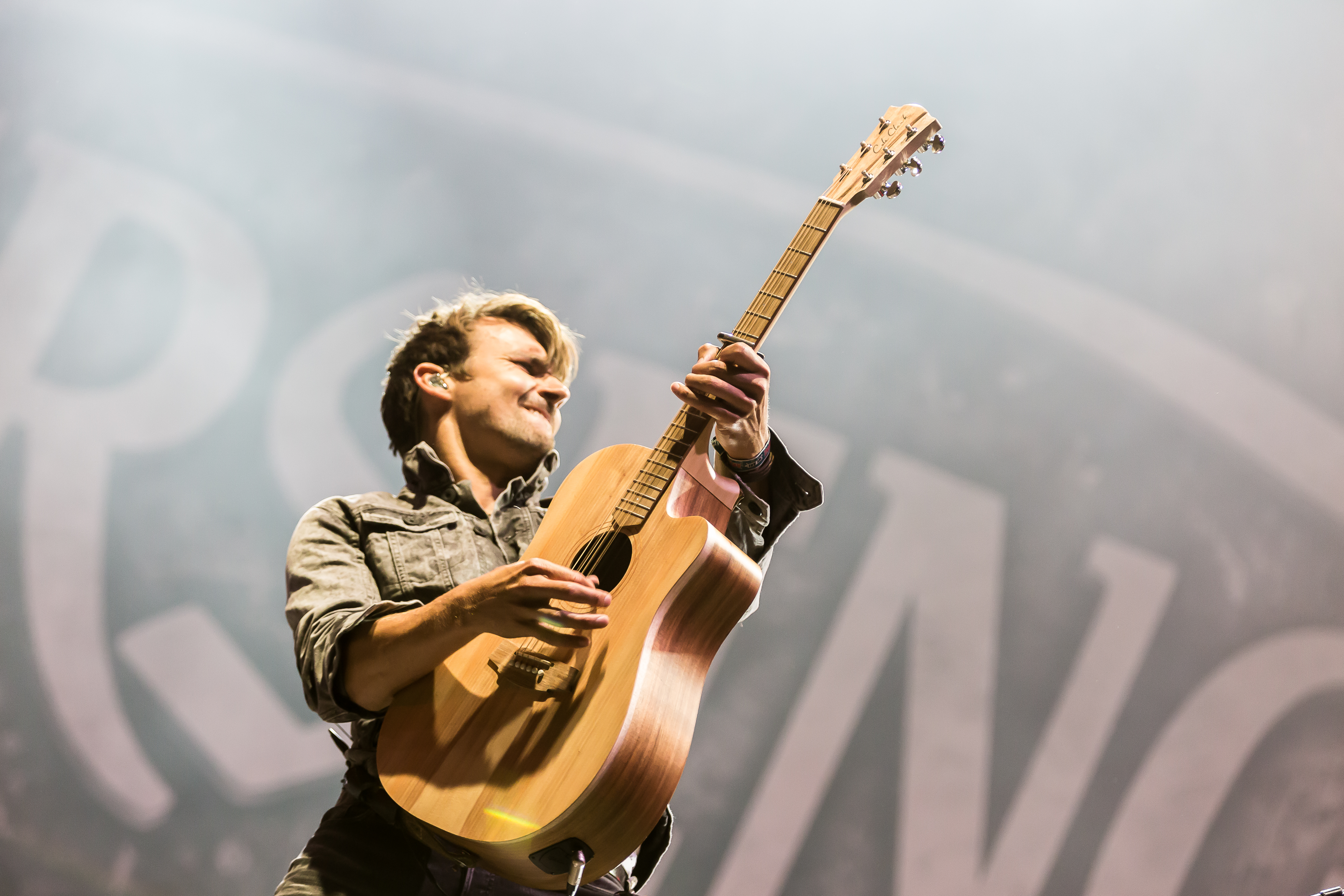
Guitarist Daniel Gregory

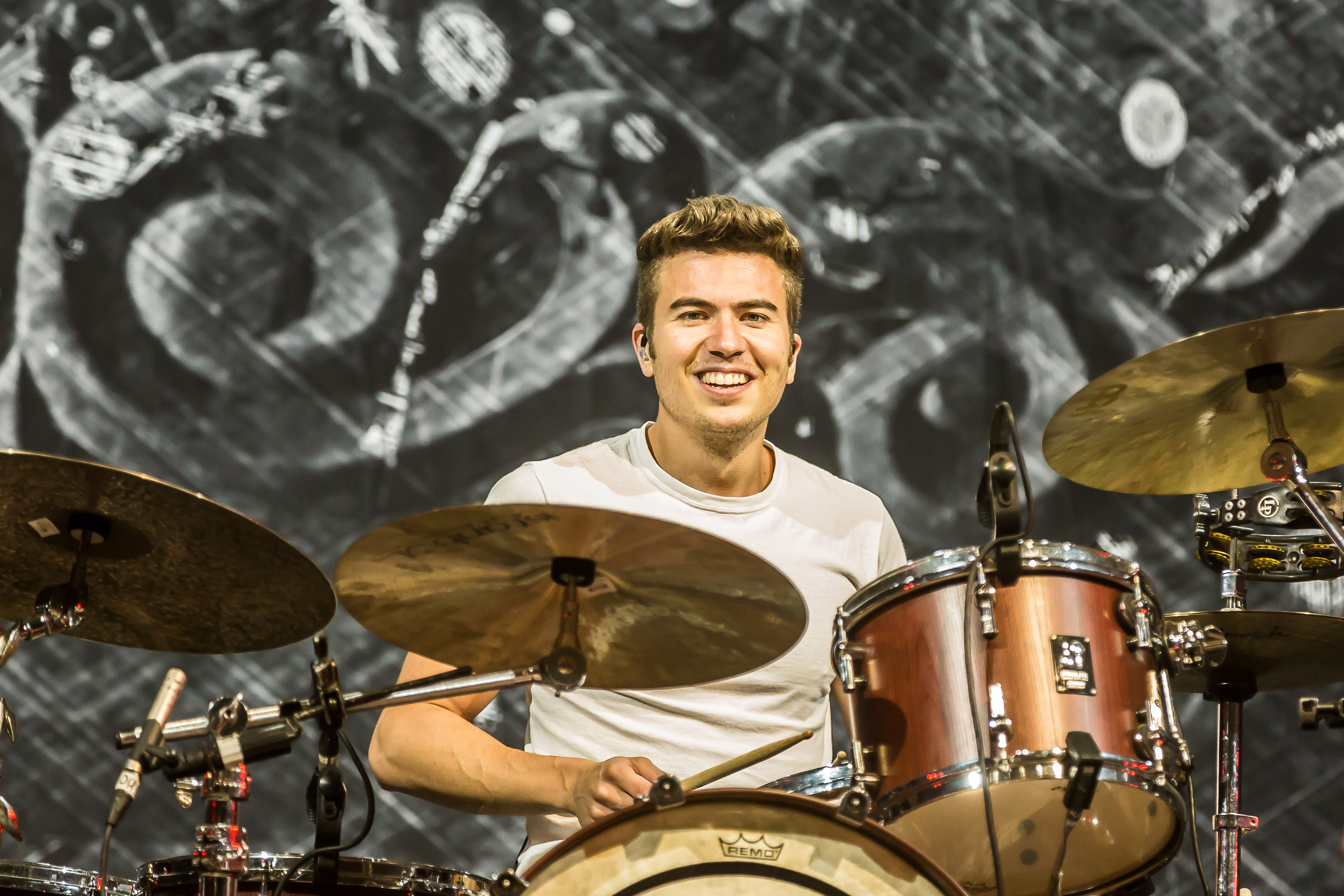
Drummer Sean Lang

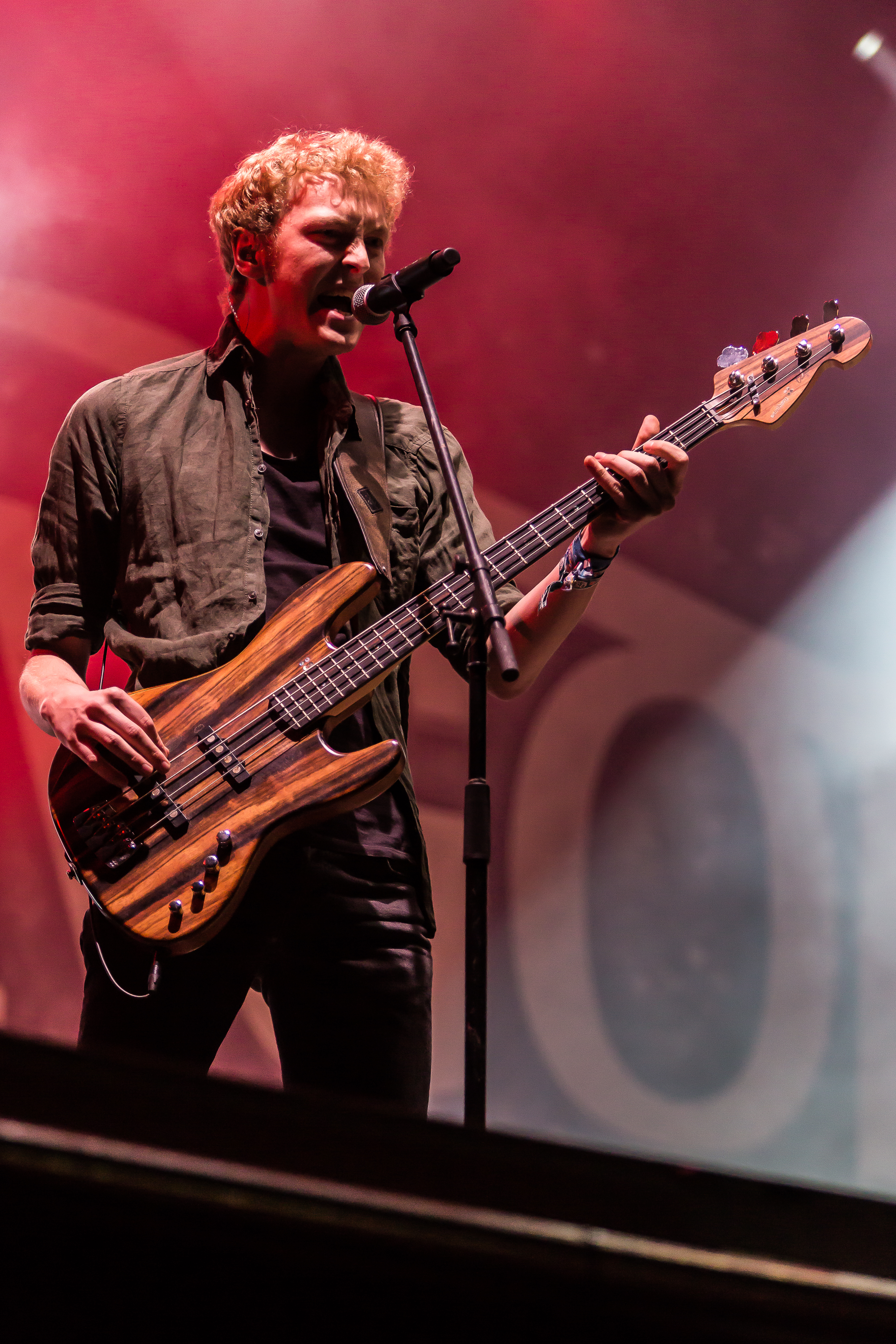
Bassist Eike Otten

== Discography ==
Year	Title	Peak chart positions			
Year	Title	GER	AUT	NED	SWI
2005	Hoerensagen	—	—	—	—
2006	Allgebraeu	—	—	—	—
2008	Ketzerey	—	—	—	—
2011	Dreck am Stecken	—	—	—	—
2013	Im Namen des Folkes	—	—	—	—
2014	Auf in den Wind	—	—	—	—
2015	Zeitlos	22	—	—	—
2015	Live 2015	—	—	—	—
2017	Funkenflug	2	52	—	41
2019	Nordlicht	4	27	—	25
2022	Was kost die Welt	1	23	—	20
2023	Lautes Gedenken	2	26	—	60
2026	Eingenordet	1	15	—	23

== Trivia ==
Malte Hoyer, Florian Janoske and Daniel Gregory also played in the band Knasterbart.

Tjalf Hoyer, Malte Hoyer's brother, is the singer in the Bremen band Afterburner.

Since 2014, Versengold has appeared in the videogame The Guild 2, where it plays three of its songs in various inns by making a guest appearance in them once in a while.

The album Funkenflug is heavily influenced by a previous serious car accident involving Hoyer.

On 19 July 2017, together with Schandmaul and Mr. Hurley & die Pulveraffen, Versengold organized a live streaming concert, where each band covered a song of the other two.

On 10 September 2017, the band performed at the ZDF-Fernsehgarten.

Eike Otten also performs as Purple Otten.

On 23 May 2020, as well as on 11 July, 21 August, 31 October and 31 December, the band, unable to perform due to the COVID-19 pandemic, organized online live concerts. In 2021 they played three more of these concerts. On 29 January 2022 there was an online release concert for the album Was kost die Welt.
