= Then Comes Silence =

Swedish gothic rock and post-punk band

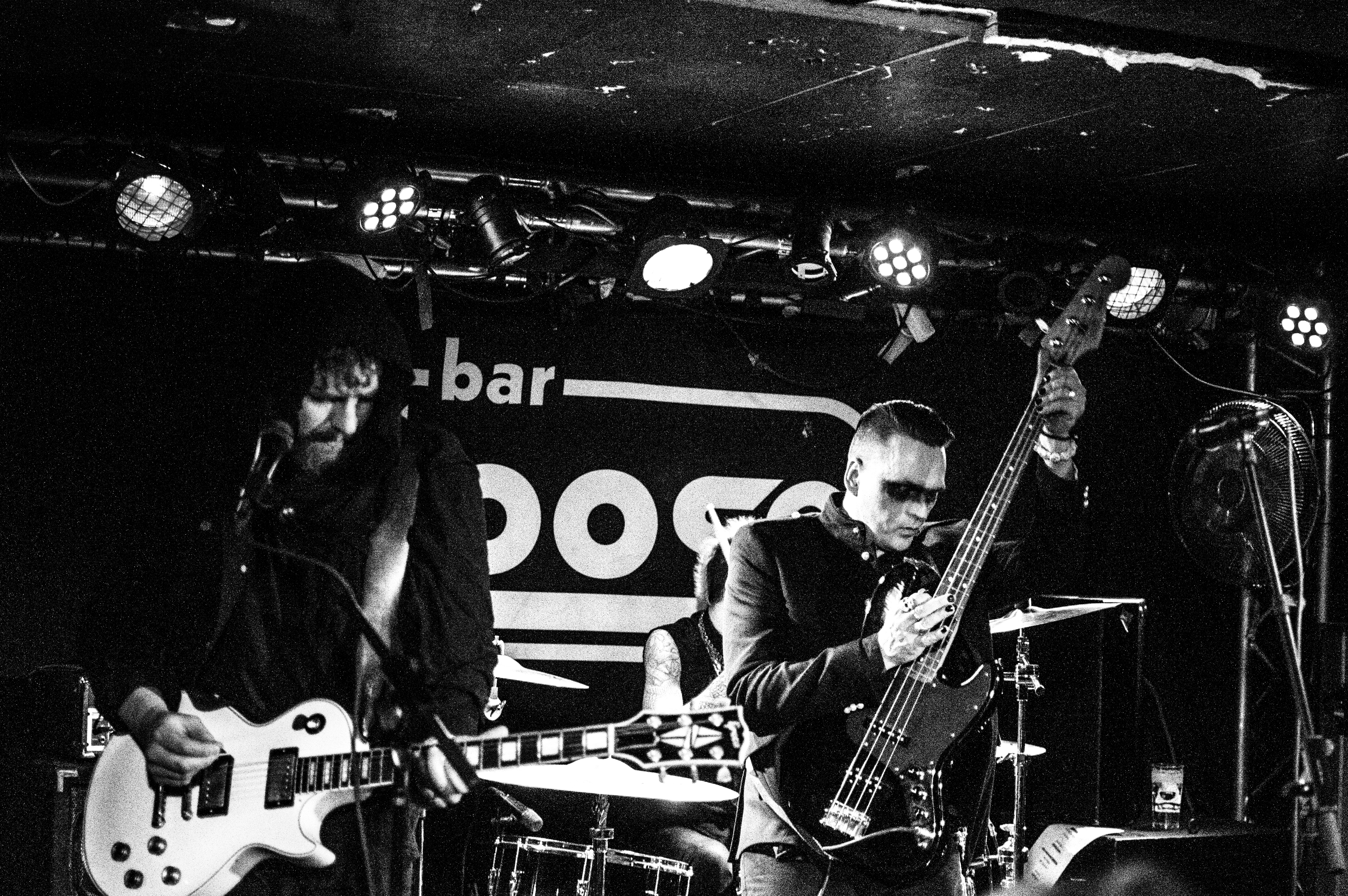
Then Comes Silence in Helsinki 2017

Then Comes Silence are a Swedish gothic rock and post-punk band, formed in 2012 in Stockholm. Their music draws inspiration from horror and spiritism.

== Band history ==
The band came together in 2012. They released three albums on the Novoton label: Their debut self-titled album Then Comes Silence and its follow-up, Then Comes Silence II and third album Nyctophilian.

In 2016, the group signed a contract with the German record label Nuclear Blast, and on October 20, 2017, they released their fourth full-length album, Blood.

The fifth album, Machine, was released on March 13, 2020, the same day much of Europe entered lockdown due to the COVID-19 pandemic.

The band performed at the Roskilde Festival in 2013 and regularly tours in Europe. In 2018, Then Comes Silence opened for Fields of The Nephilim and Chameleons Vox.

== Members ==
Current members

- Alex Svenson-Metés – bass, lead vocals, keyboards (2012–present)
- Jonas Fransson – drums, backing vocals (2015–present)
- Hugo Zombie – guitars (2018–present)

Former members

- Karl Nilsson – drums (2013–2015)
- Seth Kapadia – guitars (2012–2018)
- Jens Karnstedt – guitars (2013–2018)
- Mattias Ruejas Jonson – guitars (2018–2023)

== Discography ==
Studio albums

- 2012 – Then Comes Silence (Novoton Novo037)
- 2013 – Then Comes Silence II (Novoton Novo045)
- 2015 – Nyctophilian (Novoton NOVOCD055)
- 2017 – Blood (Nuclear Blast)
- 2020 – Machine (Metropolis/SPV)
- 2022 – Hunger (Nexilis/Schubert)
- 2024 – Trickery (Metropolis)

Singles

- 2013 – Can't Hide (Novoton)
- 2014 – She Lies in Wait (Novoton)
- 2014 – Spinning Faster (Novoton)
- 2015 – She Loves the Night (Novoton)
- 2015 – Animals (Novoton)
- 2016 – Strangers (Novoton)
- 2017 – The Dead Cry for No One (Nuclear Blast)
- 2017 – Strange Kicks (Nuclear Blast)
- 2017 – Good Friday (Nuclear Blast)
- 2020 – We Lose the Night (Metropolis/SPV)
- 2020 – Ritual (Metropolis/SPV)
