= Schwarzer Engel =

German metal band

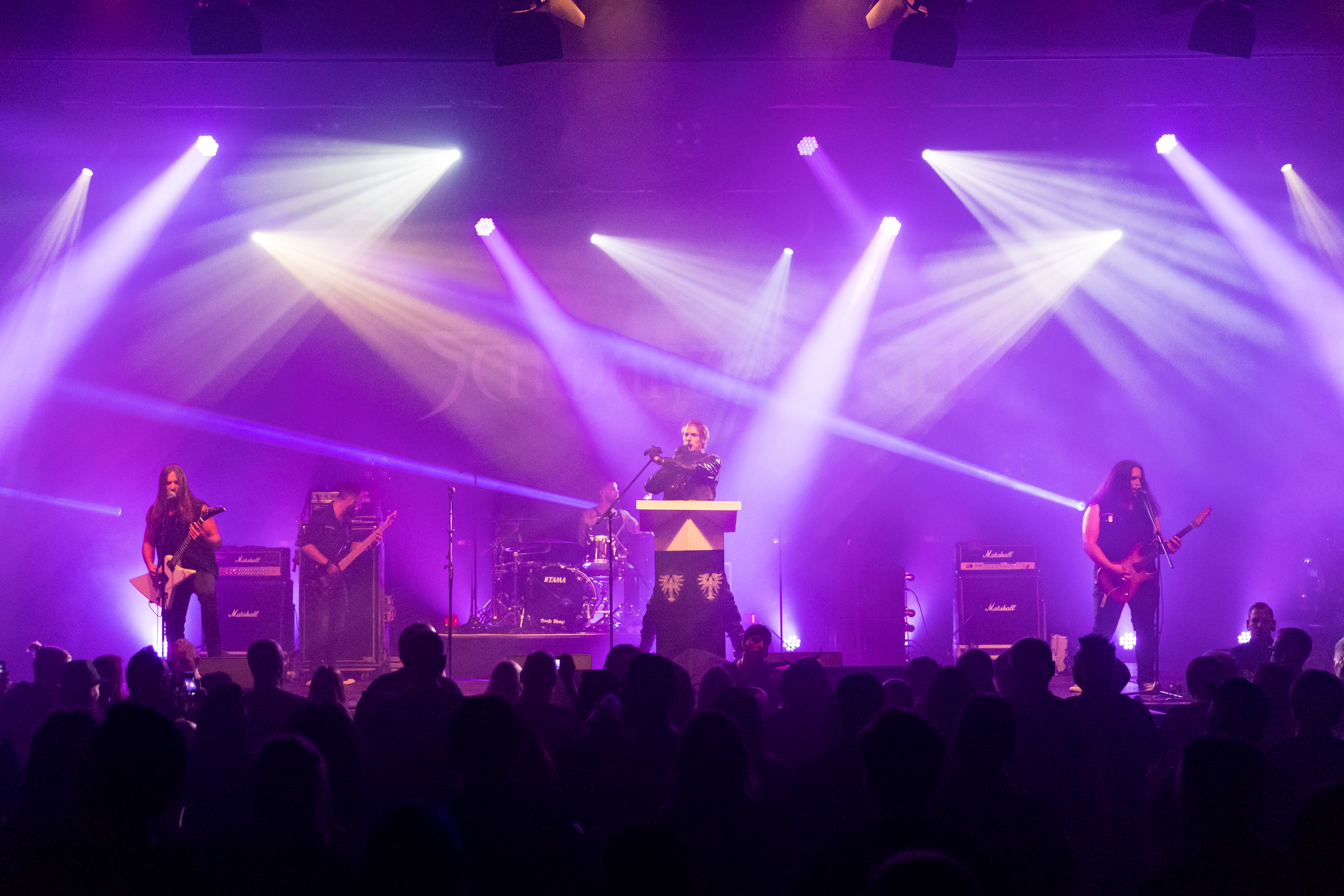
- Schwarzer Engel at Black Castle Festival 2018

Background information
- Origin: Stuttgart, Germany
- Genres: Gothic metal; Neue Deutsche Härte; symphonic metal
- Years active: 2007–present
- Members: Vincent Hübsch; Timo Joos; Bert Oeler; Ben Hell; Marcel Woitowicz; Stefan Dittrich
- Website: schwarzerengel.info

Schwarzer Engel is a German gothic metal project of musician/singer Dave Jason, formed in 2007. They have released eight full-length albums as of October 2024. Their seventh studio album, Sieben, is their first album to make the German official charts, landing at 59th for a week.

== Members ==
- Dave Jason – vocals, guitar, drums
- Vincent Hübsch – guitar (live)
- Timo Joos – guitar (live)
- Bert Oeler – bass (live)
- Tino Calmbach – drums (live)

== Discography ==
=== Studio albums ===
- Apokalypse (2010)
- Träume einer Nacht (2011)
- In brennenden Himmeln (2013)
- Imperium I (2015)
- Imperium II (2016)
- Kult der Krähe (2018)
- Sieben (2022)
- Höhere Gewalt (2024)
