= Samsas Traum =

German metal band

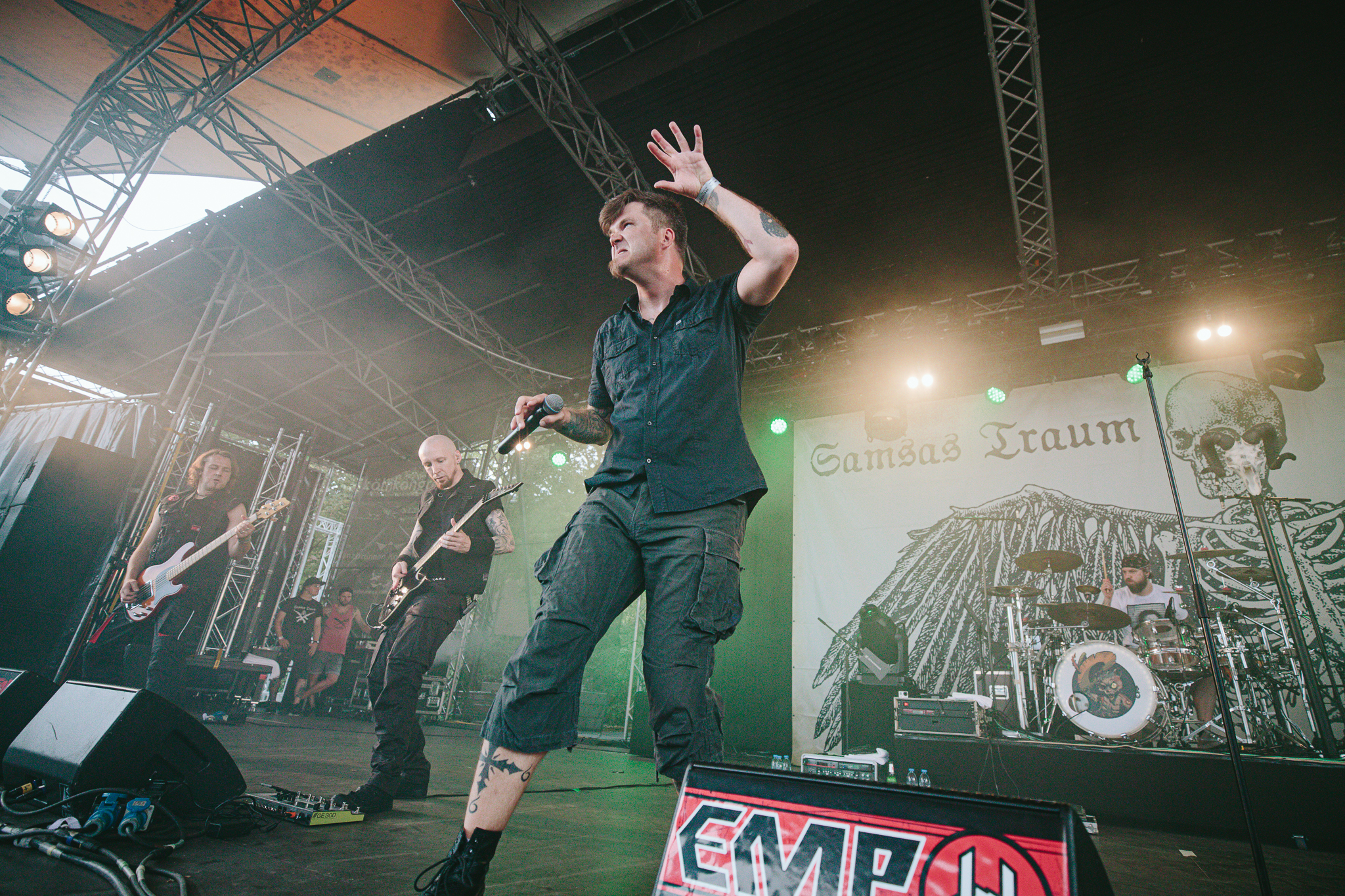
- Samsas Traum in 2019

Background information
- Origin: Germany
- Genres: Gothic metal, symphonic metal, symphonic black metal, industrial metal
- Years active: 1996–present
- Labels: Trisol
- Members: Alexander Kaschte (vocals & programming); Michael Beck (drums)
- Past members: Daniel Schröder (bass clarinet & saxophone); Alisa Kaschte (choir); Annabelle Kaschte (choir); Simone Stahl (choir); Eva Stahl (choir); Karsten Sommer (choir); Johannes Welsch (choir); Lena Graulich (choir); Lydia Budnick (choir); Jochen Interthal (guitar); Matthias Fischer (bass)
- Website: samsas-traum.info

Samsas Traum ("Samsa's Dream") is a German band fronted by Alexander Kaschte. Their music consists of elements of gothic metal, symphonic metal, industrial metal, black metal and cantastoria. The name is derived from the protagonist Gregor Samsa in Kafka's The Metamorphosis (1915).

== Biography ==
Samsas Traum started in 1996 when Kaschte released his first solo tape. Three years later the solo project became a group of three, and their official debut Die Liebe Gottes – Eine märchenhafte Black Metal Operette (The Love of God – A fairy tale-like black metal Operetta) divided the scene. Some people said that ST was the best newcomer of the year, other people rather started to hate them, at least also because of some provocative statements by Alexander Kaschte. The follow-up appeared in 2000 with Oh Luna mein (O, Luna mine); a musically matured and varied album of more polished arrangements, balanced instrumentation and choir-parts. In this time Alexander went on to create his darker alter-ego Weena Morloch, which was more noise music based, and included samples from horror movies. Many more Samsas Traum albums have been released each year, with more industrial/classical arrangements. The two new albums which have been released in November 2007 were also heading new and old ways: While the first album Heiliges Herz – Das Schwert Deiner Sonne was most likely a Black Metal-Epos, Wenn schwarzer Regen was an acoustic and very personal one.

The limited first edition of Heiliges Herz ("Sacred Heart") came in a special book format and a slipcase with silver foil embossing. The 44 booklet pages were bound in linen and made of a special paper with a lacquer print and contained lyrics, liner notes, many photos illustrations exclusively done for the album. Additionally there was a bonus CD which contained remixes by In Strict Confidence, L'Âme Immortelle, Pain, P·A·L, Wumpscut and unreleased songs and material from Alexander Kaschte's archives.

== Discography ==
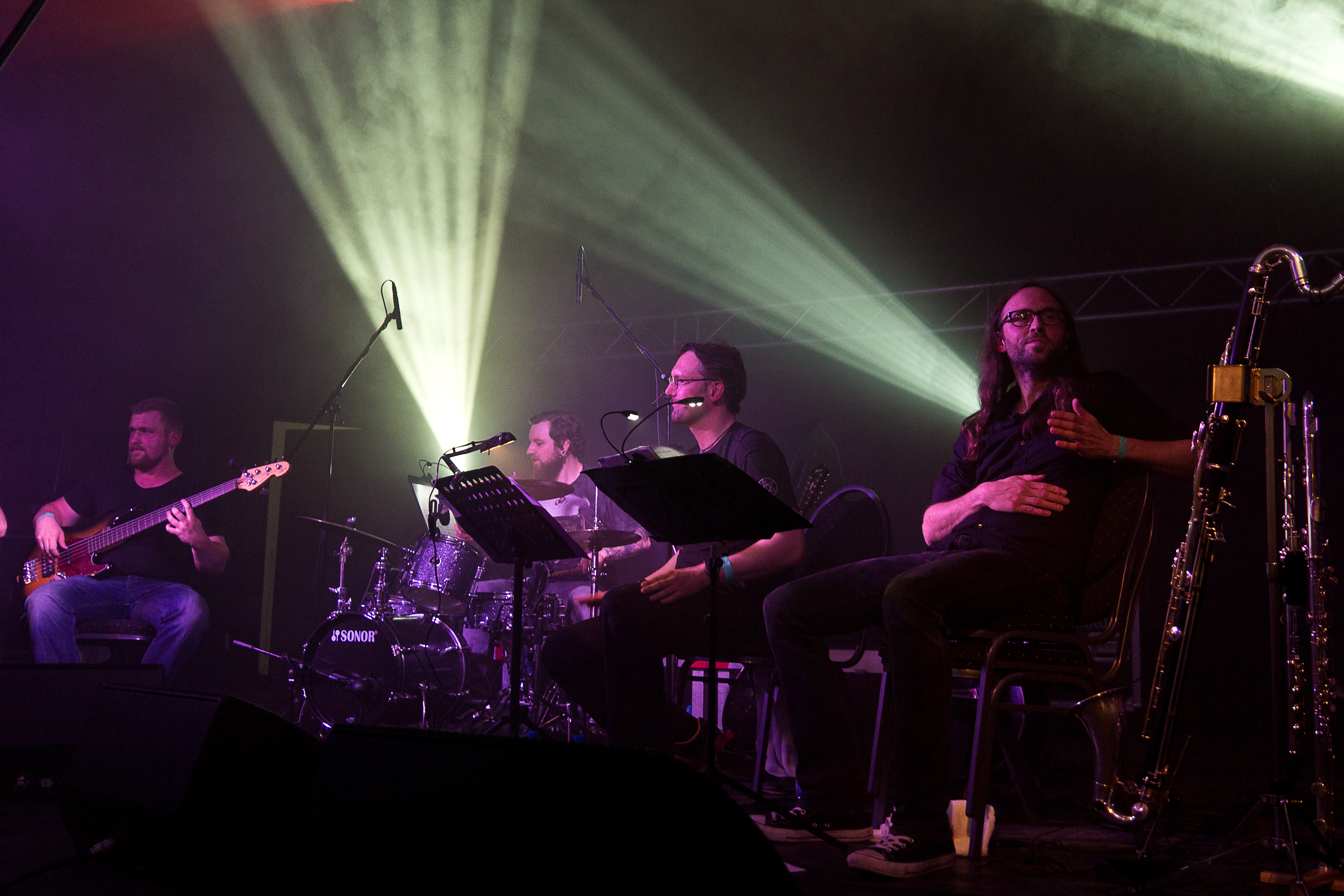
Samsas Traum at the 2015 Wave-Gotik-Treffen

=== Demos ===
- 1996: Kazanian "Die drei Mütter" / Samsas Traum "Nostalgische Atavismen" (demo tape)
- 1996: Homerecordings (second demo)
- 1998: Elite (third demo)
- 1998: Einblick in ein elitäres Debüt-Album (fourth demo)
- 1999: Wiederveröffentlichung von Kazanian "Die drei Mütter" / Samsas Traum "Nostalgische Atavismen" (re-release)

=== Albums ===
- 1999: Die Liebe Gottes – Eine märchenhafte Black Metal Operette (Trinity)
- 2000: Oh Luna Mein (Trisol)
- 2001: Utopia (Trisol)
- 2003: Tineoidea oder: Die Folgen einer Nacht – Eine Gothic-Oper in Blut-Moll (Trisol; includes bonus CD)
- 2004: a.Ura und das Schnecken.Haus (Trisol; DoCD)
- 2005: re-releases of "Die Liebe Gottes", "Oh Luna Mein", "Utopia" and "Tineoidea" (DoCDs)
- 2007: Heiliges Herz – Das Schwert Deiner Sonne (Trisol; DoCD)
- 2007: Wenn schwarzer Regen (Trisol; DoCD)
- 2009: 13 Jahre lang dagegen – Anti bis zum Tod (Trisol)
- 2010: Vernunft ist nichts – Gefühl ist alles (Trisol; 3CD+DVD)
- 2011: Anleitung zum Totsein (Trisol; DoCD)
- 2012: Asen'ka – ein Märchen für Kinder und solche, die es werden wollen (Trisol; DoCD)
- 2013: Niemand, niemand anderem als dir (Trisol; DoCD)
- 2015: Poesie: Friedrichs Geschichte (Trisol; DoCD)
- 2018: Scheiden tut weh (Trisol)

=== Singles ===
- 2005: Einer gegen Alle (Trisol; promo single)
- 2007: Heiliges Herz (Trisol, promo single)

=== EPs ===
- 2002: Ipsissima Verba (Trisol; EP)
- 2012: Viva Vienna Vol. I (Trisol; EP)
- 2015: Wie das ewige Meer (Trisol; EP)

=== Best of ===
- 2004: Endstation.Eden (Trisol; single/best-of with bonus CD)

=== Compilations ===
- 2001: Nostalgia (Trisol; old album with demo material)
- 2003: Arachnoidea oder: Von Babalon, Scheiterhaufen und Zerstörungswut – Eine Apokalypse in 23 Tagen (Trisol; remix album of "Tineoidea" with bonus CD)

=== DVDs ===
- 2005: Einer gegen Alle (Trisol; DoDVD & DoCD)

=== Cover versions ===
The band has covered many songs, including:

- "Alice" by The Sisters of Mercy
- "Gefallen" by L'Âme Immortelle
- "Hier kommt Alex" by Die Toten Hosen
- "Schwarz" by ASP
- "Terra Titanic" by Peter Schilling
- "In the Year 2525" by Zager and Evans

== See also ==
- Weena Morloch
