= Zillo =

German alternative music magazine

Zillo (or Zillostrierte) was a German alternative music magazine, published monthly, originally edited by Rainer "Easy" Ettler. It was in circulation between 1989 and 2014. The headquarters of Zillo were in Lübeck.

== History ==
The magazine was founded in 1989 under the name Zillostrierte, and three issues were published in A5 format.

The format was changed to the double-size A4 format, and the name was shortened to Zillo in January 1990 after a four-month break in publication, and the magazine managed to gain circulation of about 50,000 readers. Despite a positive response and an increasing number of readers, the magazine was generating a monthly loss of 10,000 Deutsche Marks. At the end of 1990 the debt was over 100,000. To avoid bankruptcy, it was decided to increase the retail price. By 1992, circulation had increased to 70,000, and the magazine had become the mouthpiece of indie and goth culture as well as the Neue Deutsche Welle ("new German wave") movement, financed by its classifieds.

In January 2014, a fire destroyed the entire editorial office, the logistics department and storage rooms of Zillo. The editorial staff announced on their website that the planned production of the February and March issues could not be realised. Later it was announced that the next issue would be released in 2015, but no new issues have been published since.

== Contents ==
=== Music ===
Zillo regularly included a sampler CD which contained both well-known acts and new, lesser-known bands. They regularly released compilation CDs since 1991. The compilation Zillo Dark Summer - Best Of Goth Open Airs 2000 was on the German Alternative Charts in 2000 for 8 weeks, peaking at number 1. The Zillo Festival 2001 compilation also charted on the DAC.

Selected editions also included a second CD, a DVD, a calendar, or gimmicks like an ice scraper. The following sections appear in Zillo Music:

- Alternative rock
- Big beat
- Crossover
- Dark rock
- Wave
- Electronic body music (EBM)
- Electro
- Glam rock
- Gothic rock
- Grunge
- Indie rock
- Industrial
- Madchester rave
- Metal
- Mittelalter rock
- Neofolk
- Post-rock
- Neue Deutsche Härte
- Synthpop
- Trip hop

=== Comics ===
An appreciable part of Zillo were the comic strips. The first comics were drawn by Nicole Scheriau and Marcus Zysk, from April 1993 and onward, often making fun of the New Wave and Goth movements. Scheriau was replaced in September 1995 with Uwe Roesch and his Dead comics, which, like Scheriau's, made fun of the Goth scene. Recently, there were 2-3 comics in every issue with death-specific icons that illustrate individual headings.

== Festival ==
From 1993 to 1997, Zillo organized the Zillo Festival. First planned in 1990, the open-air concert didn't happen until 1993. It has been held in many places, starting in Durmersheim in 1993 and 1994, then Russelsheim in 1995. Between 1996 and 1999 it took place at the airport in Hildesheim. This annual music festival turned in to the M'era Luna Festival.

== Zillo Shop ==
Over the years, the Zillo shop emerged as significant support for the magazine. At both festivals and the online store, Zillo sells such things as T-shirts, sample CDs, mugs, watches, rear window stickers, and accessories with dark, quirky motifs. The shop includes over 100 death-themed images.

== See also ==
- Sonic Seducer
