= Dead or Alive discography =

- Studio albums: 8
- Compilation albums: 6
- Singles: 28
- Video albums: 2
- Music videos: 17

The discography of Dead or Alive, an English dance-pop group, consists of eight studio albums, seven compilation albums, twenty-eight singles, and two video albums. Formed by frontman Pete Burns in 1980 in Liverpool, the band were first signed to the independent Rough Trade label in 1982, though moved to Epic Records the following year. Their debut album, Sophisticated Boom Boom, was released in 1984, producing a series of minor hits in the UK, most notably their version of "That's the Way (I Like It)" (originally recorded by KC and the Sunshine Band) which gave them their first UK Top 40 hit.

Their second album, Youthquake (1985), reached the UK Top 10 and brought the band international recognition, largely due to the success of the lead single, "You Spin Me Round (Like a Record)" which reached No. 1 on the UK Singles Chart and No. 11 on the US Billboard Hot 100 in 1985. The album also contained three other UK Top 40 hits: "Lover Come Back to Me", "In Too Deep", and "My Heart Goes Bang (Get Me to the Doctor)". The band's third album, Mad, Bad and Dangerous to Know, was released in 1986, and contained two UK Top 40 hits. In 1988, the group released their fourth studio album, Nude, which failed to sell in their native UK but brought the band success in Japan, spawning three No. 1 singles including 1988's "Turn Around & Count 2 Ten". After the album's official release, two members of the group left with only singer Burns and percussionist Steve Coy remaining. Together, they released three more studio albums: Fan the Flame (Part 1) (1990), Nukleopatra (1995) and Fragile (2000).

== Albums ==
=== Studio albums ===
Title	Details	Peak chart positions								Certifications (sales threshold)
Title	Details	UK	AUS	CAN	JPN	NZ	SWE	SWI	US	Certifications (sales threshold)
Sophisticated Boom Boom	Release date: 20 April 1984; Label: Epic; Formats: LP, cassette, CD	29	—	—	—	—	—	—	—	
Youthquake	Release date: 13 May 1985; Label: Epic; Formats: LP, cassette, CD	9	17	8	31	43	29	10	31	BPI: Gold; MC: Platinum; RIAA: Gold
Mad, Bad and Dangerous to Know	Release date: 21 November 1986; Label: Epic; Formats: LP, cassette, CD	27	37	52	19	—	21	—	52	
Nude	Release date: 31 July 1989; Label: Epic; Formats: LP, cassette, CD	82	62	87	9	—	—	—	106	
Fan the Flame (Part 1)	Release date: 13 December 1990; Label: Epic; Formats: CD, LP	—	—	—	23	—	—	—	—	
Nukleopatra	Release date: 21 October 1995; Label: Epic; Formats: CD, LP	—	43	—	—	—	—	—	—	
Fragile	Release date: 27 September 2000; Label: Avex Trax; Formats: CD, LP	—	—	—	45	—	—	—	—	
Fan the Flame (Part 2): The Resurrection	Release date: 29 October 2021; Label: Demon Music Group; Formats: CD, LP	65	—	—	—	—	—	—	—	
"—" denotes a recording that did not chart or was not released in that territory.

=== Compilation albums ===
Title	Album details	Peak chart positions			
Title	Album details	UK	AUS	JPN	US
Rip It Up	Release date: 1987; Label: Epic; Formats: LP, cassette	—	130	4	195
Star Box	Release date: 21 November 1993; Label: Epic; Formats: CD	—	—	—	—
Evolution: The Hits	Release date: 24 June 2003; Label: Epic; Formats: CD	111	—	47	—
That's the Way I Like It: The Best of Dead or Alive	Release date: 25 October 2010; Label: Sony UK; Formats: CD, LP, digital download	—	—	—	—
Let Them Drag My Soul Away: Singles, Demos, Sessions and Live Recordings 1979–1982	Release date: 21 July 2023; Label: Cherry Red; Formats: CD	25	—	—	—
Running Wild: The Inevitable Years	Release date: 31 May 2024; Label: Cherry Red; Formats: LP	—	—	—	—
"—" denotes a recording that did not chart or was not released in that territory.

=== Box sets ===
Title	Album details
Sophisticated Boom Box MMXVI	Release date: 28 October 2016; Label: Edsel; Formats: CD, LP
Invincible	Release date: 9 October 2020; Label: Edsel
Still Spinnin': The Singles Collection 1983–2021	Release date: 16 February 2024; Label: Edsel; Formats: CD

=== Remix albums ===
Title	Album details	Peak chart positions
Title	Album details	JPN
Nude – Remade Remodelled	Release date: 21 September 1989; Label: Epic; Formats: CD, cassette	17
Unbreakable – The Fragile Remixes	Release date: 2001; Label: Avex Trax; Formats: CD	—
The Pete Hammond Hi-NRG Remixes	Release date: 26 April 2024; Label: Demon/Edsel; Formats: CD, vinyl, DL	—
Youthquake Remixes	Release date: 12 April 2025; Label: Demon; Formats: vinyl	—

=== Video albums ===
Title	Album details
Rip It Up Live	Release date: 1988; Label: Sony BMG; Formats: VHS, LaserDisc
Evolution	Release date: 7 July 2003; Label: Sony BMG; Formats: DVD, digital download

== Extended plays ==
Title	EP details
Birth of a Nation	Released under the name Nightmares in Wax; Release date: 1980; Label: Inevitable; Formats: 7-inch EP

== Singles ==
Title	Year	Peak chart positions									Certifications (sales threshold)	Album
Title	Year	UK	AUS	CAN	GER	JPN	NZ	SWI	US	US Dance	Certifications (sales threshold)	Album
"I'm Falling"	1980	—	—	—	—	—	—	—	—	—		Non-album singles
"Number Eleven"	1981	—	—	—	—	—	—	—	—	—		Non-album singles
"It's Been Hours Now"	1982	—	—	—	—	—	—	—	—	—		Non-album singles
"The Stranger"	1982	—	—	—	—	—	—	—	—	—		Non-album singles
"Misty Circles"	1983	100	—	—	—	—	—	—	—	4		Sophisticated Boom Boom
"What I Want"	1983	88	—	—	—	—	—	—	—	—		Sophisticated Boom Boom
"I'd Do Anything"	1984	79	—	—	—	—	—	—	—	—		Sophisticated Boom Boom
"That's the Way (I Like It)"	1984	22	45	—	—	—	—	—	—	28		Sophisticated Boom Boom
"What I Want" (re-release)	1984	87	—	—	—	—	—	—	—	—		Sophisticated Boom Boom
"You Spin Me Round (Like a Record)"	1984	1	3	1	2	54	6	1	11	4	BPI: Platinum; MC: Gold	Youthquake
"Lover Come Back to Me"	1985	11	13	95	21	9	41	5	75	13		Youthquake
"In Too Deep"	1985	14	31	—	61	—	—	—	—	—		Youthquake
"My Heart Goes Bang (Get Me to the Doctor)"	1985	23	41	—	—	12	—	—	—	15		Youthquake
"Brand New Lover"	1986	31	21	27	—	2	15	—	15	1		Mad, Bad and Dangerous to Know
"Something in My House"	1987	12	19	—	—	—	31	—	85	3		Mad, Bad and Dangerous to Know
"Hooked on Love"	1987	69	33	—	—	—	—	—	—	—		Mad, Bad and Dangerous to Know
"I'll Save You All My Kisses"	1987	78	47	—	—	—	—	—	—	—		Mad, Bad and Dangerous to Know
"Turn Around and Count 2 Ten"	1988	70	30	—	—	1	—	—	—	2		Nude
"Come Home With Me Baby"	1989	62	45	—	—	1	—	—	69	1		Nude
"Baby Don't Say Goodbye"	1989	—	—	—	—	1	—	—	—	6		Nude
"Your Sweetness (Is Your Weakness)"	1990	—	—	—	—	3	—	—	—	—		Fan the Flame (Part 1)
"Gone 2 Long"	1991	—	—	—	—	14	—	—	—	—		Fan the Flame (Part 1)
"Unhappy Birthday"	1991	—	—	—	—	18	—	—	—	—		Fan the Flame (Part 1)
"Rebel Rebel"*	1994	76	97	—	—	—	—	—	—	—		Nukleopatra
"You Spin Me Round (Like a Record)" (1996 Remix)	1996	—	28	—	—	—	—	—	—	—		Nukleopatra (Australia release)
"Sex Drive"	1997	—	52	—	—	—	—	—	—	—		Nukleopatra
"Hit and Run Lover"	2000	—	—	—	—	2	—	—	—	—		Fragile
"You Spin Me Round 2003"	2003	23	62	—	96	—	—	—	—	21		Evolution: The Hits
"You Spin Me Round (Like a Record)" (re-release)	2006	5	—	—	—	—	—	—	—	—		Youthquake
"Tonight..."	2021	—	—	—	—	—	—	—	—	—		Fan the Flame (Part 2): The Resurrection
"Total Stranger" (Pete Hammond Hi-NRG Remix)	2024	—	—	—	—	—	—	—	—	—		The Pete Hammond Hi-NRG Remixes
"—" denotes a recording that did not chart or was not released in that territory.
* Released under the name International Chrysis.

== Music videos ==
- "I'd Do Anything" (1984)
- "That's the Way (I Like It)" (1984)
- "You Spin Me Round (Like a Record)" (1984)
- "Lover Come Back to Me" (1985)
- "In Too Deep" (1985)
- "My Heart Goes Bang" (1985)
- "Brand New Lover" (1986)
- "Something in My House" (1987)
- "Hooked on Love" (1987)
- "I'll Save You All My Kisses" (1987)
- "Turn Around and Count 2 Ten" (1988)
- "Come Home (With Me Baby)" (1988)
- "Your Sweetness (Is Your Weakness)" (1990)
- "Rebel Rebel" (1994)
- "Sex Drive" (1996)
- "You Spin Me Round (Like a Record)" (1996 Remix) (1996)
- "You Spin Me Round (Like a Record)" (1997 Jailhouse Mix) (1997)
- "Hit & Run Lover" (2000)
- "You Spin Me Round (Like a Record)" (2003 Remix) (2003)
