= Sophisticated Boom Box MMXVI =

- The artwork for the CD/DVD edition.

Box set by Dead or Alive
- Released: 28 October 2016
- Recorded: 1983–2010
- Genre: Dance-pop; Hi-NRG
- Label: Edsel Records

Dead or Alive chronology
That's the Way I Like It: The Best of Dead or Alive (2010)	Sophisticated Boom Box MMXVI (2016)	Fan the Flame (Part 2): The Resurrection (2021)

Sophisticated Boom Box MMXVI is a comprehensive box set by English band Dead or Alive, released on both 17CD/2DVD and 10LP versions, on October 28, 2016. The set compiles the band's seven studio albums, from Sophisticated Boom Boom (1984) to Fragile (2000), and includes the remix albums Rip It Up (1987), Nude: Remade Remodelled (1989) and Unbreakable: The Fragile Remixes (2001). Variants of both the CD/DVD and LP sets were sold on Amazon with limited edition exclusivities. The CD/DVD edition came with a signed print by band frontman Pete Burns, limited to 750 units, and the LP version came with a bonus 10" vinyl EP including tracks previously unreleased on the format.

Along with the previously released material compiled, the CD/DVD set is noteworthy for the inclusion of 12 previously unreleased tracks in the Dead or Alive discography, including, but not limited to, "Fan The Flame" featuring German singer Gina X, "The Art", a Pete Burns solo track produced by The Dirty Disco, and a full concert recording from the Youthquake Tour, recorded live at the Hammersmith Odeon in July 1985. With the release of the Sophisticated Boom Box, Nude: Remade Remodelled (1989), Fan The Flame (Part 1) (1990), Nukleopatra (1995), Fragile (2000) and Unbreakable: The Fragile Remixes (2001) were given their debut UK releases, with all but Nukleopatra previously only being available in Japan. The vinyl set marked the first time that the post-Nude (1988) albums were released on the format, in any territory. The collection was the last Dead or Alive release Burns contributed to before his death in October 2016, five days before the set's release. This would also be the final release drummer/producer Steve Coy would contribute to before his death in May 2018.

== Background ==
Prior to the Sophisticated Boom Box, Dead or Alive had released three greatest hits collections, Rip It Up (1987), Evolution: The Hits (2003) and That's The Way I Like It: The Best of Dead or Alive (2010), all on Epic/Sony Records. All three were composed of the band's UK singles, with only Evolution including the band's 1990s and 2000s output. Unlike the aforementioned compilations, Sophisticated Boom Box MMXVI was the first collection to comprehensively compile the Dead or Alive discography, including Pete Burns' solo material, however, excluding all material from earlier than Sophisticated Boom Boom (1984), the pre-Epic period. The set includes the UK number one "You Spin Me Round (Like A Record)", US dance number ones "Brand New Lover" and "Come Home (With Me Baby)" and Japanese number one "Turn Around And Count 2 Ten", where the latter remained atop the chart for 17 weeks.

== Promotion ==
The release of Sophisticated Boom Box MMXVI was announced on September 8, 2016, via Demon Music Group as a "personally curated [by Burns and Coy] 19 disc set, featuring the original album tracklistings plus a plethora of rarities, live recordings, alternate mixes, instrumental versions and more than 12 previously unreleased remixes and tracks from their vaults, bringing a unique collection together from the band’s internationally successful career for the very first time." A promo video for the set was released shortly after on the band's Facebook group on Amazon and YouTube, featuring the music videos for the singles, "You Spin Me Round", "Lover Come Back To Me", "Brand New Lover", "In Too Deep", "Something In My House", "That's The Way (I Like It)" and the 2003 version of "You Spin Me Round" from Evolution: The Hits. Burns was due to appear on the British talk show Loose Women to promote the set on October 24, 2016, the day after he died, but pulled out the week prior due to "ill health".

== Errors ==
On the day of release, Demon Music Group released a statement on their website detailing multiple errors with the CD/DVD variant of the box set, and offering replacements for nine of the 17 CDs and both DVDs. Another statement on November 28, 2016, detailed further issues regarding the mispressing of most of the set's discs.

- On CD1, ""I'd Do Anything" finishes with an extra “do do do” which sounds odd on play back." Tracks 8 and 9 are "cut short in the blending of these two tracks." ""That's The Way (I Like It) (7" Version)" plays at a slower speed."
- On CD2, ""What I Want (1984 Dance Mix)" plays the same as track 2, the "Original Dance Mix"." Tracks 1–4 were "ripped directly from the Cherry Pop release, sourced from vinyl." Track 9 is "identical to" track 12.
- CD3 "plays in mono." ""My Heart Goes Bang (7" Version)" plays the same as the album version." ""Lover Come Back To Me" plays at a "slower speed."
- CD4 "plays in mono." ""My Heart Goes Bang (American WIPE-OUT Mix)" should be listed as an edit." ""You Spin Me Round (Big Ben Mix)" sounds like a reconstruction."
- On CD6, "there is an awkward gap between "Then There Was You" and "Come Inside"." ""Brand New Lover (Edit)" appears to be slower than any other version. ""I Want You (7" Mix)" is sourced from vinyl."
- On CD8, ""Something In My House (Short Version)" plays the 7" remix." ""Baby Don't Say Goodbye (The Powerful Club Twelve)" is sourced from vinyl."
- On CD9, tracks 1 and 2 are "easily identified as coming from a vinyl source, and sourced from low bitrate MP3s". ""You Spin Me Round (Like A Record) (Blue Sky Mix)" is ripped from vinyl, skips three seconds into the track and is sourced from a low bitrate MP3." (The exact source for this track was ripped from YouTube).
- On CD11, ""Baby Don't Say Goodbye (Extended Mix)" has bad sound quality."
- On CD14, "tracks 1 and 6 are identical up until 6:10-ish..." ""International Thing (Nu-NRG 12" Remix)" plays the album version."
- Both DVDs had "freezing and cropping issues".

On December 8, 2016, Demon released a third statement regarding mispressed vinyl Sophisticated Boom Box sets, with the Nude LP pressed to play Elvis Presley & The Royal Philharmonic Orchestra's The Wonder of You. Re-pressed correct copies were sent to customers shortly after.

== Track listing ==
The CD/DVD package contains the full, 272-track compilation, including remixes, alternate versions, live performances and previously unreleased tracks. The abridged LP package only contains the band's seven studio albums, and excludes all bonus material. The track list below represent the corrected, non-mispressed versions of the CD/DVD version of the set.

CD1-2: Sophisticated Boom Boom
No.	Title	Length
1.	"I'd Do Anything"	4:16
2.	"That's the Way (I Like It)"	3:39
3.	"Absolutely Nothing"	4:21
4.	"What I Want"	5:23
5.	"Far Too Hard"	4:31
6.	"You Make Me Wanna"	2:54
7.	"Sit on It"	3:07
8.	"Wish You Were Here"	5:21
9.	"Misty Circles"	3:39
10.	"Do It"	3:53
11.	"Selfish Side"	2:35
12.	"Misty Circles (7" Version)"	3:51
13.	"What I Want (7" Version)"	3:45
14.	"I'd Do Anything (7" Version)"	4:05
15.	"That's The Way (I Like It) (7" Version)"	3:09

Tracks 11–15 are denoted as bonus tracks.

No.	Title	Length
1.	"Misty Circles (Dance Mix)"	9:10
2.	"What I Want (Original Dance Mix)"	6:12
3.	"I'd Do Anything (Megamix)"	5:22
4.	"That's The Way (I Like It) (Extended Version)"	5:52
5.	"What I Want (1984 Dance Mix)"	5:50
6.	"What I Want (1984 7" Remix)"	3:49
7.	"Give It To Me (BBC Session)"	3:23
8.	"Misty Circles (Dub Mix)"	6:13
9.	"That's The Way (I Like It) (Dub)"	3:41
10.	"Absolutely Nothing (Dub)"	4:35
11.	"Misty Circles (Instrumental)"	3:43
12.	"Keep That Body Strong (That's The Way)"	3:38

All tracks are denoted as bonus tracks. Tracks 9 and 10 are denoted as being previously unreleased.

CD3-5: Youthquake
No.	Title	Length
1.	"You Spin Me Round (Like A Record)"	3:17
2.	"I Wanna Be A Toy"	3:57
3.	"DJ Hit That Button"	3:27
4.	"In Too Deep"	4:09
5.	"Big Daddy Of The Rhythm"	3:21
6.	"Cake And Eat It"	4:37
7.	"Lover Come Back To Me"	3:07
8.	"My Heart Goes Bang"	3:11
9.	"It's Been A Long Time"	7:58
10.	"You Spin Me Round (Like A Record) (Murder Mix)"	8:03
11.	"In Too Deep (7" Remix)"	3:51
12.	"My Heart Goes Bang (7" Version)"	3:12
13.	"Lover Come Back To Me (Extended Version)"	5:26
14.	"My Heart Goes Bang (Extended Version)"	7:17

Tracks 10–14 are denoted as bonus tracks.

No.	Title	Length
1.	"In Too Deep (Off Yer Mong Mix)"	6:19
2.	"You Spin Me Round (Like A Record) (Performance Mix)"	7:27
3.	"Lover Come Back To Me (Extended Remix)"	5:55
4.	"My Heart Goes Bang (American WIPE-OUT Mix)"	6:21
5.	"You Spin Me Round (Like A Record) (Alt. Album CD Version With 'Rock It' Intro)"	3:21
6.	"Cake And Eat It (Alt. Album CD Version With Unfaded Intro)"	4:43
7.	"It’s Been A Long Time (Alt. Album CD Version With ‘You Can Be The First…’ Intro)"	8:01
8.	"You Spin Me Round (Like A Record) (Big Ben Mix)"	3:41
9.	"Lover Come Back To Me (7" Bonus Mix)"	3:22
10.	"I Wanna Be A Toy (Instrumental)"	3:58
11.	"Lover Come Back To Me (Instrumental)"	4:46
12.	"In Too Deep (Instrumental)"	4:12
13.	"My Heart Goes Bang (Instrumental)"	4:34

All tracks are denoted as bonus tracks. Tracks 10 and 11 are denoted as being previously unreleased.

No.	Title	Length
1.	"Cake And Eat It (Live)"	5:21
2.	"My Heart Goes Bang (Live)"	3:14
3.	"In Too Deep (Live)"	4:36
4.	"Big Daddy Of The Rhythm (Live)"	3:14
5.	"Far Too Hard (Live)"	4:13
6.	"Misty Circles (Live)"	5:57
7.	"It’s Been A Long Time (Live)"	5:58
8.	"Lover Come Back To Me (Live)"	3:35
9.	"DJ Hit That Button (Live)"	3:10
10.	"What I Want (Live)"	5:04
11.	"You Spin Me Round (Like A Record) (Live)"	6:23
12.	"In Too Deep (Encore) (Live)"	4:36
13.	"My Heart Goes Bang (Encore) (Live)"	3:16
14.	"You Spin Me Round (Encore) (Live)"	6:12

All tracks are denoted as bonus tracks. All tracks, except 1, 3 and 4, are denoted as being previously unreleased.

CD6-7: Mad Bad and Dangerous To Know
No.	Title	Length
1.	"Brand New Lover"	5:19
2.	"I'll Save You All My Kisses"	3:33
3.	"Son Of A Gun"	4:17
4.	"Then There Was You"	3:42
5.	"Come Inside"	4:30
6.	"Something In My House"	7:19
7.	"Hooked On Love"	3:54
8.	"I Want You"	4:13
9.	"Special Star"	4:11
10.	"Come Inside (7" Mix)"	4:20
11.	"I Want You (7" Mix)"	4:03
12.	"Brand New Lover (Edit)"	3:42
13.	"Something In My House (7" Remix)"	3:50
14.	"Hooked On Love (Edit)"	3:37
15.	"I'll Save You All My Kisses (Remix)"	3:27
16.	"Something In My House (Flamenco Version)"	4:23
17.	"Hooked On Love (7" Remix)"	4:23

Tracks 10–17 are denoted as bonus tracks.

No.	Title	Length
1.	"Brand New Lover (The Dust Monkey's Love Bubble Club Mix)"	9:05
2.	"Something In My House (Mortevicar Mix)"	7:00
3.	"Hooked On Love (The Big Revolver Mix)"	8:26
4.	"I'll Save You All My Kisses (The Sonia Mezumbda Memorial Mix)"	5:19
5.	"Brand New Lover (Up Ducky Mix)"	6:30
6.	"Something In My House (7" US Wipe-Out Mix)"	4:33
7.	"Something In My House (12" US Wipe-Out Mix Part 2)"	7:21
8.	"I'll Save You All My Kisses (The Long Wet Sloppy Kiss Mix)"	7:10
9.	"Hooked On Love (La Vie En Rose Mix)"	3:54
10.	"Brand New Lover (Instrumental)"	4:18
11.	"Something In My House (House Instrumental)"	5:25
12.	"Hooked On Love (Instrumental)"	5:04
13.	"Something In My House (7" Instru-MENTAL Mix)"	3:28

All tracks are denoted as bonus tracks. Tracks 6 and 12 are denoted as being previously unreleased.

CD8-9: Rip It Up
No.	Title	Length
1.	"Brand New Lover"	4:33
2.	"My Heart Goes Bang"	5:23
3.	"Something In My House"	4:25
4.	"Lover Come Back To Me"	3:52
5.	"You Spin Me Round (Like A Record)"	4:27
6.	"I'll Save You All My Kisses"	4:45
7.	"In Too Deep"	3:55
8.	"Hooked On Love"	4:10
9.	"Mighty Mix (Part 1) (Wish You Were Here / What I Want / Do It / Misty Circles)"	7:47
10.	"Mighty Mix (Part 2) (Absolutely Nothing / Sit On It / You Make Me Wanna / That's The Way (I Like It))"	8:18
11.	"Something In My House (Naughty XXX Mix)"	6:57
12.	"Baby Don't Say Goodbye (The Powerful Club Twelve)"	5:46
13.	"Something In My House (Short Version)"	3:27

Tracks 9–13 are denoted as bonus tracks. Track 13 is denoted as being previously unreleased.

No.	Title	Length
1.	"Baby Don't Say Goodbye (Club Mix)"	8:33
2.	"Baby Don't Say Goodbye (Instrumental)"	4:52
3.	"You Spin Me Round (Like A Record) (Jail House Club Edit Remix)"	4:18
4.	"You Spin Me Round (Like A Record) (Jail House Club Remix)"	4:35
5.	"You Spin Me Round (Like A Record) (400 Hz - Kleopatra Remix)"	6:45
6.	"You Spin Me Round (Like A Record) (400 Hz - Marc Antoine Remix)"	7:03
7.	"You Spin Me Round (Like A Record) (Edouard's Mix)"	4:07
8.	"You Spin Me Round (Like A Record) (Kalk's Underground Mix)"	5:18
9.	"You Spin Me Round (Like A Record) (Blue Sky Mix)"	4:01
10.	"You Spin Me Round (Like A Record) (The Yummi Mix)"	3:27
11.	"You Spin Me Round (Like A Record) (The Yummi 4am Mix)"	5:59
12.	"You Spin Me Round (Like A Record) (The Vicious Mix)"	8:14
13.	"Medley: Live In Nagoya, Japan 29 November 1990 (Turn Around And Count 2 Ten / Blue Christmas / Your Sweetness)"	11:04

All tracks are denoted as bonus tracks.

CD10-11: Nude (including Nude: Remade Remodelled)
No.	Title	Length
1.	"Turn Around And Count 2 Ten"	6:53
2.	"Give It Back (That Love Is Mine)"	3:28
3.	"Baby Don't Say Goodbye"	5:56
4.	"Stop Kicking My Heart Around"	6:09
5.	"Come Home (With Me Baby)"	4:06
6.	"I Don't Wanna Be Your Boyfriend"	4:40
7.	"Get Out Of My House"	4:20
8.	"I Cannot Carry On"	4:59
9.	"My Forbidden Lover"	3:36
10.	"Give It Back (That Love Is Mine) (Instrumental)"	3:27
11.	"Baby Don't Say Goodbye (Alternative Mix)"	4:19
12.	"Love Toy (Instrumental)"	1:55
13.	"Turn Around And Count 2 Ten (7" Version)"	4:49
14.	"Come Home (With Me Baby) (7" Version)"	3:51
15.	"Baby Don't Say Goodbye (Edited House Version)"	4:02
16.	"Love Toy (Full Vocal Version)"	4:12
17.	"Come Home (With Me Baby) (The Deadhouse Dub 7″ Edit)"	3:30
18.	"Baby Don't Say Goodbye (Radio Edit)"	4:27

Tracks 10–18 are denoted as bonus tracks. Track 16 is denoted as being previously unreleased.

No.	Title	Length
1.	"Come Home (With Me Baby) (Remade Remodelled)"	6:47
2.	"Baby Don’t Say Goodbye (Remade Remodelled)"	6:30
3.	"Stop Kicking My Heart Around (Remade Remodelled)"	5:49
4.	"I Don’t Wanna Be Your Boyfriend (Remade Remodelled)"	5:32
5.	"Give It Back (That Love Is Mine) (Remade Remodelled)"	5:46
6.	"Turn Around And Count 2 Ten (Remade Remodelled)"	6:33
7.	"Come Home (With Me Baby) (12" Version)"	6:20
8.	"Baby Don't Say Goodbye (Extended Mix)"	6:43
9.	"Turn Around And Count 2 Ten (The Pearl And Dean "I Love" BPM Mix)"	8:35
10.	"Come Home (With Me Baby) (The Deadhouse Dub)"	6:24
11.	"Turn Around And Count 2 Ten (The Pearl And Dean "I Had A Disco Dream" Mix)"	7:13
12.	"Turn Around And Count 2 Ten (Instru-MENTAL)"	3:00
13.	"Come Home (With Me Baby) (Instru-MENTAL)"	3:33

Tracks 8–13 are denoted as bonus tracks. Track 13 is denoted as being previously unreleased.

CD12: Fan The Flame (Part 1)
No.	Title	Length
1.	"Fan The Flame (feat. Gina X)"	3:52
2.	"Unhappy Birthday"	6:47
3.	"Your Sweetness (Is Your Weakness)"	5:51
4.	"Total Stranger"	7:04
5.	"Gone 2 Long"	5:47
6.	"Lucky Day"	7:59
7.	"What Have U Done (2 Make Me Change)"	6:15
8.	"And Then I Met U"	8:04
9.	"Blue Christmas"	3:56
10.	"Total Stranger (Remix)"	7:07
11.	"Unhappy Birthday (Heavy Metal Version)"	7:33
12.	"Your Sweetness (Is Your Weakness) (Instrumental)"	5:52

Tracks 10–12 are denoted as bonus tracks. Track 1 is denoted as being previously unreleased.

CD13-14: Nukleopatra
No.	Title	Length
1.	"Nukleopatra"	4:20
2.	"Rebel Rebel"	4:17
3.	"Sleep With You"	5:32
4.	"The Right Stuff"	4:07
5.	"I'm A Star"	4:56
6.	"International Thing"	6:58
7.	"Picture This"	4:54
8.	"Spend The Night Together"	9:07
9.	"Gone Too Long"	5:01
10.	"Getting It On"	7:19
11.	"Sex Drive"	6:38
12.	"You Spin Me Round (Like A Record) (Sugar Pumpers Radio Mix)"	3:39

Track 12 is denoted as a bonus track.

No.	Title	Length
1.	"Rebel Rebel (12" Extended Mix)"	6:16
2.	"The Right Stuff (1994 Mix)"	4:07
3.	"You Spin Me Round (Like A Record) (Sugar Pumpers Extended Mix)"	5:13
4.	"Sex Drive (Sugar Pumpers Extended Mix)"	5:55
5.	"International Thing (International 7" Edit)"	3:46
6.	"Rebel Rebel (The Hole Mix)"	6:37
7.	"Sex Drive (Scream Driven Remix)"	7:01
8.	"International Thing (Nu-NRG 7" Remix)"	4:23
9.	"Rebel Rebel (Safe Hands Remix)"	5:17
10.	"You Spin Me Round (Like A Record) (Sugar Pumpers Pumpin' Mix)"	7:08
11.	"Sex Drive (Peewee's Extended Mix)"	9:34
12.	"International Thing (Nu-NRG 12" Remix)"	6:57

All tracks are denoted as bonus tracks.

CD15-17: Fragile (including Unbreakable: The Fragile Remixes)
No.	Title	Length
1.	"Hit And Run Lover"	4:41
2.	"Something In My House (2000)"	5:09
3.	"Even Better Than The Real Thing (2000)"	4:26
4.	"Turn Around And Count 2 Ten (2000)"	6:43
5.	"I Paralyze"	6:00
6.	"Isn’t It A Pity?"	4:47
7.	"You Spin Me Round (Like A Record) (2000)"	6:07
8.	"Just What I Always Wanted"	5:20
9.	"My Heart Goes Bang (2000)"	5:06
10.	"Lover Come Back To Me (2000)"	5:39
11.	"I Promised Myself"	4:34
12.	"Blue Christmas (2000)"	3:38

No.	Title	Length
1.	"Turn Around And Count 2 Ten (Y&Co. "B" Mix)"	7:53
2.	"You Spin Me Round (Like A Record) (Zi Zone Mix)"	4:34
3.	"My Heart Goes Bang (Love Machine Remix)"	5:05
4.	"Something In My House (Deadend Of Eurasia Mix)"	5:41
5.	"Hit And Run Lover (Ventura Mix)"	5:01
6.	"Isn’t It A Pity (Bustard Remix)"	5:16
7.	"I Paralyze (B4 Za Beat Remix)"	6:35
8.	"Blue Christmas (P.K.G. Remix)"	4:32
9.	"Lover Come Back To Me (Earthquake Mix)"	9:31
10.	"Just What I Always Wanted (R.M. Hyper Techno Mix)"	4:47

No.	Title	Length
1.	"You Spin Me Round (Like A Record) (Punx Soundcheck Vs Princess Julia)"	6:43
2.	"You Spin Me Round (Like A Record) (Mark Moore & Mr Motion Remix)"	6:20
3.	"You Spin Me Round (Like A Record) (D-Bop Club Mix)"	7:15
4.	"You Spin Me Round (Like A Record) (Metro 7" Edit)"	3:46
5.	"Hit And Run Lover (Bonus Hit Remix)"	4:42
6.	"You Spin Me Round (Like A Record) (Metro 12" Extended Mix)"	6:57
7.	"Pop Life"	4:48
8.	"Why’s It So Hard"	5:09
9.	"Jack & Jill Party (Pet Shop Boys feat. Pete Burns)"	4:06
10.	"Never Marry An Icon (Pete Burns vs. The Dirty Disco)"	3:12
11.	"The Art (Pete Burns vs. The Dirty Disco)"	3:28

All tracks denoted as bonus tracks. Track 11 denoted as being previously unreleased.

DVD1: Promo Videos
No.	Title	Length
1.	"I’d Do Anything"
2.	"That’s The Way (I Like It)"
3.	"You Spin Me Round (Like A Record)"
4.	"Lover Come Back To Me"
5.	"In Too Deep"
6.	"My Heart Goes Bang"
7.	"Something In My House"
8.	"Hooked On Love"
9.	"I’ll Save You All My Kisses"
10.	"Brand New Lover (12")"
11.	"Something In My House (12")"
12.	"Come Home (With Me Baby)"
13.	"Turn Around And Count 2 Ten (12")"
14.	"Come Home (With Me Baby) (12")"
15.	"Your Sweetness (Is Your Weakness)"
16.	"Total Stranger (Rough)"
17.	"Rebel Rebel"
18.	"Sex Drive"
19.	"Hit And Run Lover"
20.	"You Spin Me Round (Like A Record) (2003)"

DVD2: 'Rip It Up Live' – Japan, 1987 & TV Performances
No.	Title	Length
1.	"Hooked On Love"
2.	"My Heart Goes Bang"
3.	"You Spin Me Round (Like A Record)"
4.	"Lover Come Back To Me"
5.	"Brand New Lover"
6.	"I’ll Save You All My Kisses"
7.	"In Too Deep"
8.	"Something In My House"
9.	"Come Inside"
10.	"Son Of A Gun"
11.	"I’ll Save You All My Kisses (Encore)"
12.	"That’s The Way (I Like It) (On 'Top Of The Pops') (TX 12/04/1984)"
13.	"You Spin Me Round (Like A Record) (On 'Top Of The Pops') (TX 14/02/1985)"
14.	"Lover Come Back To Me (On 'Top Of The Pops') (TX 1985)"
15.	"In Too Deep (On 'Top Of The Pops') (TX 1985)"
16.	"Lover Come Back To Me (On 'The Kenny Everett Television Show') (TX 11/05/1985)"
17.	"In Too Deep (On 'Wogan') (TX 17/06/1985)"
18.	"You Spin Me Round (Like A Record) (On 'Christmas Top Of The Pops') (TX 25/12/1985)"
19.	"Brand New Lover (On 'Wogan') (TX 1986)"
20.	"Brand New Lover (On 'Roland Rat: The Series') (TX 1986)"
21.	"Something In My House (On 'Top Of The Pops') (TX 22/01/1987)"
22.	"You Spin Me Round (Like A Record) (On 'Blue Peter') (TX 10/01/2003)"
