= Evolution: The Hits =

Greatest hits album by Dead or Alive
- Released: 24 June 2003
- Recorded: 1984–2001
- Genre: Pop, dance-pop, new wave, acid house, Hi-NRG, Europop
- Length: Various
- Label: Epic / Sony Music
- Producer: Stock Aitken Waterman; Dead or Alive; Zeus B. Held

Dead or Alive chronology
Unbreakable (2001)	Evolution: The Hits (2003)	That's the Way I Like It: The Best of Dead or Alive (2010)

Professional ratings
Review scores
Source	Rating
Allmusic	4.5/5 stars

Evolution: The Hits is a compilation album from the English dance/pop band Dead or Alive, in 2003. This is the band's second hits collection, after 1987's Rip It Up. This collection spans their musical history from their 1984 debut album, Sophisticated Boom Boom, to 2000's Fragile, and contains all their single releases and several remixes. The album was released in two editions: a single disc containing 18 tracks, and a double disc containing 28 tracks. A DVD video compilation was also released.

== Track listing ==
=== Collector's Edition ===
==== CD 1 ====
1. "You Spin Me Round (Like a Record)" (Performance Mix)† – 7:27
2. "My Heart Goes Bang (Get Me to the Doctor)" (12" US Wipe Out Mix)†† – 6:01
3. "Sex Drive" – 6:37 From Nukleopatra
4. "What I Want" – 5:49 From Sophisticated Boom Boom
5. "Brand New Lover" – 4:48 From Mad, Bad and Dangerous to Know
6. "Misty Circles" – 4:39 From Sophisticated Boom Boom
7. "Lover Come Back to Me" – 4:57 From Youthquake
8. "I'll Save All My Kisses" – 3:36 From Mad, Bad and Dangerous to Know
9. "I Don't Wanna Be Your Boyfriend" – 4:43 From Nude
10. "Hooked on Love" – 5:15 From Mad, Bad and Dangerous to Know
11. "I'm a Star" – 4:35 From Nukleopatra
12. "Something in My House" (2000 Remix) – 5:06 From Fragile
13. "Isn't It a Pity" – 4:44 From Fragile
14. "You Spin Me Round (Like a Record)" (Alternative Metro 7" Edit) – 4:25 Previously unreleased

==== CD 2 ====
1. "I'd Do Anything" – 5:24 From Sophisticated Boom Boom
2. "Come Home (With Me Baby)" – 3:58 From Nude
3. "That's the Way (I Like It)" – 3:05 From Sophisticated Boom Boom
4. "International Thing" – 3:44 From Nukleopatra
5. "In Too Deep" – 3:48 From Youthquake
6. "Unhappy Birthday (Ninja Billy Mix)" – 7:32 From Fan the Flame (Part 1)
7. "I Paralyze" – 5:57 From Fragile
8. "Baby Don't Say Goodbye" – 6:15 From Nude
9. "Turn Around and Count 2 Ten" – 6:55 From Nude
10. "Your Sweetness Is Your Weakness" – 5:49 From Fan the Flame (Part 1)
11. "Nukleopatra" – 4:19 From Nukleopatra
12. "Rebel Rebel" – 4:04 From Nukleopatra
13. "Hit and Run Lover" – 4:40 From Fragile
14. "You Spin Me Round (Like a Record)" (Mark Moore & Mr. Motion Remix) – 6:20 Previously unreleased

=== Standard version ===
1. "You Spin Me Round (Like a Record)" – 3:16 From Youthquake
2. "That's the Way (I Like It)" – 3:05 From Sophisticated Boom Boom
3. "In Too Deep" – 3:48 From Youthquake
4. "What I Want" – 5:49 From Sophisticated Boom Boom
5. "Misty Circles" – 4:39 From Sophisticated Boom Boom
6. "I'd Do Anything" – 4:00 From Sophisticated Boom Boom
7. "Lover Come Back to Me" (2000 Remix)††† – 5:37 From Fragile
8. "I'll Save You All My Kisses" – 3:36 From Mad, Bad and Dangerous to Know
9. "Hooked on Love" – 5:15 From Mad, Bad and Dangerous to Know
10. "Come Home with Me Baby" – 3:58 From Nude
11. "My Heart Goes Bang (Get Me to the Doctor)" (7" Wipe-out Mix) – 3:56
12. "Sex Drive" – 5:42 From Nukleopatra
13. "Turn Around and Count 2 Ten" (2000 Remix)††† – 5:16 From Fragile
14. "Hit and Run Lover" – 4:40 From Fragile
15. "Isn't It a Pity" – 4:44 From Fragile
16. "Brand New Lover" – 4:07 From Mad, Bad and Dangerous to Know
17. "Something in My House" – 3:49 From Mad, Bad and Dangerous to Know
18. "You Spin Me Round (Like a Record)" (Metro 7" Edit) – 3:47 Previously unreleased

^{†} Erroneously titled the Murder Mix.

^{††} Edited from the original 6:19 12" version.

^{†††} 2000 Fragile versions erroneously titled as from 2003.

== Personnel ==
- Dead or Alive, Zeus B. Held, Stock, Aitken & Waterman, Phil Harding (The Mixmaster), Mark McGuire, Jay Burnett, Tim Weidner, Barry Stone, Les Sharma, Simon Barnecott, Graham Stack, Princess Julia, John Taylor, Punx Soundcheck, Mark Moore & David Motion: production
- Tim Pope, Vaughan Arnell, Anthea Benton, Tony Vanden Ende, Zanna: video editors
- Linda Fletcher: management
- James & James: photography
- Julian Gozra Lozano: art direction, digital manipulation, artwork
- Simon Catwell: design
- Andie Airfix & Satori, Lynne Burns: artwork

== Chart positions ==
=== Album ===
Chart (2003)	Peak position
UK Albums Chart	111
Japanese Oricon International Albums	47
Germany (Media Control Charts)	42

=== Singles ===
Year	Single	Peak chart positions			
Year	Single	UK	US Dance	GER	AUS
2003	"You Spin Me Round 2003"	23	21	96	62

== See also ==
- Mad, Bad, and Dangerous to Know (Dead or Alive album)
