= Let Them Drag My Soul Away =

2023 compilation album by Dead or Alive

Let Them Drag My Soul Away: Singles, Demos, Sessions and Live Recordings 1979-1982

Compilation album by Dead or Alive
- Released: 21 July 2023
- Recorded: 1979–1982
- Studio: Pink Studio; Cargo Studios; Mike Percy's home studio
- Genre: Post-punk; Hi-NRG
- Label: Cherry Red Records
- Producer: Noddy Knowler, Dead or Alive, Ian Broudie

Dead or Alive chronology
Sophisticated Boom Box MMXVI (2016)	Let Them Drag My Soul Away: Singles, Demos, Sessions and Live Recordings 1979-1982 (2023)	Still Spinnin': The Singles Collection 1983-2021 (2024)

Let Them Drag My Soul Away: Singles, Demos, Sessions and Live Recordings 1979-1982 is a compilation album by British pop group Dead or Alive, released on July 21, 2023, by Cherry Red Records. Comprising material which pre-dates the release of their first studio album, Sophisticated Boom Boom (1984), the compilation features the band's singles I'm Falling, Number Eleven, The Stranger and the It's Been Hours Now EP, all of which charted on the UK Independent Singles Chart upon their initial releases. It also features the band's first commercial release, Birth of a Nation, released under the moniker Nightmares in Wax. In addition to previously released material, Let Them Drag My Soul Away features various early versions of tracks that were released on Sophisticated Boom Boom, and live material, including two Peel sessions; totalling 16 previously unreleased tracks.

The release found success in the band's native United Kingdom, where it peaked within the top 10 on the Independent Albums Chart, and within the top 40 on various other charts in the region.

== Development ==
Having acquired the rights to the material released on Inevitable Records, including Dead or Alive's first two singles, Cherry Red released the Birth of a Nation: Inevitable Records - An Independent Liverpool 1979-1986: Singles, B-Sides and Peel Sessions compilation on April 26, 2019. Named after the Nightmares In Wax release, the set included the previously unreleased Peel sessions Dead or Alive recorded in 1981 and 1982, recorded at Langham and Maida Vale, respectively, for the BBC.

In 2022, Cherry Red Records revealed via their Business Unusual newsletter that they had "just purchased the rights to some early recordings by Pete Burns’ Dead or Alive," and that they would be "releasing everything physically, in due course." This acquisition included mostly previously unreleased material and "a small amount originally released on the Black Eyes label." RetroPop Magazine stated that these recordings would receive an official release later that year. The first track released by Cherry Red from these recordings was a 1982 demo of What I Want, which the band later released as a single in 1983, as a part of their Music Musik Musique 3.0: 1982 | Synth Pop on the Air compilation, released on February 17, 2024.

== Promotion ==
Cherry Red formally announced the release of Let Them Drag My Soul Away with 3CD and abridged single LP formats later in 2024, announcing that former band members Joe Musker and Wayne Hussey, and former manager Francesco Mellina, had contributed to the release's liner notes with magazine Electronic Sound.

The 'alternative early mix' of Selfish Side was released as the compilation's first single and was serviced to digital retailers on June 30, 2024. The track was originally released as the b-side on the twelve-inch of the band's first single under Epic Records, Misty Circles in 1983. The demo of Give It To Me was released as the compilation's second digital single on July 14, 2024, a week prior to the release of Let Them Drag My Soul Away. The track was initially recorded during a Kid Jensen session for the BBC on May 26, 1983, and was released as the b-side to the twelve-inch of I'd Do Anything in 1984.

== Critical reception ==
Professional ratings
Review scores
Source	Rating
Classic Pop	4/5 stars
RetroPop	5/5 stars

Let Them Drag My Soul Away: Singles, Demos, Sessions and Live Recordings 1979-1982 received largely positive reviews from critics. In a four-star review, Classic Pop magazine writer Jon O'Brien wrote that the release was "proof, if needed, that Dead or Alive were thriving long before being spun right round." Writing for Louder Than War, Phil Newall said the compilation "hopefully bring some respect to this period of Dead or Alive, a name who, sadly, to the majority is simply linked with gorilla fur coats, botched plastic surgery, and that one song – it’s a great song, but this collection shows that prior to the tabloid headlines there was a powerful and [...] influential band, a band who maybe now will gain the plaudits they genuinely deserve." In a perfect five-star review, RetroPop magazine stated that "fans of those classic Stock Aitken Waterman records beware - you'll find none of that glossy pop here - but in each of the tracks the group's larger than life frontman's charisma shines through, proving he was always destined for stardom." For God Is In The TV, Nick James wrote that "[the] set is a fine tribute to the artist who should be remembered fondly, as an innovator who sang his way to stardom," further noting that "the general feel to [the Nightmares In Wax] songs, perhaps rather than out-and-out dance music, are in fact early signs of where goth or indie music was heading." Goldmine magazine named the release "an unmissable box full of Pete Burns' earlier classics," wherein writer Dave Thompson called the release "sensational" and "essential".

== Track listing ==
Let Them Drag My Soul Away: Singles, Demos, Sessions and Live Recordings 1979-1982 - 3CD release.

Disc 1: The Singles

No.	Title	Length
1.	"Black Leather"	5:07
2.	"Girl Song"	3:22
3.	"Shangri-La"	3:33
4.	"Girl Song (1985 Mix)"	5:23
5.	"Shangri-La (1985 Mix)"	3:49
6.	"I'm Falling"	4:34
7.	"Flowers"	5:58
8.	"Number Eleven"	4:53
9.	"Namegame (Live Version)"	3:59
10.	"It's Been Hours Now"	4:14
11.	"Whirlpool"	4:16
12.	"Nowhere to Nowhere"	2:35
13.	"It's Been Hours Now 2"	4:18
14.	"The Stranger"	4:23
15.	"Some of That"	5:57

Disc 2: The Demos

No.	Title	Length
1.	"Black Leather (4-Track Demo)"	4:13
2.	"Girl Song (4-Track Demo)"	3:17
3.	"I'll Turn Away (4-Track Demo)"	4:44
4.	"Shangri-La (4-Track Demo)"	3:10
5.	"Selfish Side (Demo)"	2:28
6.	"Far Too Hard (Demo 2nd Mix)"	4:10
7.	"Misty Circles (Demo)"	9:14
8.	"What I Want (Demo)"	4:49
9.	"Give It To Me (Demo)"	3:23
10.	"Untitled Instrumental #1"	4:29
11.	"Untitled Instrumental #2"	5:58
12.	"Untitled Instrumental #3"	2:32

Disc 3: Peel Sessions & Live Recordings

No.	Title	Length
1.	"Nowhere to Nowhere (Peel Session)"	2:49
2.	"Running Wild (Peel Session)"	3:55
3.	"Number Eleven (Peel Session)"	4:47
4.	"Flowers (Peel Session)"	6:59
5.	"Number Twelve (Peel Session)"	3:56
6.	"The Stranger (Peel Session)"	3:21
7.	"Misty Circles (Peel Session)"	3:54
8.	"Misty Circles Pt. 2 (Peel Session)"	3:22
9.	"Guilded Splinters (Live in Manchester)"	2:31
10.	"Don't Tell Me (Live in Manchester)"	4:23
11.	"Flowers (TV Version)"	5:28

Let Them Drag My Soul Away - abridged LP release.

Side A

No.	Title	Length
1.	"It's Been Hours Now"	4:16
2.	"The Stranger"	4:23
3.	"Some Of That"	5:57
4.	"Nowhere to Nowhere"	2:35
5.	"Whirlpool"	4:16

Side B

No.	Title	Length
1.	"Selfish Side (Demo)"	2:28
2.	"Far Too Hard (Demo 2nd Mix)"	4:10
3.	"Give It To Me (Demo)"	3:23
4.	"What I Want (Demo)"	4:49
5.	"Misty Circles (Demo)"	9:10

== Charts ==
Chart (2024)	Peak position
UK Independent Albums Chart	5
UK Physical Albums Chart	23
UK Albums Sales Chart	25
UK Record Store Chart	36
Scottish Albums Chart	37

== Running Wild - The Inevitable Years ==
Running Wild - The Inevitable Years

Compilation album by Dead or Alive
- Released: 31 May 2024
- Recorded: 1980–1982
- Studio: Pink Studio; Cargo Studios; Langham 1; Maida Vale 4
- Genre: Post-punk; Hi-NRG
- Label: Cherry Red Records
- Producer: Noddy Knowler, Dead or Alive, Ian Broudie

Following the abridged vinyl release of Let Them Drag My Soul Away, Cherry Red announced the release of the vinyl-only Running Wild - The Inevitable Years compilation in March 2024, with a release date of "late May". Capturing "one of the earliest explorers of the post-punk Goth scene," and "the band [who] caught the attention of the ever-reliable John Peel, and recorded material for his seminal BBC Radio One programme," the release compiles a selection of these recordings and two of the singles the band released on Inevitable, I'm Falling and Number Eleven. Running Wild - The Inevitable Years was released on May 31, 2024.

=== Track listing ===
Side A: The Singles

No.	Title	Length
1.	"I'm Falling"	4:34
2.	"Flowers"	5:58
3.	"Number Eleven"	4:53
4.	"Namegame (Live Version)"	3:59

Side B: Peel Sessions

No.	Title	Length
1.	"Nowhere to Nowhere"	2:49
2.	"Running Wild"	3:55
3.	"Number Twelve"	3:56
4.	"Number Eleven"	4:47
5.	"Flowers"	6:59

=== Critical reception ===
Nick James of God Is In The TV noted that the "tracks on Running Wild capture the band in the first 2 years since their formation and rather than peddling pop, these sounds have a feel of Gothic menace and the alternative night at the local rock club," adding that the release was "a worthwhile contribution to any record collection."
