= Moderates (band) =

Liverpudlian band

The Moderates were a Liverpool band who had a large local following in the late 1970s and early 1980s and championed by John Peel on his BBC Radio 1 show (the band supported John Peel's Roadshow date at Liverpool University on 2 September 1978).

The band's lineup consisted of John Brady (vocals, keyboards), Heidi Kure (vocals), Phil Allen (drums), Tom Gould (guitar), Bobby Carr (guitar, violin) and Mike Pursey (bass, later of Dead or Alive).

The Moderates also recorded a John Peel session on 25 March 1981 at the BBC's Maida Vale Studios, produced by Dale Griffin (Mott the Hoople). The session was transmitted on 20 April that year.

== Discography ==
- "Fetishes" (1980), Open-Eye Records OE EP 1001
- "Yes to the Neutron Bomb" / "Bus Girl" (1981), Hyped Records 51
- "Emile" / "For What It's Worth" (1981), Hyped Records BMRB 53
