= Pete Burns =

English singer (1959–2016)

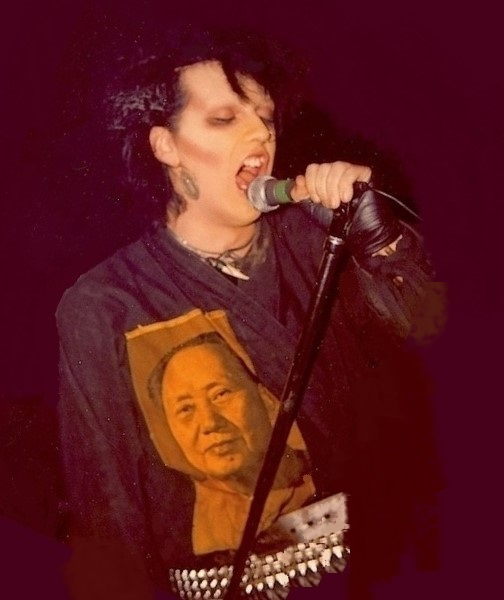
- Burns in 1980
- Born: Peter Jozzeppi Burns; 5 August 1959; Port Sunlight, Cheshire, England
- Died: 23 October 2016 (aged 57); London, England
- Resting place: West London Crematorium
- Occupations: Singer; songwriter; television personality and presenter
- Years active: 1977–2016
- Spouses: Lynne Corlett (m. 1980; div. 2006); Michael Simpson (m. 2007)
- Musical career
- Genres: Pop rock; Eurodisco; Hi-NRG; dance-pop; new wave; synth-pop
- Instruments: Vocals; percussion; melodica
- Works: Dead or Alive discography
- Labels: Epic; Sony Japan; Cleopatra; Avex Trax
- Formerly of: Dead or Alive

Peter Jozzeppi Burns (5 August 1959 – 23 October 2016) was an English singer, songwriter and television personality.

Burns formed the band Dead or Alive in 1980 during the new wave era and was the band's lead vocalist. Dead or Alive sold over 17 million albums and 36 million singles worldwide; their 1985 hit "You Spin Me Round (Like a Record)" became their first UK No. 1 hit single. The band had seven UK Top 40 singles, two US Top 20 singles and another two singles which went to No. 1 on the US Hot Dance Music/Club Play chart. In 2016, Billboard magazine ranked Dead or Alive as one of the most successful dance artists of all time.

Burns also released his own music as a solo artist, collaborated with other musicians, and appeared on television in reality shows. He received attention in the British media following his appearance on Celebrity Big Brother 4, finishing in fifth place. Burns was noted for his powerful, deep baritone voice along with his flamboyant dress style, eyepatch, and androgynous gender bender appearance. Though he avoided labelling himself, and despite the fact that he was married to a woman during the height of his fame, Burns has been referred to as a gay icon and an individual who helped bring gay music into mainstream popularity. Burns was also notable for his many cosmetic surgeries.

== Early life ==
Burns was born the younger of two children on 5 August 1959, in Port Sunlight, Wirral. Burns's mother, Evelina Maria Bettina Quittner Von Hudec, was born in Heidelberg, Germany, and, according to his autobiography, her first marriage was to a German Freiherr. As her father was Jewish, she moved to Vienna to escape the Nazis. At a tea dance in Vienna, she met an English soldier from Liverpool named Francis Burns. Until he was 5, Burns spoke only German which resulted in local children spending days outside his house shouting "Heil Hitler". From a young age, Burns developed a penchant for wearing costumes and he became obsessed with Native American culture going so far as to wear an Indian headdress constantly along with having his mother put up a tepee at his school playground. By his own admission, Burns was a lonely child who preferred drawing and painting to interacting with other children.

Burns stated that he inherited his love of fashion from his mother: "She'd do five costume changes a day and had a real thing about make-up. Every day at 5:30 a.m., she'd barricade herself into the front room and do her face." Burns also later described his mother's alcoholism, drug addiction, and multiple suicide attempts which were the result of her having suffered a nervous breakdown when she learned the fate of her family members during World War II. However, he maintained that she was "absolutely the best mother in the world" despite the child abuse he experienced:

I lived, I know now, a very solitary childhood. I had nothing to compare it with, so it seemed fine to me. I rarely left the house. I didn't need to; I had a secret world I shared with my mother. In those early years, I couldn't possibly have wished for a better friend. [...] She gave me the power to dream, the power to remove myself from where I might not be having any fun, and go inside my head and be somewhere else.

For Burns, school was "almost non-existent", and his mother frequently kept him away so he could spend the day with her. Burns was also endlessly taunted by teachers and peers, before being thrown out of school at 14 after being summoned to the headmaster's office because he had arrived at school with "no eyebrows, Harmony-red hair, and one gigantic earring". "I dropped out of school, because it got to be too dangerous for somebody who looked a little different. At that time, I was experimenting with hair dyes and stuff like that, and I was going to a particularly macho-oriented school and causing too much controversy." Summarising his time at school, Burns stated: "I learnt nothing at school. I hated it. I was just really into David Bowie so I shaved off my eyebrows and dyed my hair orange, I was alienated in the seventies at school." During this time, Burns was also raped by a man who drove him to Raby Mere and threatened him with an air gun. "I thought I should have been upset about that," wrote Burns. "But I wasn't."

== Career ==
=== Early career and band formation ===
Between 1977 and 1984, Burns worked as a shop assistant at Probe Records, a small independent record shop in Liverpool. Burns had been hired by Probe owner Geoff Davies due to his outlandish appearance (which included an "eighteenth-century shepherd's smock, an upside-down straw top hat with his dreads cascading out of the top, full make-up and massive heeled boots") that he hoped would attract customers. Burns later said that "Geoff only employed me for the glamour" and "people would travel from Wales and Leeds, just to look at me. They used to call me King – I was like King Punk." After being hired, Burns would lash out at customers if he disliked their music choices, behaviour which was encouraged by Davies. "I'm not lettin' yer waste yer money on that shite," Burns exclaimed to one customer who wanted to buy an LP record. BBC radio producer Graham Robertson recalled Burns's time at Probe:

Some kids were scared to go up to the counter when Pete was serving as he was acerbic and scathing but, overall, he was really funny. I personally relished going up to pay as it was always entertaining. My mates would often give me their records to pay for and I would place our selections on the counter and attempt to catch his eye – he was usually permanently immersed in an animated conversation and would often serve you without breaking from it!

Despite his later success, Burns did not have ambitions to be a singer and said that he hated the sound of his voice, wishing he had been able to sing falsetto like Sylvester. He also had an uncomfortable relationship with the corporate music industry and expressed disgust at the way it functioned. He always refused to allow record company staff to hear his music before it was completed, which "didn't make [the executives] very pleased" and refused to promote his work; "I used to let it sink or swim on its own."

In 1977, Burns formed a punk band with contemporaries Julian Cope, Pete Wylie, and Phil Hurst, calling themselves The Mystery Girls. They only had one performance (opening for Sham 69 at Eric's Club in Liverpool in November 1977) before disintegrating. Cope stated that Burns's performing style drew on that of the transgender punk performer Jayne County and Wylie recalled that "his head looked like someone had melted a load of black vinyl down into a kind of space quiff." Burns continued in early 1979 with a new band, Nightmares in Wax (originally called Rainbows Over Nagasaki), featuring a gothic post-punk sound, with backing from keyboardist Martin Healy, guitarist Mick Reid, bassist Rob Jones (who left to be replaced by Walter Ogden), and drummer Paul Hornby (who also exited after the band's formation to be replaced by Phil Hurst).

The group played their first gig supporting Wire at Eric's Club in July 1979, and recorded demos which included a cover of the Simon Dupree and the Big Sound song "Kites", a feature of their early shows. Although signed to the Eric's Records label, their only release, a three-track 7-inch EP titled Birth of a Nation, appeared in March 1980 on Inevitable Records. A 12-inch single featuring two of the tracks from the EP, "Black Leather" and "Shangri-La", was released in 1985. The EP featured "Black Leather", which turned halfway into KC and the Sunshine Band's "That's the Way (I Like It)".

An Eric's Club gig flyer from 1979 showing Nightmares in Wax as the supporting act for Simple Minds.

The band went through several line-up changes over the next three years while recording a series of independent singles. In 1980, after replacing several members, Burns changed the band's name to Dead or Alive. Dead or Alive's singles started charting on the UK Indie Chart, beginning with 1982's "The Stranger" reaching No. 7. This prompted major label Epic Records to sign the band in 1983. Their first release for Epic was the single "Misty Circles", which appeared at No. 100 on the major UK Singles Chart in 1983. Two more singles co-produced by Zeus B. Held ("What I Want" and "I'd Do Anything") were released but success continued to elude the band.

The band's debut album, Sophisticated Boom Boom, was released in May 1984 and featured their first Top 40 UK single, "That's the Way (I Like It)", a cover of the 1975 hit by KC and the Sunshine Band. That song, along with "Misty Circles", were also hits on the US Hot Dance Music/Club Play chart. The album was a minor success in the UK, where it peaked at No. 29. As Burns and his band achieved greater media exposure, his eccentric and androgynous appearance often led to comparisons with Culture Club and its lead singer Boy George as well as "Calling Your Name" singer Marilyn. Burns described producing his first album as "the most joyous experience of my life, full of happy memories, because there was no commercial pressure on us."

During his time in Liverpool, Burns became acquainted with Courtney Love shortly after she moved to the area in 1982 using money from a small trust fund. When Burns became "the local celebrity punk", he remembered how Love "would call me all sorts of names on the street and it got to the stage where I just sort of loved her for that. She had, like, a complete lack of respect for the divinity I had in the city at the time." Boy George, in his autobiography Take It Like a Man, said that Burns was "a local disco celebrity in Liverpool, like Philip Sallon in London." He also noted, "I'd never met Burns, but knew of his reputation for being evil." Along with working at Probe, Burns also worked as a clothes designer and was the owner of a small fashion shop in Liverpool's Cases Street. Burns often informed his customers that the clothes they bought from him were "crap", even going so far as to mock people he spotted around town wearing his designs.

=== Chart success ===
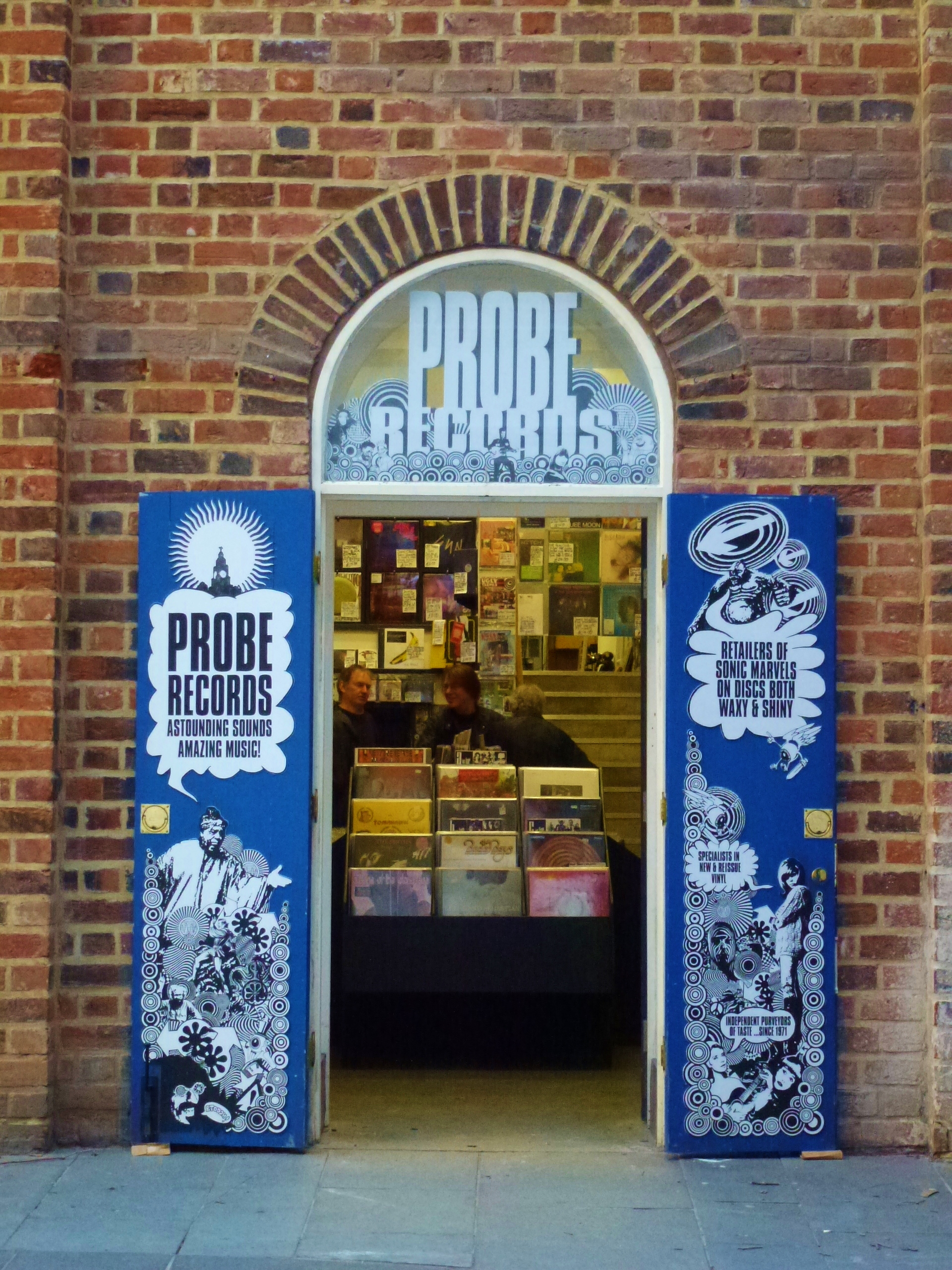
Probe Records located at Bluecoat Chambers, 2010

The band released its second album Youthquake (US No. 31, UK No. 9) in May 1985, produced by the then-fledgling production team of Mike Stock, Matt Aitken, and Pete Waterman, known as Stock Aitken Waterman (SAW). Desiring to move on from the sound of the band's debut studio album, Sophisticated Boom Boom, Burns wanted "You Spin Me Round (Like a Record)" to be produced by the little-known team, in the Hi-NRG style of their 1984 UK hits "You Think You're a Man" by Divine, and "Whatever I Do (Wherever I Go)" by Hazell Dean. Recording of the single was plagued by arguments between the band and producers, but became the band's only song to reach No. 1 on the UK Singles Chart after lingering outside the Top 40 for over two months. The song proved to be SAW's first chart-topping single. The track also hit No. 11 in the US and No. 1 in Canada.

In a 2009 interview discussing the song, Burns disputed the Hi-NRG label, saying "to me it was just disco", and describing the song as "a pop hit, not a hi-NRG hit". Burns later said he had wanted to make a "glittery disco record", while Waterman, asked to define the song's sound, said it was "techno-disco; without a question that's what it was. It was new technology playing Motown; that's all it was. Taking out the musicians and bringing in technology for the first time." Burns would later criticise SAW for their methods, describing that "they took our sound and just basically wheeled it off with a load of other imbeciles, and that makes me a bit sour." Burns stated in his autobiography that he composed "You Spin Me Round (Like a Record)" by using two existing songs:

How did I write "Spin Me"? I listened to Luther Vandross's 'I Wanted Your Love'. It's not the same chord structure, but then that's the way I make music – I hear something and I sing another tune over it. I didn't sit and study the Luther Vandross album – I heard the song and it locked. [...] I'm trying to structure the music and I know what I want. [...] It's like do this, do this, do this – and suddenly it hits. I don't want to do Luther Vandross's song, but I can still sing the same pattern over it. And there was another record, by Little Nell, called "See You 'Round Like a Record". [...] So I had those two, Van Dross [sic] and Little Nell and – bingo! – done deal.

— Pete Burns, Freak Unique (2007)

Burns claimed the song was "completed" by the time the producers were then chosen to work on it, stating that "the record companies don't trust a band to go into the studio without a producer". However, according to Burns, the record company was unenthusiastic about the single to such an extent that Burns had to take out a £2,500 loan to record it. Afterward, he recalled, "the record company said it was awful" and the band had to fund production of the song's video themselves. Additionally, Burns said that 12-inch singles comprised over 70% of the original sales of "You Spin Me Round", and because these were regarded by the record label as promotional tools rather than sales, the band had to threaten legal action against the label before they received the royalties on them.

Other album tracks released as singles included "Lover Come Back To Me" (No. 11), "In Too Deep" (No. 14), and "My Heart Goes Bang (Get Me to the Doctor)" (No. 23) which all reached the UK Top 30. Despite the international chart-topping success of Youthquake and its lead single, Burns said it was the album that he was "most dissatisfied with" and recalled that "one of the unhappiest days of my life was when Spin Me reached No. 1 – and I mean really unhappy. Because I knew it would be downhill all the way after that." Burns had a fear of success and hoped that his singles would not chart highly. "I didn't want too high positions because I didn't want to lose my life," he recalled. "I thought, if it happens it happens, but if it doesn't – phew!"

In late 1986, Dead or Alive released their third album, Mad, Bad and Dangerous to Know (US No. 52, UK No. 27). Production of the album was marred by more fights between the band and SAW, with the latter frustrated by the band's refusal to branch into house music, and Burns being unwilling to hand over songwriting duties to the producers. SAW's recording engineer Karen Hewitt recalled the singer appeared to thrive on his often explosive and confrontational dynamic with Stock and Aitken during the album sessions. Aitken confessed to struggling with Burns' vocal experimentation on the second SAW-produced album, including what he described as the introduction of a displeasing yodel.

The lead single "Brand New Lover" became a modest UK hit, peaking at No. 31, but was more successful in the US, where it reached No. 15 on the US Hot 100, and No. 1 on the US Billboard dance chart. Following a fraught six-month recording session with producers Stock Aitken Waterman, which was marked by fights and disagreements between the band, record company and producers over the sound of their new material, Burns claimed he struggled to get Epic to commit to a release schedule for the single. He said this changed when Bananarama had major success with their Dead or Alive-inspired cover of "Venus", which Burns claimed encouraged the label to schedule "Brand New Lover" for release. Later, Burns blamed the song's disappointing chart run in his home country on his then-ongoing war with his UK label, alleging that the company had failed to press and distribute enough copies of the single to make it a hit, and claiming the band had lost out on 67,000 UK sales as a result.

Three more singles from the album were released, the most successful in the UK was "Something in My House" (No. 12), tonally Gothic and with a sleeve depicting Burns in front of what appears to be a Satanic altar, featuring an inverted cross. Originally conceived by Burns as a Halloween release, the horror-themed "Something in My House" was delayed until late December in the UK, amid wrangling between the band and their record company, with the latter feeling the track was "too brutal" to be a single.

Clashes between the band and the label continued over the song's music video, with Epic Records reportedly objecting to a "mildly suggestive" sequence involving Burns and a banana. "By the time we got to 'Something in My House', I felt I wanted to express myself on film, as well as record, amuse myself, show my sense of humour," Burns wrote on the liner notes to his Evolution: The Videos compilation DVD. "Well apparently the manner in which I 'peeled a banana' seemed to work against me/us! And, it was downhill all the way after that."

Recording of the song was also fraught, with Burns alleging that producer Mike Stock erased his original vocal take after objecting to the singer's use of the phrase "wicked queen"; a lyrical double entendre implying reference to a gay relationship. "We would butt heads so fucking badly; it was unbelievable," Burns told journalist James Arena in his book Europe's Stars of 80s Dance Pop. "That's why we eventually walked away from them. For instance, there was a lyric from 'Something in My House' where I make reference to a wicked queen. "The actual producer, Mike Stock stopped me and said I couldn't use that term because it would mean the record is about gay people. I was like, 'Fuck this, it's going on!' They actually wiped the original vocal, but then Pete Waterman came back and said, 'Let him do it the way he wants to.'"

Despite the reservations of the label and producers, the track proved to be Dead or Alive's biggest hit in the UK since "Lover Come Back to Me" and was the only single from their third album to earn a UK Top 20 placement. The song also proved to be the act's final Top 40 hit with an original release in the UK, and their last Top 20 hit in Australia. A 12-inch version of the song, the "Mortevicar Mix", featured scenes from Nosferatu and sampling of dialogue from the soundtrack of The Exorcist and a sampling from the trailer of George A. Romero's film Day of the Dead. Another highly controversial 12-inch white label mix, known as "Naughty XXX", was released to club DJs, featuring a series of stronger dialogue clips from The Exorcist – with the track described as "unique" in its capacity as the only known example of a "filthy, obscene [and] sexually explicit" Stock Aitken Waterman record. A third single, "Hooked on Love", failed to make the UK Top 40 amid Burns' battle with the label over their refusal to prioritise his preferred mix, which featured a "Gothic" overtone.

In 1986, Burns recommended model Mandy Smith to Waterman. Smith was already well-known in the British tabloids due to her relationship with Rolling Stones bassist Bill Wyman, which started when she was 13. Smith became the very first artist signed to Waterman's PWL Records in September 1986 when she was 16 years old. In 1987, Dead or Alive released their greatest hits album Rip It Up, and a concert tour of the same name with dates in Europe, the United States, and Japan. Film footage was recorded at two shows at Tokyo's Nippon Budokan on 9 October and at Osaka's Osaka-jō Hall on 11 October, and released on video cassette (VHS) and Laserdisc that same year under the title Rip It Up Live. The concert was eventually issued as bonus material for the first time on DVD as part of the 2003 compilation release. Due to their immense popularity in the region, Michael Jackson was forced to reschedule his Japanese tour dates during his Bad World Tour so as not to conflict with Dead or Alive. One contemporary Japanese newspaper even ran the headline, "Forget Madonna, we've got Pete Burns!"

External videos
- Dead or Alive - Rip It Up 1987
- Dead or Alive - Disco In Dream 1989
- Dead or Alive - Full Evolution 2003

During this time, Burns turned down offers to tour with Madonna for her Who's That Girl World Tour as well as with Bon Jovi to be with his mother when she was diagnosed with terminal cancer. Burns later recalled: "A manager left an answerphone message telling me, 'If you don't want your career to die of cancer like your mother, you should pack your bags.'" Burns's mother died in 1987 and her death led Burns to struggle to write new musical material. This, coupled along with his tour refusals, adversely affected his music career and caused him to subsequently reduce his public profile in later years. "I felt, well, nothing's worth going on for," he stated. "I had a nervous breakdown after she died and couldn't work."

In mid-1988, Dead or Alive released the self-produced Nude (US No. 106, UK No. 82). In 2021, Retropop Magazine retrospectively described Nude as the "perfect Dead or Alive album" and "their strongest offering overall". During the album's production Tim Lever and Mike Percy were fired from the band. The pair later formed careers as mixers and producers; both owned and operated Steelworks Studios in Sheffield and experienced success writing and mixing songs for acts like S Club 7, Blue, and Robbie Williams. From the information booklet in Sophisticated Boom Box MMXVI, Burns stated:

During the first couple of months of writing and recording, Mike and Tim seemed to be acting a little distant and insular, and after a bit of investigation, we discovered that they were building their own professional recording studio where they lived. When we asked why, they said they wanted to move into concentrating on record production work on their own, didn't want to be in a band and touring and away from their families all of the time and say they were leaving the band at the end of the Nude album recording! Well, excuse me boys, but I don't tolerate disloyalty and people making plans behind my back. I discussed it with Steve, and he and I decided that we didn't want them working half-heartedly on an album that we knew had to be the very best we could make, so we fired them on the spot, and told them to go concentrate on giving 100% to their new career as producers. It was a tough decision to make, but they made the decision for us.

"I like what I'm doing. It pleases me and if other people like it, it's a bonus."

— Burns in an unaired 1988 interview with MTV promoting his album, Nude.

The album featured the single "Turn Around and Count 2 Ten", which reached No. 2 in the US Hot Dance Club Songs chart and No. 1 for a record-breaking seventeen weeks in Japan. It was followed by the singles "Baby Don't Say Goodbye", which peaked at No. 6 on the Billboard Dance Club Songs chart and "Come Home with Me Baby", which spent thirteen weeks at No. 1 on the US Hot Dance Music/Club Play due to a popular remix by producer Lewis Martineé. However, "Come Home with Me Baby" and the other singles struggled in the UK. This was attributed to the lyrics of the song, which encouraged casual sex during the AIDs epidemic.

Additionally, despite strong customer demand, the US record company refused to release it as a proper single (claiming they objected to the male dancers in the music video), which prevented the song from becoming a hit on the Billboard Hot 100. In 1989, to support his Nude album and the release of its companion remix album Nude – Remade Remodelled, Burns toured with fellow Stock Aitken Waterman acts Sinitta and Kylie Minogue in Asia and Europe on the ensemble Disco in Dream concert tour. On 6 October, Burns gave a performance at the Tokyo Dome, the largest concert venue in Japan (with a seating capacity of 55,000 people), which was broadcast on the NHK television network.

=== 1990s and 2000s ===
In 1990, the band produced their next studio album, Fan the Flame (Part 1), although their only successful record deal was in Japan where the album peaked at No. 27 on the Japanese Albums Chart. The band had begun to produce Fan the Flame (Part 2), however the album was shelved until it was finished in 2021. An acoustic album Love, Pete was also made available during a US personal appearance tour in 1992 and was widely bootlegged with the title Fan the Flame (Part 2): The Acoustic Sessions. Burns strongly criticised its subsequent distribution.

In the early 1990s, Burns and Steve Coy signed with Waterman's PWL Records and recording was started on new tracks co-written and produced by Stock, but the sessions were aborted when Stock abruptly quit over his dissatisfaction with his share of publishing royalties on the new material. Work on new material recommenced with PWL staffer Barry Stone taking over co-production duties. The band released a new single in 1994, a cover version of David Bowie's "Rebel Rebel", under the name International Chrysis, named after the late transsexual nightclub performer. An initial demo of the track, which featured new lyrics written by Burns, was blocked by Bowie – who legally denied permission to use new lyrics, and also unsuccessfully requested the track not be covered by Burns at all.

Remixed versions of tracks from Fan the Flame (Part 1) were later re-recorded for the band's 1995 Nukleopatra album, which was their sixth studio album. While the album was released as scheduled in Japan, the planned European release was pulled when Burns left PWL Records after Waterman refused his request to use Paul Oakenfold and other remixers to work on further singles, and instead insisted he wanted to write and produce for the band himself. In 1997, Burns claimed that some of the song covers were included as "album fillers" after studio time to write new material was cut short when "the record label started to fall to bits".

In 2000, Dead or Alive released Fragile, a collection of remakes with several new tracks and covers including U2's "Even Better Than the Real Thing" and Nick Kamen's "I Promised Myself". The first song on the album, "Hit and Run Lover", was a hit single, peaking at No. 2 on the Japanese charts. A new remix album, Unbreakable: The Fragile Remixes, was released in 2001. This was followed in 2003 with a greatest hits album entitled Evolution: the Hits along with a video compilation that was also released on DVD. "You Spin Me Round (Like a Record)" was re-released as a single to promote the album with it reaching No. 23 on the UK Singles Chart.

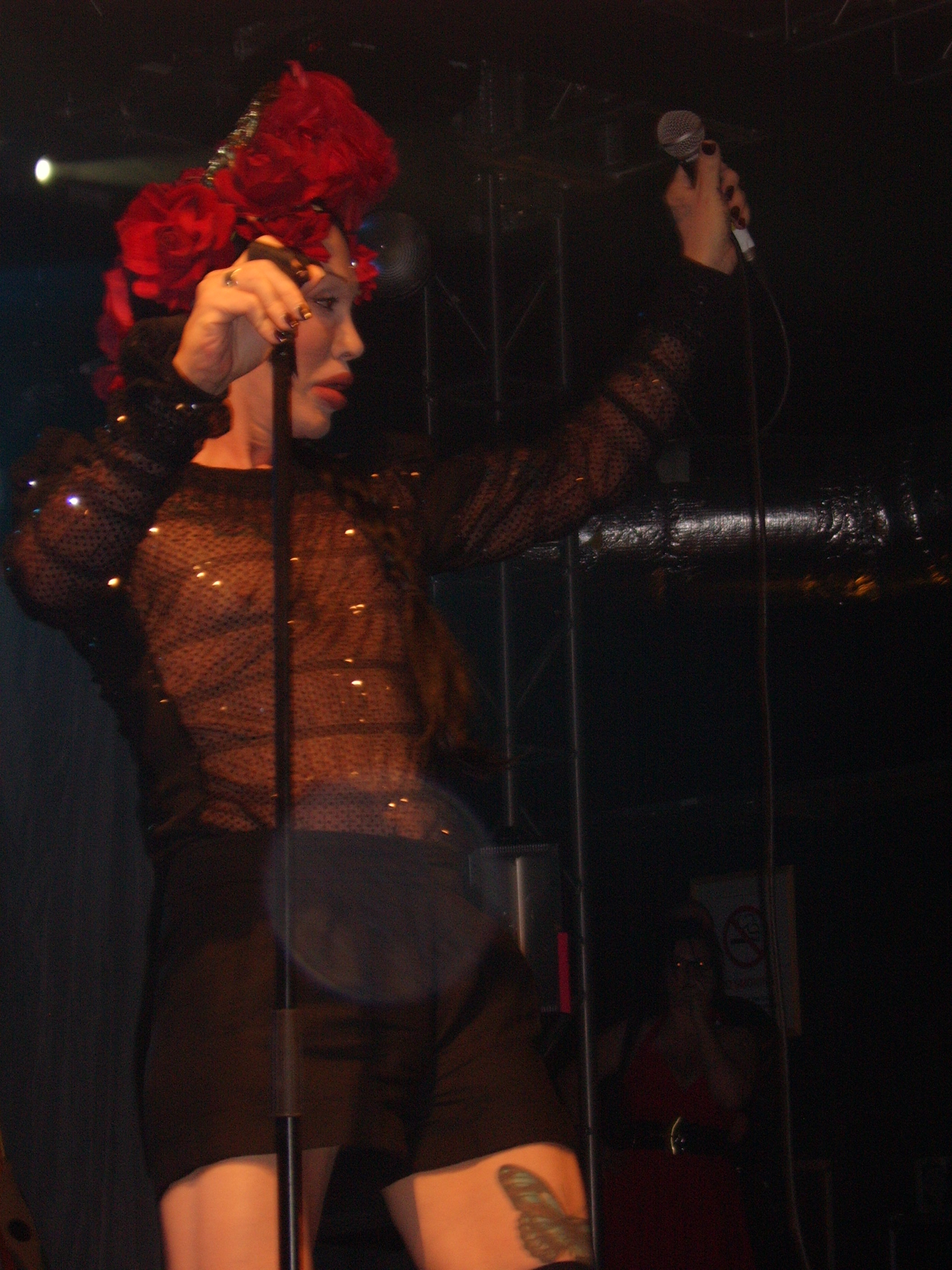
Burns performing at the Carling Academy Liverpool, 2008

=== Solo music career and collaborations ===
In 1994, Burns collaborated with the Italian Eurodance-duo Glam to produce the single "Sex Drive", which was later re-recorded for Nukleopatra. The original version topped at number 12 in Italy.

In 1999, Burns covered Madonna's song "Why's It So Hard" from Erotica for Virgin Voices: A Tribute to Madonna, a compilation album featuring various artists covering her most iconic songs.

In 2004, Burns enjoyed solo success with the Pet Shop Boys-produced track "Jack and Jill Party". The track reached No. 75 in the UK Singles Chart.

On 7 September 2010, Burns's solo single "Never Marry an Icon", produced and co-written by the Dirty Disco, was released to the iTunes Store. The single was released by band member Steve Coy's label, Bristar Records. That year, Burns also appeared with Dutch Eurodance group Vengaboys in the music video for their song "Rocket to Uranus".

=== Media career ===
In December 2003, the BBC apologised to its viewers after Burns swore once on its pre-9pm watershed Liquid News show when asked about his views on the Michael Jackson trial. Burns also appeared in the first episode of the ninth series of the UK version of Celebrity Wife Swap. His partner Michael Simpson went to live with former Page 3 model Leah Newman, while Burns lived with Newman's partner, the footballer Neil Ruddock. On 2 November 2006, Burns presented an ITV program titled Pete Burns' Cosmetic Surgery Nightmares. From 8 October 2007, to 5 December 2007, Pete's PA aired on Living following Burns as he searched for a new personal assistant (PA). In 2008, Burns was also the subject of an episode for the show Psychic Therapy on the Biography Channel where he was interviewed by medium Gordon Smith.

In January 2006, Burns appeared on Channel 4's Celebrity Big Brother 4, eventually reaching fifth on the show's final episode. During the program, he declared that one of his coats was made out of gorilla fur. This caused outrage among animal rights activists as unlicensed gorilla fur is illegal in the United Kingdom. Police subsequently confiscated the coat and tests were performed on it that revealed that it was not gorilla but was made out of the fur of colobus monkeys, which are an endangered species whose fur requires a licence, although experts believed that the fur had been imported before it became illegal to import colobus fur in 1975. Burns acted as a co-host on the 2013 E4 show The Body Shocking Show and that same year he also co-hosted an episode of Celebrity Wedding Planner. His final musical performance was on Big Brother's Bit on the Side in February 2016 with his last public appearance being on Celebrity Botched Up Bodies in September 2016.

== Private life ==
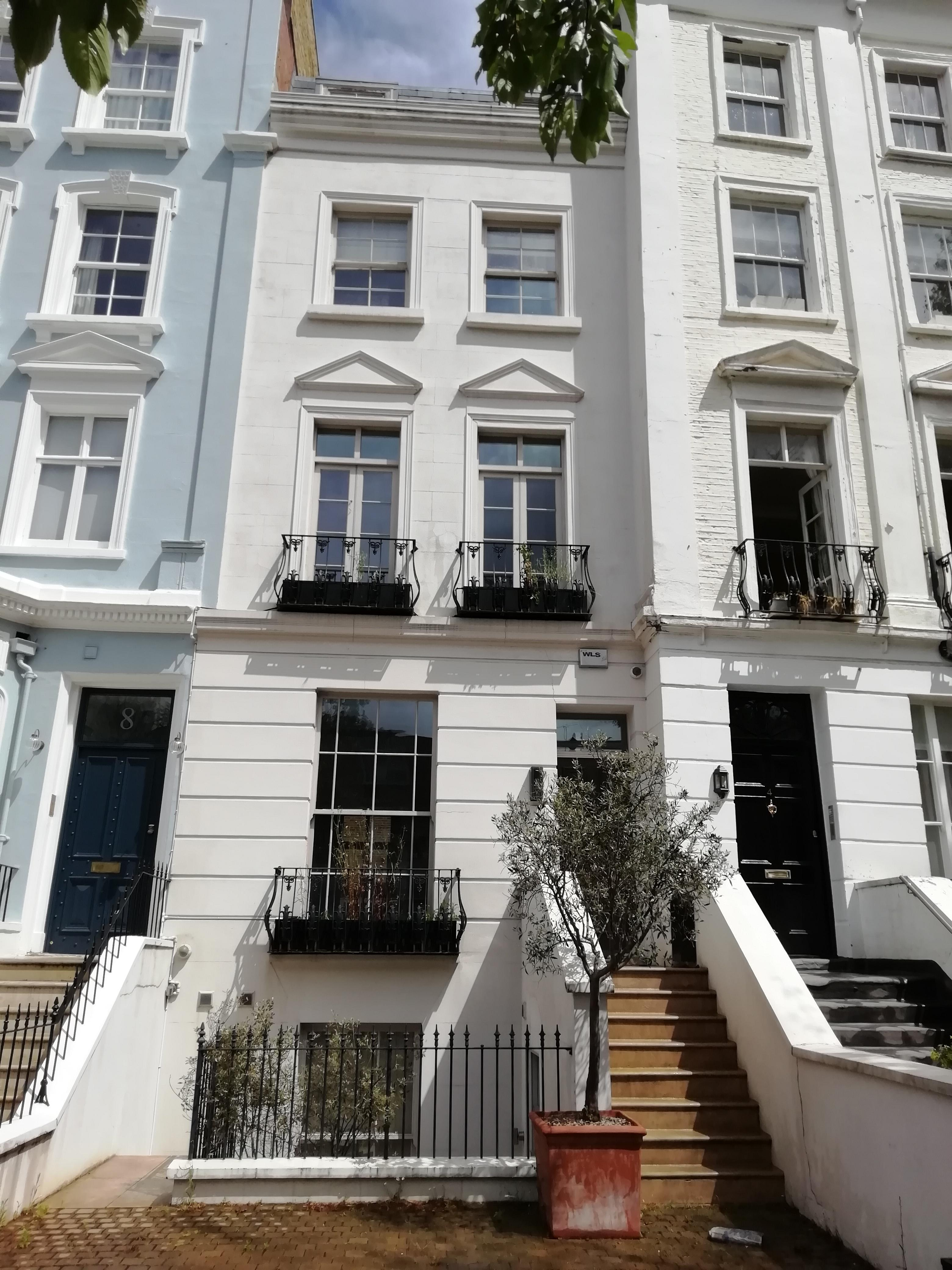
Burns's former house in Notting Hill Gate, London, W11

=== Relationships ===
Burns married Lynne Corlett in Liverpool on 8 August 1980 after having met her in a hair salon where they both worked. "I was immediately attracted to Pete," Corlett later said. "He was as outrageous as I was, and we both had so much in common. At first, they [Corlett's parents] thought Pete was just a gay friend of mine. They thought he was sweet and nice. But they didn't like it when they found out we were serious." Discussing their wedding, Burns said: "The only thing that spoiled it was that the man in the registry office had to go and make a feeble joke by asking which one of us was the bride."

Burns and Corlett divorced in 2006. In 2007, Burns entered into a civil partnership with Michael Simpson. Corlett has said that Burns began his relationship with Simpson while he was still married, and that she was aware of it. She added that Burns was "very honest" about his relationship with Simpson and that the divorce was "very amicable". Simpson died in 2026.

=== Gender and sexuality ===
On his sexuality, Burns stated, "[People] always want to know – am I gay, bi, trans or what? I say, forget all that. There's got to be a completely different terminology and I'm not aware if it's been invented yet. I'm just Pete." He was proud of being a man and was once quoted "It freaks me that someone could think I was a woman. Don't get me wrong – I love women; I love men, too, and I'm very proud to be a man."

=== Health and legal issues ===
Burns was known for his addiction to cosmetic surgery. In a 2016 interview, he said: "The number of surgeries I've had is probably 300. I hope when I'm 80 and I get to heaven God doesn't recognise me."

Burns had his first cosmetic procedure (a rhinoplasty) in 1984. He explained: "I realised I was going to be a visual entity and that I had to look good. I had a broken nose. In the punk days somebody head butted me in Liverpool, and it went over to one side. When you're young, self-conscious and standing in front of a camera and the photographers are whispering, 'Can we just turn his head to the left because he's got a lump on his nose,' you think, 'Well, I'll do something about it'." According to Burns: "The operation was a disaster — my nose completely caved in on one side. I'm at home recovering, when I get a call telling me I'm on Top of the Pops next Tuesday. That's why I had to wear that eyepatch. It wasn't a fashion statement, it was practical."

Despite the botched rhinoplasty, Burns would go on to have extensive polyacrylamide injections into his lips, cheek implants, many more rhinoplasties, and a number of tattoos. Burns once said, "I see myself as my own clay, and I was remodelling it".

In early 2006, Burns revealed that he had spent his life savings on 18 months of reconstructive surgery after a cosmetic procedure on his lips went wrong. The botched lip augmentation led to an infection in his lips caused by the injectable filler used and it spread to the rest of his face, leaving holes in his skin which would excrete yellow fluid. Additional surgery-related health problems experienced by Burns included pulmonary embolisms and near-fatal blood clots.

Paparazzi followed Burns around after his arrest for assault in 2006 (the charges were later dropped).

In January 2007, Burns sued Maurizio Viel, the cosmetic surgeon who performed his faulty lip surgery, for £1 million. He eventually agreed to settle the case out-of-court for £450,000.

In March 2009, Burns was admitted to a London hospital after collapsing from a kidney ailment. He was diagnosed with seven large kidney stones. The kidney stones were removed with laser surgery.

Burns was declared bankrupt in December 2014 and was evicted from a rented flat in April 2015 for non-payment of over £34,000 in rent.

== Death, funeral and legacy ==
Burns died in London following a sudden cardiac arrest on 23 October 2016, at the age of 57. Burns was due to appear on the British talk show Loose Women on 24 October to promote the Sophisticated Boom Box MMXVI box set, but pulled out the week prior due to "ill health". In May 2016, Burns had sparked concerns when he was seen in public appearing bloated and dishevelled.

People who paid tribute to him after his death included Boy George, who described Burns as "one of our great true eccentrics", Scissor Sisters frontman Jake Shears, who described Burns as a "true original, a treasure of a human being" and former MP George Galloway, who had appeared with him on Celebrity Big Brother and said Burns was "a cross between Oscar Wilde and Dorothy Parker... you don't get more brilliant than that."

Soft Cell musician Marc Almond tweeted: "We've had some mad times with Pete but he was a one off creation, a fabulous, fantastic, brilliant creature and always sweet to me." Joe Musker, a former Dead or Alive drummer, told BBC Radio 5 Live: "He was the ace face in Liverpool. He was just so flamboyant and just right out there with his dress and that. He always looked absolutely amazing and it was a pleasure to work with him."

On 29 October, the opening celebrity dance routine for BBC's Strictly Come Dancing was performed to "You Spin Me Round (Like a Record)". After the number, hosts Claudia Winkleman and Tess Daly paid tribute to Burns and sent their condolences to his family. Boy George paid for the costs of his funeral, despite the two artists' rivalry during their parallel music careers, and that Burns accused him of appropriating his image.

In 2023, "You Spin Me Round (Like a Record)" was covered by Netta as part of the Eurovision Song Contest 2023 tribute to music from Liverpool. On New Year's Eve 2023, English media personality and presenter of Big Brother's Bit on the Side, Rylan Clark, sang the song in a duet with Rick Astley, and danced with him, on Astley's BBC One New Year's Eve special.

In 2024, previously unseen photographs of Burns were put on display in an exhibition entitled Total Stranger in his hometown of Port Sunlight. Photographer and former Dead or Alive manager Francesco Mellina said the display was "a tribute to Pete and his career". Jean Milton, curator of the exhibition and Director of Heritage at Port Sunlight Village Trust, said: "This exhibition will hopefully bring Pete to a whole new audience and inspire a new generation to be true to who they are and not be afraid to create their own path."

== Published works ==
=== Books ===
- Burns, Pete (2006). Freak Unique: My Autobiography. John Blake Publishing. ISBN 978-1844-542-987.

=== Videography ===
Title	Album details
Rip It Up Live	Release date: 1988; Label: Sony BMG; Formats: VHS, Laserdisc
Evolution	Release date: 2003; Label: Sony BMG; Formats: DVD

== Discography ==
=== Dead or Alive discography ===
- Sophisticated Boom Boom (1984)
- Youthquake (1985)
- Mad, Bad and Dangerous to Know (1986)
- Nude (1988)
- Fan the Flame (Part 1) (1990)
- Nukleopatra (1995)
- Fragile (2000)
- Fan the Flame (Part 2): The Resurrection (2021)

=== Solo discography ===
- Love, Pete (1992)

==== Singles ====
Year	Title	Peak chart positions			
Year	Title	UK	UK Dance	UK Indie	Italy
1994	"Sex Drive" (with Glam)	—			12
2004	"Jack and Jill Party" (with Pet Shop Boys)	75	6	15	—
2010	"Never Marry an Icon"	—			—
"—" denotes releases that did not chart

== Sources ==
- Burns, Pete; Cranna, Ian (2007). Freak Unique, My Autobiography (1 (paperback) ed.). John Blake Publishing. ISBN 978-1-84454-438-7.
