= I'd Do Anything =

I'd Do Anything may refer to:

- I'd Do Anything (2004 TV series), a 2004 American reality series that aired on ESPN
- I'd Do Anything (2008 TV series), a 2008 talent show-themed television series that aired on the BBC
- "I'd Do Anything" (Oliver! song), from the musical Oliver!
- "I'd Do Anything" (Simple Plan song)
- "I'd Do Anything" (Dead or Alive song)
