= Fan the Flame (Part 2): The Resurrection =

2021 album by Dead or Alive

Studio album by Dead or Alive
- Released: 29 October 2021
- Recorded: 1990–1994
- Genres: Hi-NRG; synthpop
- Label: Demon Music Group
- Producers: Dead or Alive; Craig Hardy; Steve Coy; Marina Zacco Coy

Dead or Alive chronology
Sophisticated Boom Box MMXVI (2016)	Fan the Flame (Part 2): The Resurrection (2021)	Let Them Drag My Soul Away: Singles, Demos, Sessions and Live Recordings 1979–1982 (2023)

Singles from Fan the Flame (Part 2)
- 1. "Tonight" Released: 2021

Fan the Flame (Part 2): The Resurrection is the eighth and final album by British band Dead or Alive, released on 29 October 2021. The songs were originally recorded in 1992 as a follow-up to Fan the Flame (Part 1) but cancelled prior to completion. The recordings were completed by producer Craig Hardy, following discussions with Pete Burns and Steve Coy prior to their deaths, and with the help of Coy's estate.

== Reception ==
The release peaked at #21 in the UK independent album chart and #17 in the UK record store chart.

Retro Pop Magazine gave the album three and a half stars out of five, noting that "some tracks hold up better than others" and that "some of the tracks are undercooked". However, it was noted that "the album excels, with the instrumentals and Pete’s vibrant vocals clean and fresh, like stepping back into the ‘90s."

== Track listing ==
The 2CD deluxe edition contains an extra disc of instrumentals.

No.	Title	Length
1.	"Tonight..."	4:01
2.	"U Were Meant 4 Me"	4:43
3.	"Are U Ready 2 B Heartbroken"	4:02
4.	"Where Is the Love"	3:57
5.	"I Don't Care About Your Heart"	6:04
6.	"I Want 2 B with U"	4:01
7.	"Hurt Me (Did U Have 2 Hurt Me)"	4:28
8.	"Extacy"	3:59
9.	"Tonight..." (Extended Version)	6:03
10.	"Hurt Me (Did U Have 2 Hurt Me)" (Extended Version)	6:54

== Personnel ==
- Music – Pete Burns, Steve Coy
- Producer – Steve Coy
- Engineered, arranged, mixed & additional production – Craig Hardy
- Art direction, design – Oink Creative
- Executive producer, liner notes – Marina Zacco Coy
- Mastered – Phil Kinrade
- Photography – Paul Cox
