= Sex Drive (Dead or Alive song) =

Single by Dead or Alive

from the album Nukleopatra
- Released: 10 March 1997
- Recorded: 1994–1996
- Genre: Synthpop
- Length: 4:22
- Label: Sony Music Entertainment
- Songwriters: Pete Burns; Steve Coy

Dead or Alive singles chronology
"You Spin Me Round (Like a Record) (1996 Remix)" (1996)	"Sex Drive" (1997)	"Hit and Run Lover" (2001)

Music video
- "Sex Drive" on YouTube

"Sex Drive" is a song by British band Dead or Alive from their 1995 album Nukleopatra. The single was a minor hit in Australia, where it peaked at No. 52 in March 1997. The song was originally released by Glam in 1994, with Burns as a guest vocalist, but it was re-recorded and remixed for the album. The original version peaked at number 12 in Italy in May 1994 and both Glam and Pete Burns attended the song competition "Un disco per l'estate" that year in which they performed the song for the first time.

== Track listing ==
=== GLAM version ===
Italy 1994

1. "Sex Drive" (Glam Drivin' Remix) - 5:07
2. "Sex Drive" (Drivin' Instrumental Remix) - 4:24
3. "Sex Drive" (D.J. Ricci Hard Remix) - 4:18
4. "Sex Drive" (Sexual Hard Remix) - 4:11
5. "Sex Drive" (Acappella) - 1:32

=== CD single ===
Japan 1995

1. "Sex Drive" - 6:39
2. "Rebel Rebel" - 4:18

Australia 1997

1. "Sex Drive" (Radio Edit) – 4:22
2. "Sex Drive" (Sugar Pumpers Radio Extended Mix) – 5:55
3. "Sex Drive" (Album Version) – 5:13
4. "What I Want" – 5:25

=== CD maxi ===
Australia

1. "Sex Drive" (Peewee's Radio Mix) – 4:09
2. "Sex Drive" (Peewee's Extended Remix) – 9:35
3. "Sex Drive" (Sugar Pumpers Radio Extended Mix) – 5:54
4. "You Spin Me Round (Like a Record)" (Tyme vs Hoops Club Mix) – 6:47
5. "Come Home (With Me Baby)" (12" Mix) – 6:19

== Chart performance ==
Chart (May 1994)	Peak position
Italy (FIMI)	12

Chart (1997)	Peak position
Australia (ARIA)	52
