= In Too Deep (Dead or Alive song) =

Song by Dead or Alive

Single by Dead or Alive

from the album Youthquake
- B-side: "I'd Do Anything"
- Released: 21 June 1985
- Recorded: 1984
- Genre: Disco
- Length: 3:49
- Label: Epic
- Songwriters: Pete Burns; Mike Percy; Tim Lever; Steve Coy
- Producer: Stock Aitken Waterman

Dead or Alive singles chronology
"Lover Come Back to Me" (1985)	"In Too Deep" (1985)	"My Heart Goes Bang (Get Me to the Doctor)" (1985)

Music video
- "In Too Deep" on YouTube

"In Too Deep" is a song by the English pop band Dead or Alive. It was included on their second studio album Youthquake (1985), and was remixed for release as the third single. The choice of song was criticised by producer Pete Waterman, who felt it strayed too far from the formula of the band's mega-hit, "You Spin Me Round (Like a Record)". It peaked at No. 14 in the UK singles chart, No. 61 in Germany and No. 31 in Australia. Chris Heath of Smash Hits praised the song, saying "it's quite good".

== Track listings ==
UK 7"
No.	Title	Length
1.	"In Too Deep (7" Remix)"	3:50
2.	"I'd Do Anything"	4:12

UK 12"
No.	Title	Length
1.	"In Too Deep ('Off Yer Mong' Mix)"	6:21
2.	"I'd Do Anything (12" Version)"	5:23
3.	"You Make Me Wanna"	2:50

== Charts ==
Weekly chart performance for "In Too Deep"
Chart (1985)	Peak position
Australia (Kent Music Report)	31
Finland (Suomen virallinen lista)	30
Ireland (IRMA)	12
Luxembourg (Radio Luxembourg)	12
UK (OCC)	14
West Germany (GfK Entertainment charts)	61
