= Hit and Run Lover =

2000 single by Dead or Alive

"Hit & Run Lover"

Single by Dead or Alive

from the album Fragile
- Released: 2000
- Genre: Dance; Disco
- Length: 4:42
- Label: Avex Trax
- Songwriter: Dead or Alive
- Producers: Simon Barnecott; Steve Coy

Dead or Alive singles chronology
"Sex Drive" (1997)	"Hit & Run Lover" (2000)	"You Spin Me Round (2003 Version)" (2003)

Music video
- "Hit And Run Lover" on YouTube

"Hit and Run Lover" is the first song on Fragile, their seventh studio album from the band Dead or Alive. Like their 1990 album Fan the Flame (Part 1), it was released only in Japan, where the band were very popular. The song peaked at No. 2 on the Japanese charts. A remix of the song was included on Unbreakable: The Fragile Remixes (2001).

== Chart performance ==
Chart (2000)	Peak position
Japanese Singles Chart	2
