= What I Want (Dead or Alive song) =

Single by Dead or Alive

from the album Sophisticated Boom Boom
- Released: September 1983
- Recorded: 1983
- Genre: Hi-NRG; dark wave; synth-pop
- Length: 3:42
- Label: Epic
- Songwriters: Pete Burns; Wayne Hussey; Mike Percy; Steve Coy; J. Levin
- Producers: Zeus B. Held; Dead or Alive

Dead or Alive singles chronology
"Misty Circles" (1983)	"What I Want" (1983)	"I'd Do Anything" (1984)
"That's the Way (I Like It)" (1984)	""What I Want" (re-issue)" (1984)	"You Spin Me Round (Like a Record)" (1984)

"What I Want" is a song written and recorded by the English pop band Dead or Alive. It was co-produced by the band and Zeus B. Held and released in August 1983 as the second single from Dead or Alive's debut studio album Sophisticated Boom Boom (1984). The song was not a success when released, peaking at No. 88 in the UK singles chart. After Dead or Alive's UK Top 40 success of "That's the Way (I Like It)", "What I Want" was re-issued in June 1984. It placed only one position higher at No. 87.

== Track listing ==
UK 7"
No.	Title	Length
1.	"What I Want"	3:42
2.	"The Stranger" (re-recorded version)	4:52

UK 12"
No.	Title	Length
1.	"What I Want (Dance Mix)"	6:12
2.	"The Stranger" (re-recorded version)	4:52

== Chart performance ==
Chart (1983)	Peak position
UK singles chart	88
Chart (1984)	Peak position
UK singles chart	87
