= Rip It Up (Dead or Alive album) =

Greatest hits album by Dead or Alive
- Released: 6 July 1987
- Genre: Pop rock; dance-pop; Hi-NRG
- Label: Epic
- Producer: Stock Aitken Waterman

Dead or Alive chronology
Mad, Bad and Dangerous to Know (1986)	Rip It Up (1987)	Nude (1988)

Professional ratings
Review scores
Source	Rating
AllMusic	4/5 stars

Rip It Up is a greatest hits album released by the English pop band Dead or Alive in 1987 on Epic Records. It contains eight singles from their two prior albums, Youthquake (1985) and Mad, Bad, and Dangerous to Know (1986), segued together much like a DJ-mix. A new Japanese version entitled Rip It Up +1 was released in 2004.

== Track listing ==
No.	Title	Length
1.	"Brand New Lover"	4:34
2.	"My Heart Goes Bang"	5:24
3.	"Something in My House"	4:25
4.	"Lover Come Back to Me"	3:53
5.	"You Spin Me Round (Like a Record)"	4:27
6.	"I'll Save You All My Kisses"	4:45
7.	"In Too Deep"	3:56
8.	"Hooked on Love"	4:11

Rip It Up +1 bonus track
No.	Title	Length
9.	"Turn Around & Count 2 Ten" (The Pearl & Dean "I Love" – BPM mix)	8:36
