= Dead or Alive (band) =

British band (1980–2016)

- Dead or Alive, 1984. From left to right: Mike Percy, Steve Coy, Pete Burns, and Tim Lever

Background information
- Origin: Liverpool, England
- Genres: Pop rock; Eurodisco; Hi-NRG; dance-pop; new wave; synth-pop
- Works: Discography
- Years active: 1980–2016
- Labels: Epic; Sony Japan; Cleopatra; Avex Trax
- Past members: Pete Burns; Martin Healy; Mike Percy; Wayne Hussey; Steve Coy; Timothy Lever; Peter Oxendale; Jason Alburey; Dean Bright

Dead or Alive were an English rock band formed in 1979 in Liverpool by Pete Burns (vocals). After several unsuccessful indie singles, they signed to Epic Records in 1983, achieving their first chart placement with "Misty Circles" from their first album Sophisticated Boom Boom (1984). At that time, the band consisted of Burns, Steve Coy (drums), Tim Lever (keyboards), Mike Percy (bass), and Wayne Hussey (guitar). Burns and Coy remained the core of the band for the rest of its history, with Hussey leaving in 1984 (going onto Sisters of Mercy and later the Mission), while Lever and Percy both left in 1988.

The band achieved seven UK and two US Top 40 singles, their biggest hit being "You Spin Me Round (Like a Record)" from their second album Youthquake (1985), which reached No. 1 on the UK singles chart and No. 11 on the US Billboard Hot 100, while also topping the Billboard Hot Dance Club Play chart in the US. Their other UK or US Top 40 hits were "That's the Way (I Like It)" from Sophisticated Boom Boom, "Lover Come Back to Me", "In Too Deep" and "My Heart Goes Bang (Get Me to the Doctor)" from Youthquake, and "Brand New Lover" and "Something in My House" from third album Mad, Bad and Dangerous to Know (1986). They also topped the US Hot Dance Club Play chart a second time with "Come Home With Me Baby" from their fourth album Nude (1988). All of their first three albums went Top 40 on the UK albums chart, while Youthquake was their only Top 40 album in the US, reaching No. 31 on the Billboard 200.

Pete Burns died on October 23, 2016, bringing Dead or Alive to a definitive end. Steve Coy died on May 4, 2018. In 2021, Fan the Flame (Part 2): The Resurrection, a "lost" album recorded in the 1990s, was completed and issued for the very first time.

"You Spin Me Round (Like a Record)" charted again in 2006 following Burns's appearance on the television reality show Celebrity Big Brother, and again in 2022 after its inclusion on season 4 of Stranger Things. In December 2016, Billboard ranked Dead or Alive as the 96th most successful dance artist of all time.

== History ==
=== 1977–1982: Formation, Nightmares In Wax and early singles ===
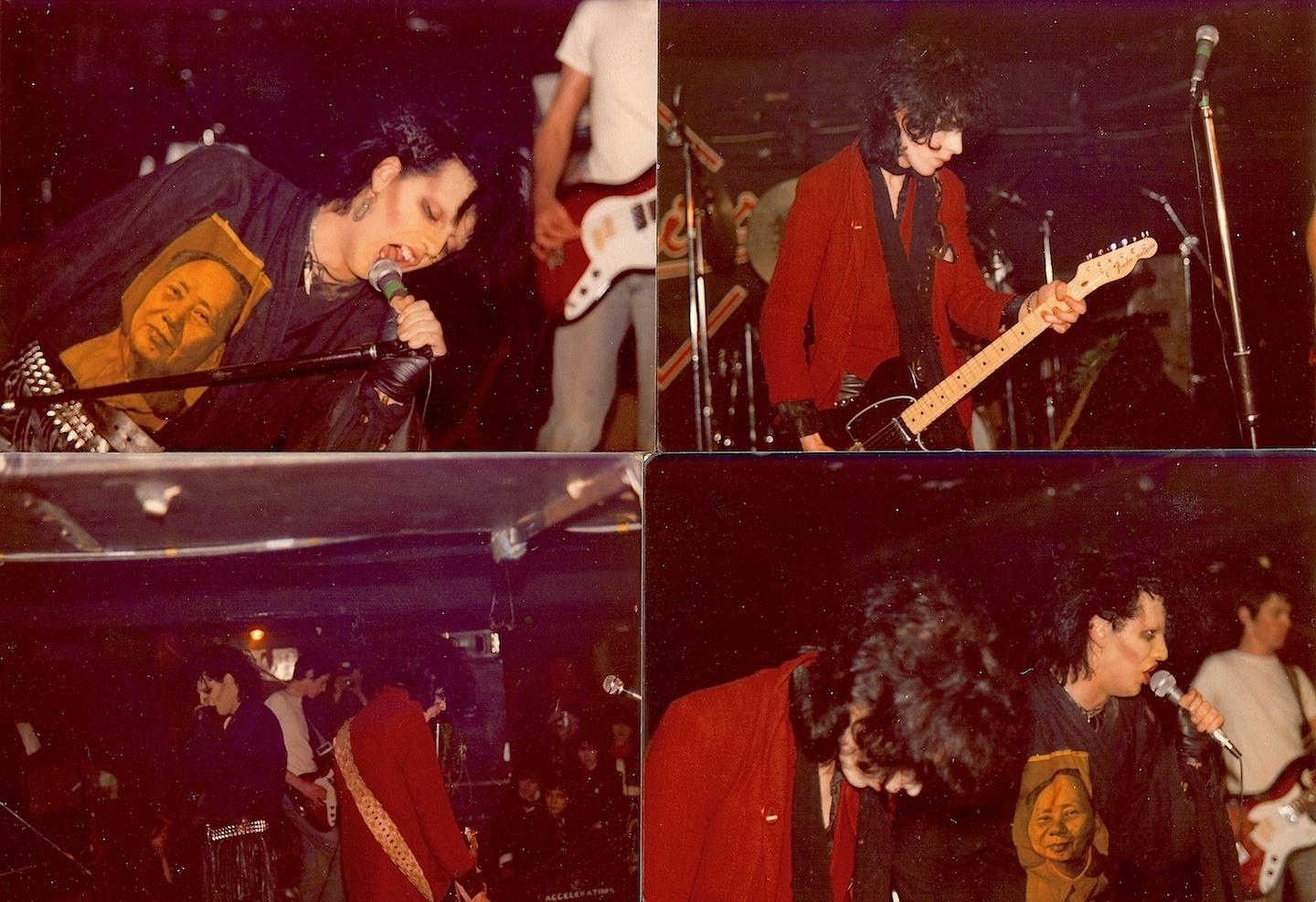
Nightmares in Wax (March 1980)

In 1977, Burns formed a punk band with contemporaries Julian Cope, Pete Wylie, and Phil Hurst, calling themselves the Mystery Girls. They only had one performance (opening for Sham 69 at Eric's Club in Liverpool in November 1977) before disintegrating. Cope stated that Burns's performing style drew from the transgender punk performer Jayne County and Wylie recalled that "his head looked like someone had melted a load of black vinyl down into a kind of space quiff."

Burns and keyboardist Martin Healy formed a new band in 1979, initially Rainbows Over Nagasaki but soon renamed Nightmares In Wax, featuring a gothic post-punk sound, along with guitarist Mick Reid, bassist Rob Jones (later replaced by Walter Ogden), and drummer Paul Hornby (later replaced by Phil Hurst). The group played their first gig supporting Wire at Eric's Club in July 1979, and recorded demos which included a cover of the Simon Dupree and the Big Sound song "Kites", a feature of their early shows.

Their sole release under the name Nightmares In Wax was a 7-inch EP, Birth of a Nation, released in March 1980 on Inevitable Records. The EP featured "Black Leather", which turned halfway into KC and the Sunshine Band's "That's the Way (I Like It)". Two of the tracks from the EP, "Girl Song" and "Shangri-La", were re-released in 1985 as a 12” single, following the band’s later rise to fame.

In 1980, during a line-up change, Burns changed the band's name once more to Dead or Alive. The band went through several line-up changes over the next three years while recording a series of independent singles. Dead or Alive's singles started charting on the UK Indie Chart, beginning with 1982's "The Stranger" reaching No. 7. This prompted major label Epic Records to sign the band in 1983.

=== 1983–1984: Epic Records and Sophisticated Boom Boom ===
Dead or Alive's first release for Epic was the single "Misty Circles", which appeared at No. 100 on the major UK Singles Chart in 1983. Two more singles co-produced by Zeus B. Held ("What I Want" and "I'd Do Anything") were released. The band's debut album, Sophisticated Boom Boom, was released in May 1984 and featured their first Top 40 UK single, "That's the Way (I Like It)", a cover of the 1975 hit by KC and the Sunshine Band. That song, along with "Misty Circles", were also hits on the US Hot Dance Music/Club Play chart. The album was a minor success in the UK where it peaked at No. 29.

As Burns and his band achieved greater media exposure, his eccentric and androgynous appearance often led to comparisons with Culture Club and its lead singer Boy George as well as "Calling Your Name" singer Marilyn. Burns would describe producing his first album as "the most joyous experience of my life, full of happy memories, because there was no commercial pressure on us."

=== 1985–1987: Mainstream peak ===
Released in late 1984, the band's single "You Spin Me Round (Like a Record)" eventually reached No. 1 on the UK Singles Chart, after lingering outside the Top 40 for over two months. The track also hit No. 11 in the US and No. 1 in Canada. The single was produced by the then-fledgling production team of Mike Stock, Matt Aitken, and Pete Waterman, known as Stock Aitken Waterman (SAW).

Burns said that the record company was initially unenthusiastic about the single to such an extent that he had to take out a £2,500 loan to record it. Afterward, he recalled, "the record company said it was awful" and the band also had to fund production of the song's video themselves. Additionally, Burns said that 12-inch singles comprised over 70% of the original sales of "You Spin Me Round", and because these were regarded by the record label as promotional tools rather than sales, the band had to threaten legal action against the label before they received the royalties on them.

This was followed by the release of the band's second album, Youthquake, (US No. 31, UK No. 9) in May 1985. Other album tracks released as singles included "Lover Come Back To Me" (No. 11), "In Too Deep" (No. 14), and "My Heart Goes Bang (Get Me to the Doctor)" (No. 23) which all reached the UK Top 30. Despite the international chart-topping success of Youthquake and its lead single, Burns said it was the album that he was "most dissatisfied with" and recalled that "one of the unhappiest days of my life was when Spin Me reached No. 1 – and I mean really unhappy. Because I knew it would be downhill all the way after that." Burns had a fear of success and hoped that his singles would not chart highly. "I didn't want too high positions because I didn't want to lose my life," he recalled. "I thought, if it happens it happens, but if it doesn't – phew!"

In late 1986, Dead or Alive released their third album, Mad, Bad and Dangerous to Know (US No. 52, UK No. 27). Production of the album was marred by more fights between the band and SAW.

The lead single "Brand New Lover" became a modest UK hit, peaking at No. 31, but was more successful in the US where it reached No. 15 on the US Hot 100, and No. 1 on the US Billboard dance chart.

Three more singles from the album were released; the most successful in the UK was "Something in My House" (No. 12). Despite the reservations of the label and producers, the track proved to be Dead or Alive's biggest hit in the UK since "Lover Come Back to Me" and was the only single from their third album to earn a UK Top 20 placement. The song also proved to be the act's final Top 40 hit with an original release in the UK, and their last Top 20 hit in Australia.

In 1987, Dead or Alive released their greatest hits album Rip It Up, and a concert tour of the same name with dates in Europe, the United States, and Japan. Film footage was recorded at two shows at Tokyo's Nippon Budokan on 9 October and at Osaka's Osaka-jō Hall on 11 October, and released on video cassette (VHS) and Laserdisc that same year under the title Rip It Up Live. The concert was eventually issued as bonus material for the first time on DVD as part of the 2003 compilation release.

External videos
- Dead or Alive - Rip It Up 1987
- Dead or Alive - Disco In Dream 1989
- Dead or Alive - Full Evolution 2003

=== 1988–1992: Nude, Fan The Flame, and Percy and Lever's departure ===
At the end of 1988, Dead or Alive released the self-produced Nude (US No. 106, UK No. 82). During the album's production, Tim Lever and Mike Percy were fired from the band, leaving only Burns and Coy. The pair later formed careers as mixers and producers; both owned and operated Steelworks Studios in Sheffield and experienced success writing and mixing songs for acts like S Club 7, Blue, and Robbie Williams. From the information booklet in Sophisticated Boom Box MMXVI, Burns stated:

During the first couple of months of writing and recording, Mike and Tim seemed to be acting a little distant and insular, and after a bit of investigation, we discovered that they were building their own professional recording studio where they lived. When we asked why, they said they wanted to move into concentrating on record production work on their own, didn't want to be in a band and touring and away from their families all of the time and say they were leaving the band at the end of the Nude album recording! Well, excuse me boys, but I don't tolerate disloyalty and people making plans behind my back. I discussed it with Steve, and he and I decided that we didn't want them working half-heartedly on an album that we knew had to be the very best we could make, so we fired them on the spot, and told them to go concentrate on giving 100% to their new career as producers. It was a tough decision to make, but they made the decision for us.

The album featured the single "Turn Around and Count 2 Ten" which reached No. 2 in the US Hot Dance Club Songs chart and No. 1 for a record-breaking seventeen-weeks in Japan. It was followed by the singles "Baby Don't Say Goodbye" which peaked at No. 6 on the Billboard Dance Club Songs chart and "Come Home with Me Baby" which spent thirteen-weeks at No. 1 on the US Hot Dance Music/Club Play due to a popular remix by producer Lewis Martineé. However, "Come Home with Me Baby" and the other singles struggled in the UK. This was attributed to the lyrical theme of casual sex being at odds with the AIDs epidemic of the time.

Additionally, despite strong customer demand, the US record company refused to release it as a proper single (claiming they objected to the male dancers in the music video) which prevented the song from becoming a major hit on the Billboard Hot 100. In 1989, to support his Nude album and the release of its companion remix album Nude – Remade Remodelled, Burns toured with fellow Stock Aitken Waterman acts Sinitta and Kylie Minogue in Asia and Europe on the ensemble Disco in Dream concert tour. On 6 October, Burns gave a performance at the Tokyo Dome, the largest concert venue in Japan (with a seating capacity of 55,000 people), which was broadcast on the NHK television network.

In 1990, the band produced their next studio album, Fan the Flame (Part 1), featuring a more introspective tone. The only successful publishing deal was in Japan where the album peaked at No. 27 on the Japanese Albums Chart. The band had begun to produce Fan the Flame (Part 2), however the album was shelved until it was finished in 2021. An acoustic album Love, Pete was also made available during a US personal appearance tour in 1992 and was since widely bootlegged.

=== 1994–2003: International Chrysis, Nukleopatra and Fragile ===
The band returned in 1994 under a new name, International Chrysis, releasing a contemporary electronic cover of David Bowie's "Rebel Rebel". This was followed by a new studio album, Nukleopatra, for which the band reverted to their previous name.

In 2000, Dead or Alive released Fragile, a collection of remakes with several new tracks and covers including U2's "Even Better Than the Real Thing" and Nick Kamen's "I Promised Myself". The first song on the album, "Hit and Run Lover", was a hit single peaking at No. 2 on the Japanese charts. A new remix album, Unbreakable: The Fragile Remixes, was released in 2001.

This was followed in 2003 with a greatest hits album entitled Evolution: the Hits along with a video compilation that was also released on DVD. "You Spin Me Round (Like a Record)" was re-released as a single to promote the album with it reaching No. 23 on the UK Singles Chart.

=== 2010s ===
On 7 September 2010, Burns's solo single "Never Marry an Icon", produced and co-written by the Dirty Disco, was released to the iTunes Store. The single was released by fellow band member Steve Coy's label, Bristar Records. Even though Burns stated Dead or Alive had ceased to exist in 2011, Coy later declared the moniker was still active and the band was not over. On 21 December 2012, Burns and Coy performed at the Pete Waterman concert Hit Factory Live at London's O2 Arena.

Burns died of a cardiac arrest on 23 October 2016, at the age of 57, ending the band.

On 28 October 2016, a 19-disc box set titled Sophisticated Boom Box MMXVI was released by Edsel Records. The release was announced on September 8, via Demon Music Group as a "personally curated [by Burns and Coy] 19 disc set, featuring the original album tracks plus a plethora of rarities, live recordings, alternate mixes, instrumental versions and more than 12 previously unreleased remixes and tracks from their vaults, bringing a unique collection together from the band’s internationally successful career for the very first time."

Coy died on 4 May 2018 at the age of 56. Coy was in Italy to work on a new studio album before he died at his Bogliasco home following an eleven-month battle with cancer.

== Personnel ==
Members

- Pete Burns – vocals, tambourine (Note: In some of the band's music videos, Burns is pretending to play guitar, but he actually never played any instrument.) (1979–2016; his death)
- Martin Healy – keyboards (1980–1983)
- Joe Musker – drums (1980–1982)
- Sue James – bass (1980–1981)
- Adrian Mitchley – guitars (1980–1981)
- Mike Percy – bass, guitars, keyboards (1981–1988)
- Wayne Hussey – guitars (1981–1984)
- Steve Coy – drums, percussion, keyboards, guitars, bass (1982–2016; died 2018)
- Timothy Lever – keyboards, saxophone, guitars, sequencers (1983–1988)
- Peter Oxendale – keyboards (1989–1995)
- Jason Alburey – keyboards, guitars (1995–2003)
- Dean Bright – keyboards, keytar (1995–2003)

Nightmares in Wax members

- Mick Reid – guitars (1979–1980)
- Walter Ogden – bass (1979)
- Rob Jones – bass (1979)
- Paul Hornby – drums (1979; died 2015)
- Phil Hurst – drums (1979–1980)
- Pete Lloyd – bass (1980; died 2024)

Touring members

- Sonia Mazumder – dancer, backing vocals (1982–1984)
- James Hyde – dancer (1987–1990)
- Adam Perry – dancer (1987)
- Simon Gogerly – keytar, keyboards (1989)
- B.J. Smouth – keyboards (1989)
- Gary Hughes – dancer (1989)
- Matt Selby – dancer (1989)
- Tony Griffiths – dancer (1989)
- Steve Agyei – dancer (1989)
- Zeb Jamenson – keyboards (1990)
- Tracy Ackerman – backing vocals (1990)
- Tony Griffith – dancer (1990)
- Philip Hurst – dancer (1990)
- Mark Scott – dancer (1990)
- Cliff Slapher – keyboards (2001)
- Micki Dee – keyboards (2001)

== Discography ==
- Sophisticated Boom Boom (1984)
- Youthquake (1985)
- Mad, Bad and Dangerous to Know (1986)
- Nude (1988)
- Fan the Flame (Part 1) (1990)
- Nukleopatra (1995)
- Fragile (2000)
- Fan the Flame (Part 2): The Resurrection (2021)

== See also ==
- List of Billboard number-one dance club songs
- List of artists who reached number one on the U.S. Dance Club Songs chart
