= Misty Circles =

Single by Dead or Alive

from the album Sophisticated Boom Boom
- B-side: "Misty Circles (Instrumental)"
- Released: April 1983
- Recorded: 1983
- Genre: New wave; post-punk; synth-pop; alternative rock
- Length: 3:39
- Label: Epic
- Songwriters: Pete Burns; Wayne Hussey; Mike Percy
- Producers: Zeus B. Held; Dead or Alive

Dead or Alive singles chronology
| "The Stranger" (1982) | "Misty Circles" (1983) | "What I Want" (1983) |

"Misty Circles" is a song written and recorded by the English pop band Dead or Alive. It was co-produced by the band and Zeus B. Held and released as the first single from Dead or Alive's debut studio album Sophisticated Boom Boom (1984). "Misty Circles" was the first song to be released by Dead or Alive after being signed to a major label, Epic Records. The band's prior single releases were issued independently. This song was not very successful, but it managed to peak at No. 100 on the UK singles chart.

In 1984, the song was placed on the B-side of "You Spin Me Round (Like a Record)". As both sides earned significant play in American nightclubs, they charted together as a double-sided hit on the U.S. Hot Dance Club Play chart, peaking at No. 4. The band performed it before a live audience on Razzmatazz.

== Track listing ==
UK 7"
| No. | Title | Length |
|---|---|---|
| 1. | "Misty Circles" | 3:45 |
| 2. | "Misty Circles (Instrumental)" | 3:44 |

UK 12"
| No. | Title | Length |
|---|---|---|
| 1. | "Misty Circles (Dance Mix)" | 9:14 |
| 2. | "Misty Circles (Dub Mix)" | 6:14 |
| 3. | "Selfish Side" | 2:35 |

== Chart performance ==
| Chart (1983) | Peak position |
|---|---|
| UK Singles Chart | 100 |
| US Billboard Hot Dance Club Play | 4 |
