= That's the Way (I Like It) =

1975 single by KC and the Sunshine Band

- West German CD maxi single (1989 remix)

Single by KC and the Sunshine Band

from the album KC and the Sunshine Band
- B-side: "What Makes You Happy"
- Released: June 10, 1975
- Genre: Disco; funk
- Length: 3:06 (radio edit); 5:07 (album version)
- Label: TK
- Songwriters: Harry Wayne Casey; Richard Finch
- Producers: Harry Wayne Casey; Richard Finch

KC and the Sunshine Band singles chronology
"Shotgun Shuffle" (1975)	"That's the Way (I Like It)" (1975)	"I'm So Crazy ('Bout You)" (1975)

Official audio
- "That's the Way (I Like It)" on YouTube

"That's the Way (I Like It)" is a song by American disco and funk band KC and the Sunshine Band from their self-titled second studio album (1975). The single became the band's second No. 1 hit in the Billboard Hot 100, and it is one of the few chart-toppers in history to hit No. 1 on more than one occasion during a one-month period, as it did between November and December 1975. It topped the US pop chart for one week, and then was replaced by another disco song, "Fly, Robin, Fly" by Silver Convention. "That's the Way (I Like It)" returned to No. 1 for one more week after "Fly, Robin, Fly" completed three weeks at the top. "That's the Way (I Like It)" also spent one week at No. 1 in the soul singles chart. The song is in natural minor.

The song was also an international chart hit, reaching No. 1 in Canada and the Netherlands and charting in Australia (No. 5), Belgium (No. 2), Ireland (No. 17), New Zealand (No. 12), Norway (No. 5), the United Kingdom (No. 4) and West Germany (No. 20).

Record World said that "A spirited, uplifting sound is based around a theme which should be reverberating across the country in no time!".

For release as a single and radio airplay, the song was toned down from the original recording, which would have jeopardized it receiving getting radio airplay at the time. However the sexual overtones may have improved the record's reception at discos, increasing its overall popularity in the charts.

== Charts ==
=== Weekly charts ===
Chart (1975–1976)	Peak position
Australia (Kent Music Report)	5
Belgium (Ultratop 50 Flanders)	2
Canada Top Singles (RPM)	1
Ireland (IRMA)	17
Netherlands (Dutch Top 40)	1
Netherlands (Single Top 100)	1
New Zealand (Recorded Music NZ)	12
Norway (VG-lista)	5
South Africa (Springbok Radio)	6
Sweden (Sverigetopplistan)	3
UK Singles (Official Charts)	4
US Billboard Hot 100	1
US Hot Dance Club Play (Billboard)	18
US Hot R&B Singles (Billboard)	1
US Cash Box Top 100	1
West Germany (Media Control)	20

Chart (1991)	Peak position
UK Singles (OCC)	59
UK Dance (Music Week)	47

=== Year-end charts ===
Chart (1975)	Rank
Canada (RPM)	14
Netherlands (Single Top 100)	9
UK Singles (OCC)	49
US Cash Box Top 100	49

Chart (1976)	Rank
Australia (Kent Music Report)	51
US Billboard Hot 100	45

== Certifications ==
Region	Certification	Certified units/sales
Australia (ARIA) 2004 digital remaster	Gold	35,000^{‡}
Canada (Music Canada)	Platinum	150,000^{^}
New Zealand (RMNZ)	Gold	15,000^{‡}
United Kingdom (BPI)	Silver	200,000^{‡}
United States (RIAA)	Platinum	1,000,000^{‡}
^{^} Shipments figures based on certification alone.^{‡} Sales+streaming figures based on certification alone.

== Dead or Alive version ==
"That's the Way (I Like It)"

Single by Dead or Alive

from the album Sophisticated Boom Boom
- B-side: "Keep That Body Strong (That's The Way)"
- Released: March 1984
- Recorded: 1983
- Length: 3:38
- Label: Epic
- Songwriters: Harry W. Casey; Richard Finch
- Producers: Dead or Alive; Zeus B. Held

Dead or Alive singles chronology
"I'd Do Anything" (1984)	"That's the Way (I Like It)" (1984)	"You Spin Me Round (Like a Record)" (1984)

Music video
- "That's the Way (I Like It)" on YouTube

In 1979, singer Pete Burns used the chorus in the song "Black Leather", composed and recorded in the early stages of Dead or Alive (then Nightmares in Wax). In 1984, the group covered the song for their debut studio album, Sophisticated Boom Boom (1984), creating their first UK top 40 single.

=== Track listings ===
- 7" single
1. "That's the Way (I Like It)" – 3:38
2. "Do It" – 3:53
- 7" picture single
1. "That's the Way (I Like It)" – 3:37
2. "Keep That Body Strong (That's the Way)" – 3:37
- 12" maxi
1. "That's the Way (I Like It)" (extended version) – 5:52
2. "Keep That Body Strong (That's the Way)" – 3:37

=== Chart ===
Chart (1984)	Peak position
Australia (Kent Music Report)	45
Ireland (IRMA)	23
Luxembourg (Radio Luxembourg)	16
UK Singles (OCC)	22
US Hot Dance Club Play (Billboard)	28

== Spin Doctors and Biz Markie version ==
"That's the Way (I Like It)"

Song by Spin Doctors and Biz Markie

from the album You've Got to Believe in Something Space Jam: Music from and Inspired by the Motion Picture
- Released: May 14, 1996 (You've Got to Believe in Something); November 12, 1996 (Space Jam)
- Genre: R&B; Hip hop
- Length: 5:27 (Spin Doctors); 3:46 (Space Jam)
- Label: Epic (Spin Doctors version); Warner Sunset; Atlantic
- Songwriters: Harry Wayne Casey; Richard Finch

In 1996, alternative rock band Spin Doctors and rapper Biz Markie covered the 1975 song, initially recorded to be the second single to the 1996 Spin Doctors album You've Got to Believe in Something. However, the song would ultimately become an unlisted bonus track on the album.

Later that year, the song would be released for the film Space Jam and its soundtrack, both of which released in 1996. Chris Barron sung main verses and chorus while Markie sung rap verses.

== Clock version ==
"That's the Way (I Like It)"

Single by Clock

from the album Boogie Sound
- Released: 1997
- Genre: Eurodance
- Length: 3:45
- Label: Power Station Recordings; MCA Records
- Songwriters: Harry Wayne Casey; Richard Finch

Clock singles chronology
"U Sexy Thing" (1997)	"That's the Way (I Like It)" (1997)	"Rock Your Body" (1998)

Music video
- "That's the Way (I Like It)" on YouTube

In 1997, British pop/dance act Clock released a cover of the song, which appears on their Japan-only album release Boogie Sound. It was a moderate hit in early 1998, peaking at No. 17 in Ireland, No. 11 in the United Kingdom and No. 66 in France.

=== Critical reception ===
A reviewer from Music Week rated Clock's version two out of five, adding, "But with Clock's established grip on the Top 20, no doubt it will sell." The magazine's Alan Jones wrote, "Clock get short shrift from critics, though record buyers can't get enough of them. They will certainly tick up another hit with 'That's the Way (I Like It)', an obvious cover of the old KC & the Sunshine Band track currently doing service as a TV commercial soundtrack. It stays close to the original, and will provide one of the first big hits of 1998."

=== Track listing ===
- CD single, CD 1, UK (1998)
1. "That's the Way (I Like It)" (radio mix) – 3:45
2. "That's the Way (I Like It)" (Ultra Disco radio mix) – 3:19
3. "That's the Way (I Like It)" (short stab) – 4:01
4. "That's the Way (I Like It)" (video) – 3:12

=== Charts ===
Chart (1998)	Peak position
Australia (ARIA)	137
Ireland (IRMA)	17
France (SNEP)	66
Scottish Singles Sales (Official Charts)	16
UK Singles (OCC)	11

== In popular culture ==
"That's the Way (I Like It)" was used in a 1996 Burger King television ad for Canada and the United States.

It is also featured in the old 2010 Android ads for 'Smart + T'

"That's the Way (I Like It)" was referenced by English comedian Joe Lycett in his 2016 live stand-up special That's the Way, A-Ha A-Ha, Joe Lycett.

== Bibliography ==
- Craig MacInnis (2002). That's the Way I Like It (The Harry Wayne Casey Story). Team Power Publishing. ISBN 2895680590.
