= Sophisticated Boom Boom =

- Cover photography by Peter Ashworth

Studio album by Dead or Alive
- Released: 20 April 1984
- Recorded: 1983–1984
- Genres: Dance-pop; hi-NRG
- Length: 41:00
- Label: Epic
- Producers: Zeus B. Held; Dead or Alive

Dead or Alive chronology
Sophisticated Boom Boom (1984)	Youthquake (1985)

Singles from Sophisticated Boom Boom
- 1. "Misty Circles" Released: April 1983; 2. "What I Want" Released: September 1983; 3. "I'd Do Anything" Released: January 1984; 4. "That's the Way (I Like It)" Released: March 1984

Professional ratings
Review scores
Source	Rating
AllMusic	1/5 stars
The Rolling Stone Album Guide	1/5 stars
Smash Hits	8/10 stars

Sophisticated Boom Boom is the debut studio album by the English pop band Dead or Alive, released on 20 April 1984 by Epic Records. Featuring mostly synth-pop and dance elements, the album contains the band's first UK top 40 single, a cover version of KC and the Sunshine Band's "That's the Way (I Like It)". That song, along with "Misty Circles", were hits on the US Hot Dance Music/Club Play chart. The album was a minor success in the UK where it peaked at No. 29.

The original cassette version of the album was released with three bonus tracks. In 2007, the album was re-released on CD by Cherry Red Records with seven bonus tracks. The cover photograph was taken by Peter Ashworth and was inspired by the cover of Kate Bush's second studio album Lionheart (1978). The original title for the album was Mad, Bad and Dangerous to Know, but it was rejected by the label. It would later become the title of the band's third studio album. The title matches that of the song made famous by the Shangri-Las, "Sophisticated Boom Boom", first released on their second album, Shangri-Las-65! (1965).

== Track listing ==
UK 1984 vinyl
No.	Title	Writer(s)	Length
1.	"I'd Do Anything"		4:16
2.	"That's the Way (I Like It)"	Harry Wayne Casey; Richard Finch	3:39
3.	"Absolutely Nothing"		4:21
4.	"What I Want"		5:23
5.	"Far Too Hard"		4:31
6.	"You Make Me Wanna"		2:54
7.	"Sit on It"		3:07
8.	"Wish You Were Here"		5:21
9.	"Misty Circles"		3:39
10.	"Do It"		3:53

1984 cassette bonus tracks
No.	Title	Length
11.	"Keep That Body Strong (That's the Way)"	3:41
12.	"Misty Circles" (instrumental)	3:40

US 1984 vinyl
No.	Title	Writer(s)	Length
1.	"What I Want"		5:23
2.	"Misty Circles"		3:39
3.	"Do It"		3:53
4.	"I'd Do Anything"		4:16
5.	"That's the Way (I Like It)"	Casey; Finch	3:39
6.	"You Make Me Wanna"		2:54
7.	"Sit on It"		3:07
8.	"Wish You Were Here"		5:21
9.	"Absolutely Nothing"		4:21
10.	"Far Too Hard"		4:31

UK 2007 reissue bonus tracks
No.	Title	Length
11.	"Selfish Side"	2:34
12.	"The Stranger"	4:49
13.	"Misty Circles" (Dance Mix)	9:10
14.	"What I Want" (Dance Mix)	6:12
15.	"I'd Do Anything" (Megamix)	5:22
16.	"That's the Way (I Like It)" (Extended Mix)	5:52
17.	"Keep That Body Strong (That's the Way)"	3:38

== Personnel ==
Dead or Alive

- Pete Burns – vocals
- Mike Percy – bass guitar
- Tim Lever – keyboards
- Steve Coy – drums
- Wayne Hussey – guitar (uncredited on album artwork)

Additional musicians

- Jackie Challenor – backing vocals
- Lorenza Johnson – backing vocals
- Mae McKenna – backing vocals
- Kick Horns – horns
- Caroline's Quartet – strings

Production and artwork

- Zeus B. Held – producer; mixer
- Dead or Alive – producer
- Tim Palmer – engineer; mixer
- Chris Sheldon – engineer
- Peter Ashworth – photography

== Chart performance ==
Chart performance for Sophisticated Boom Boom
Chart (1984)	Peak position
UK Singles Chart	29
