= I'd Do Anything (Dead or Alive song) =

Single by Dead or Alive

from the album Sophisticated Boom Boom
- Released: 20 January 1984
- Recorded: 1983
- Genre: New wave
- Length: 4:16
- Label: Epic
- Songwriter(s): Pete Burns; Mike Percy
- Producer(s): Zeus B. Held; Dead or Alive

Dead or Alive singles chronology
| "What I Want" (1983) | "I'd Do Anything" (1984) | "That's the Way (I Like It)" (1984) |

Music video
- "I'd Do Anything" on YouTube

"I'd Do Anything" is a song by the English band Dead or Alive. It was co-produced by the band and Zeus B. Held and released in January 1984 as the third single from the band's debut studio album Sophisticated Boom Boom. The song was the third consecutive single by Dead or Alive to miss the UK top 75, peaking at No. 79 on the UK Singles Chart. The band would gain moderate success with the release of their next single, a cover version of KC and the Sunshine Band's "That's the Way (I Like It)" which peaked at No. 22.

== Track listing ==
UK 7"
| No. | Title | Length |
|---|---|---|
| 1. | "I'd Do Anything" | 4:00 |
| 2. | "Anything (Dub)" | 4:26 |

UK 12"
| No. | Title | Length |
|---|---|---|
| 1. | "I'd Do Anything (Megamix)" | 5:22 |
| 2. | "Anything (Dub)" | 4:26 |
| 3. | "Give It to Me" | 3:20 |

UK 10"
| No. | Title | Length |
|---|---|---|
| 1. | "I'd Do Anything (Megamix)" | 5:22 |
| 2. | "Anything (Dub)" | 4:26 |
| 3. | "Misty Circles" | 3:48 |
| 4. | "What I Want" | 3:42 |

== Chart performance ==
| Chart (1984) | Peak position |
|---|---|
| UK Singles Chart | 79 |
