= You Spin Me Round (Like a Record) =

1984 single by Dead or Alive

Single by Dead or Alive

from the album Youthquake
- B-side: "Misty Circles"
- Released: 5 November 1984
- Recorded: 1984
- Genre: Disco; synth-pop; hi-NRG; dance-pop; new wave
- Length: 3:19 (album version); 3:16 (single version); 8:01 (Murder mix); 7:28 (Performance mix)
- Label: Epic
- Songwriters: Pete Burns; Steve Coy; Wayne Hussey; Tim Lever; Mike Percy
- Producer: Stock Aitken Waterman

Dead or Alive singles chronology
"That's the Way (I Like It)" (1984)	"You Spin Me Round (Like a Record)" (1984)	"Lover Come Back to Me" (1985)

Music video
- "You Spin Me Round (Like a Record)" on YouTube

Audio sample
- file; help

"You Spin Me Round (Like a Record)" is a song by the English pop band Dead or Alive. It was released on 5 November 1984, as the lead single from their second studio album, Youthquake (1985). The song reached No. 1 on the UK Singles Chart in March 1985, taking 17 weeks to get there. It was the first UK No. 1 hit by the Stock Aitken Waterman production trio. On the US Billboard Hot 100, it peaked at No. 11 on 17 August of that year, becoming their highest-charting single there. The song also reached No. 1 in Ireland and in Canada, while in Australia it peaked at No. 3 and it charted highly in numerous European countries. Its music video was directed by Vaughan Arnell and Anthea Benton. In 2003, Q ranked the song at number 981 in their list of the "1001 Best Songs Ever", in 2005 Blender listed it at number 289 on its ranking of "Greatest Songs Since You Were Born", and in 2015 it was voted by the British public as the nation's 17th-favourite 1980s number one in a poll for ITV.

== Background and composition ==
Dead or Alive's lead vocalist Pete Burns stated in his autobiography Freak Unique that he composed "You Spin Me Round" by using two existing songs as inspiration for creating something new:

How did I write "Spin Me"? I listened to Luther Vandross's "I Wanted Your Love". It's not the same chord structure, but then that's the way I make music – I hear something and I sing another tune over it. I didn't sit and study the Luther Vandross album – I heard the song and it locked. [...] I'm trying to structure the music and I know what I want. [...] It's like do this, do this, do this – and suddenly it hits. I don't want to do Luther Vandross's song, but I can still sing the same pattern over it. And there was another record, by Little Nell, called "See You 'Round Like a Record". [...] So I had those two, Van Dross [sic] and Little Nell and – bingo! – done deal.

— Pete Burns, Freak Unique (2007)

Desiring to move on from the sound of the band's debut studio album, Sophisticated Boom Boom (1984), Pete Burns wanted "You Spin Me Round" to be produced by the then little-known production team Stock Aitken Waterman, in the Hi-NRG style of their 1984 UK hits "You Think You're a Man" by Divine, and "Whatever I Do (Wherever I Go)" by Hazell Dean.

In a 2009 interview discussing the song, Burns disputed the Hi-NRG label, saying "to me it was just disco". He also described the song as "a pop hit, not a hi-NRG hit", and claimed Sylvester as a major influence. Burns later said he had wanted to make a "glittery disco record", while Pete Waterman, asked to define the song's sound, said it was "techno-disco; without a question that's what it was. It was new technology playing Motown; that's all it was. Taking out the musicians and bringing in technology for the first time."

Burns claimed the song was "completed" by the time the producers were then chosen to work on it, stating that "the record companies don't trust a band to go into the studio without a producer". According to Burns, the record company Epic was unenthusiastic about "You Spin Me Round" to such an extent that Burns had to take out a £2,500 loan to record it. After it was recorded, he recalled, "the record company said it was awful" and the band had to fund production of the song's video themselves.

Interviewed for BBC Radio 4's The Reunion: The Hit Factory, in April 2015, Burns said that a confrontational attitude between the producers and band led to "quite a bad vibe" during production and "a time of intense friction". Engineer Phil Harding, who mixed the track, said tensions were running so high between the band members and producers Mike Stock and Matt Aitken during mixing, that it almost escalated to violence. Aitken has confirmed that tensions were high, with the producers clashing with band members over the latter's desire to keep adding new elements to the mix. Stock has disputed the seriousness of studio tensions, alleging that Burns, Harding and Pete Waterman have all "exaggerated" what happened in their recounting of events. "You Spin Me Round (Like a Record)" is written in the key of F♯ minor.

== Re-releases and remixes ==
Remixes of the song were released in 1996 and 1997 (some included on the releases of Nukleopatra). In 2000, new mixes appeared on Fragile and in 2001, on Unbreakable: The Fragile Remixes. A remix version of "You Spin Me Round" was released in 2003 at the same time Dead or Alive's greatest hits album Evolution: The Hits was released. The song reached No. 23 on the UK Singles Chart. The original 1984 recording was re-released on 30 January 2006 because of lead singer Pete Burns' controversial time as a contestant on television series Celebrity Big Brother and reached No. 5.

== Chart performance ==
The song has been re-released three times since its original release in 1984. Each time of its release, it achieved success, but failed to match the success of the original. However, after Burns's appearance on Celebrity Big Brother 4 in 2006, the single was re-released and managed a Top 5 peak on the UK Singles Chart. According to Burns, 12-inch singles comprised over 70% of the original sales of "You Spin Me Round", and because these were regarded by the record label as promotional tools rather than sales, the band had to threaten legal action against the label before they received the royalties on them.

== Music video ==
The accompanying music video for "You Spin Me Round (Like a Record)", which features a disco ball, waving gold flags and an evocation of the six-armed deity Vishnu, was directed by Vaughan Arnell and Anthea Benton.

== Impact and legacy ==
In 2000, VH1 ranked "You Spin Me Round (Like a Record)" number 91 in their list of "100 Greatest Dance Songs". In 2003, British popular music magazine Q ranked it number 981 in their list of the "1001 Best Songs Ever". In 2005, Blender listed it at number 289 on its ranking of "Greatest Songs Since You Were Born". In 2014, Matt Dunn of WhatCulture ranked the song at number three in his "15 unforgettable Stock Aitken Waterman singles" list, stating that the song "has had an enormous presence in pop culture since its 1984 release", as it has been covered, sampled, bootlegged or remixed by many artists, and used in films, series and TV ads.

In 2015, it was voted by the British public as the nation's 17th favourite 1980s number-one in a poll for ITV. After the death of Burns in 2016, musician and actor Gary Kemp described the song as "one of the best white dance records of all time." In 2020, The Guardian ranked the song number five in their list of "The 100 Greatest UK No 1s". In 2021, Classic Pop ranked it number-one in their list of "Top 40 Stock Aitken Waterman songs".

In 2023, the song was covered by Netta as part of the Eurovision Song Contest 2023 tribute to music from Liverpool. In 2023, Alexis Petridis of The Guardian listed the song at number one in his "Stock Aitken Waterman's 20 greatest songs – ranked!", describing it "a breathlessly exciting single... It's commercial pop music that captures a small-hours dancefloor's hedonism and hysteria". In 2025, Thomas Edward of Smooth Radio ranked the song number three in his list of "Stock Aitken Waterman's 15 greatest songs, ranked".

== Track listing ==
1985, Epic – 49-05208; 1989, Epic – 49H69181

1. "You Spin Me Round (Like a Record)" (Murder Mix) – 8:00
2. "Misty Circles" (Extended Version) – 9:10

1997, Epic – 49-78588

1. "You Spin Me Round (Like a Record)" (Murder Mix) – 8:00
2. "Brand New Lover" – 9:10

1999, Cleopatra – CLP 0533-2

- CD1
1. "You Spin Me Round (Like a Record)" (Sugar Pumpers Radio Edit) – 3:38
2. "You Spin Me Round (Like a Record)" (Cleopatra Radio Edit) – 4:13
3. "You Spin Me Round (Like a Record)" (Marc Antonine Radio Edit) – 3:21
4. "You Spin Me Round (Like a Record)" (Sugar Pumpers Extended Mix) – 5:11
5. "You Spin Me Round (Like a Record)" (Sugar Pumpers Pumpin Mix) – 7:05
6. "You Spin Me Round (Like a Record)" (Vicious Mix) – 8:10
7. "You Spin Me Round (Like a Record)" (Marc Antonine Club Mix) – 7:00
- CD2
1. "Sex Drive" (Radio Edit) – 2:52
2. "Sex Drive" (Scream Driven Edit) – 3:54
3. "Sex Drive" (Dead or Alive Original Mix) – 6:39
4. "Sex Drive" (Scream Driven Mix) – 6:59
5. "Sex Drive" (Pee Wee Remix) – 5:56

2003, Epic 673578 2

1. "You Spin Me Round (Like a Record)" (Metro 7" Edit) – 3:46
2. "You Spin Me Round (Like a Record)" (Metro 12" Extended Mix) – 6:55
3. "You Spin Me Round (Like a Record)" (Punx Soundcheck Vs Princess Julia) – 5:47
4. "You Spin Me Round (Like a Record)" (Original 7" Mix) – 3:16

2006, Epic 82876 806212

1. "You Spin Me Round (Like a Record)" (Original 7" Mix) – 3:16
2. "You Spin Me Round (Like a Record)" (Performance Mix) – 7:27
3. "You Spin Me Round (Like a Record)" (Metro 7" Edit) – 3:46
4. Video: "You Spin Me Round (Like a Record)" – 3:44

== Charts ==
=== Weekly charts ===
1985 weekly chart performance for "You Spin Me Round (Like a Record)"
Chart (1985)	Peak position
Australia (Kent Music Report)	3
Austria (Ö3 Austria Top 40)	10
Belgium (Ultratop 50 Flanders)	3
Canada Top Singles (RPM)	1
Europe (European Hot 100 Singles)	5
Finland (Suomen virallinen lista)	9
France (SNEP)	29
Ireland (IRMA)	1
Italy (Musica e dischi)	2
Japan (Oricon)	54
Luxembourg (Radio Luxembourg)	1
Netherlands (Dutch Top 40)	6
Netherlands (Single Top 100)	4
New Zealand (Recorded Music NZ)	6
Norway (VG-lista)	6
Switzerland (Schweizer Hitparade)	1
UK Singles (Official Charts)	1
US Billboard Hot 100	11
US 12-inch Singles Sales (Billboard)	4
US Dance/Disco Club Play (Billboard) with "Misty Circles"	4
US Cash Box Top Singles	13
West Germany (GfK)	2

1996 weekly chart performance for "You Spin Me Round (Like a Record)"
Chart (1996)	Peak position
Australia (ARIA)	28

2003 weekly chart performance for "You Spin Me Round (Like a Record)"
Chart (2003)	Peak position
Australia (ARIA)	62
Germany (Media Control GfK)	96
Hungary (Dance Top 40)	30
Ireland (IRMA)	47
Ireland Dance (IRMA)	9
Scottish Singles Sales (Official Charts)	28
UK Singles (Official Charts)	23
US Dance Club Play (Billboard)	21

2006 weekly chart performance for "You Spin Me Round (Like a Record)"
Chart (2006)	Peak position
Europe (European Hot 100 Singles)	20
Ireland (IRMA)	26
Ireland Dance (IRMA)	8
Scottish Singles Sales (Official Charts)	1
UK Singles (Official Charts)	5

=== Year-end charts ===
1985 year-end chart performance for "You Spin Me Round (Like a Record)"
Chart (1985)	Position
Australia (Kent Music Report)	13
Belgium (Ultratop 50 Flanders)	43
Canada Top Singles (RPM)	16
Netherlands (Dutch Top 40)	57
Netherlands (Single Top 100)	46
New Zealand (RIANZ)	36
Switzerland (Schweizer Hitparade)	14
UK Singles (OCC)	19
West Germany (Media Control)	15

2006 year-end chart performance for "You Spin Me Round (Like a Record)"
Chart (2006)	Position
UK Singles (OCC)	99

== Certifications ==
Certifications for "You Spin Me Round (Like a Record)"
Region	Certification	Certified units/sales
Canada (Music Canada)	Gold	50,000^{^}
Germany (BVMI)	Gold	300,000^{‡}
Italy (FIMI) Sales since 2009	Gold	35,000^{‡}
New Zealand (RMNZ)	Platinum	30,000^{‡}
United Kingdom (BPI) Physical	Gold	500,000^{^}
United Kingdom (BPI) Digital	2× Platinum	1,200,000^{‡}
^{^} Shipments figures based on certification alone.^{‡} Sales+streaming figures based on certification alone.

== Dope version ==
"You Spin Me Round (Like a Record)"

Single by Dope

from the album Felons and Revolutionaries
- Released: 2000
- Genre: Industrial metal; nu metal
- Length: 2:43
- Label: Epic
- Songwriters: Pete Burns; Steve Coy; Wayne Hussey; Tim Lever; Mike Percy
- Producers: Edsel Dope; John Travis

Dope singles chronology
"Everything Sucks" (1999)	"You Spin Me Round (Like a Record)" (2000)	"Now or Never" (2001)

Industrial metal band Dope covered the song on their debut studio album Felons and Revolutionaries (1999); the cover also appeared on the soundtrack for the film American Psycho. This version reached no. 37 on the Hot Mainstream Rock Tracks chart.

=== Charts ===
Weekly chart performance for "You Spin Me Round (Like a Record)" by Dope
Chart (2000)	Peak position
US Active Rock (Billboard)	30
US Mainstream Rock (Billboard)	37

== Jessica Simpson version ==
Jessica Simpson's version of the song was released as a promotional single from her fifth studio album A Public Affair in 2006. Her version of the song failed to break into the Billboard Hot 100, though it did reach no. 21 on the Bubbling Under Hot 100 Singles. Simpson's version has new lyrics and only preserves the chorus of the song.

=== Charts ===
Weekly chart performance for "You Spin Me Round (Like a Record)" by Jessica Simpson
Chart (2006)	Peak position
US Bubbling Under Hot 100 (Billboard)	21
US Pop 100 (Billboard)	95

== Other cover versions ==
- In 2007, Danzel released his version of "You Spin Me Round" which peaked at No. 32 in Belgium.
- In 2009, Alvin and the Chipmunks covered the song in the live-action/CGI film Alvin and the Chipmunks: The Squeakquel and its soundtrack.
- Flo Rida's 2009 single "Right Round" featuring Kesha, from his album R.O.O.T.S. interpolates elements of the song.
- In 2019, Paul Rudd and Jimmy Fallon recreated the original music video.
- In 2020, American industrial metal band 3Teeth released Guns Akimbo, a two-track set that included a cover version of "You Spin Me Round (Like a Record)". The song was previously featured in the 2019 action comedy film Guns Akimbo.
- Welsh drag queen The Vivienne released a cover in 2020, which appeared on their 2022 EP Bitch on Heels.

== See also ==
- List of number-one singles of 1985 (Canada)
- List of number-one singles of 1985 (Ireland)
- List of number-one hits of 1985 (Switzerland)
- List of UK Singles Chart number ones of the 1980s
