= Blutengel discography =

Discography

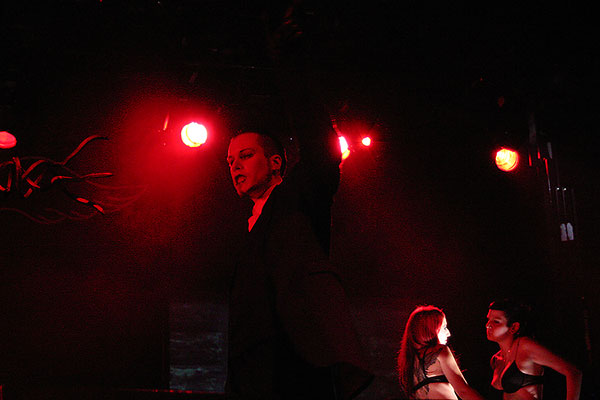
- Studio albums: 13
- EPs: 7
- Live albums: 5
- Compilation albums: 2
- Singles: 40
- Music videos: 22

The discography of Blutengel, a German darkwave band, consists of eleven studio albums, two compilation albums, twenty one singles, five extended plays, and many compilation and remixes.

== Albums ==
=== Studio albums ===
Year	Album	Chart positions		
Year	Album	GER	AUT	SWI
1999	Child of Glass	-	-	-
2001	Seelenschmerz	-	-	-
2002	Angel Dust	58	-	-
2004	Demon Kiss	53	-	-
2007	Labyrinth	36	-	-
2009	Schwarzes Eis	17	-	-
2011	Tränenherz	12	-	-
2013	Monument	4	-	96
2015	Omen	4	66	43
2017	Leitbild	4	-	49
2019	Un:Gott	2	-	99
2021	Erlösung - The Victory of Light	4	-	85
2023	Un:Sterblich - Our Souls Will Never Die	7	-	-
2025	Dämonen: Sturm	6	-	-

=== Compilations ===
Year	Album	Label
2014	Black Symphonies (An Orchestral Journey)	Out of Line
2016	Nemesis: The Best of & Reworked	Out of Line

=== Live albums/DVDs ===
Year	Live	Label
2005	Live Lines	Out of Line
2008	Moments of Our Lives	Out of Line
2013	Once in a Lifetime	Out of Line
2017	A Special Night Out: Live & Acoustic in Berlin	Out of Line
2018	Live im Wasserschloss Klaffenbach	Out of Line

=== Mini albums and EPs ===
Year	EP	Label
2005	The Oxidising Angel	Out of Line
2009	Soultaker	Out of Line
2011	Nachtbringer	Out of Line
2015	In alle Ewigkeit	Out of Line
2017	Black	Out of Line
2019	Damokles	Out of Line
2021	Fountain Of Destiny	Out of Line

== Singles / Maxi-CDs ==
Year	Single	Album	Label
2001	Bloody Pleasures	Seelenschmerz	Out of Line
2001	Black Roses	Non-album single	Out of Line
2002	Vampire Romance	Angel Dust	Out of Line
2003	Forever	Demon Kiss	Out of Line
2004	Mein Babylon (Stendal Blast & BlutEngel)	Non-album single	Out of Line
2004	No Eternity	Non-album single	Out of Line
2006	My Saviour	Non-album single	Out of Line
2007	Lucifer	Labyrinth	Out of Line
2008	Winter of My Life	Non-album single	Out of Line
2008	Dancing in the Light	Schwarzes Eis	Out of Line
2010	Promised Land	Non-album single	Out of Line
2010	Reich Mir Die Hand	Tränenherz	Out of Line
2011	Über Den Horizont	Tränenherz	Out of Line
2012	Save Our Souls	Monument	Out of Line
2013	You Walk Away	Monument	Out of Line
2013	Kinder dieser Stadt	Monument	Out of Line
2014	Krieger	Black Symphonies	Out of Line
2014	Asche zu Asche	Omen/Save Us	Out of Line
2015	Sing	Omen/Save Us	Out of Line
2016	Complete	Leitbild	Out of Line
2017	Lebe Deinen Traum	Leitbild	Out of Line
2018	Surrender to the Darkness	Un:Gott	Out of Line
2018	Vampire	Un:Gott	Out of Line
2020	Wir Sind Unsterblich	Non-album single	Out of Line
2020	Obscured (with Hocico)	Non-album single	Out of Line
2020	Nothing But A Void (with Massive Ego)	Non-album single	Out of Line
2021	The Victory of Light	Erlösung - The Victory of Light	Out of Line
2021	Wie Sand	Erlösung - The Victory of Light	Out of Line
2021	Wir Sind Das Licht	Erlösung - The Victory of Light	Out of Line
2021	Our Souls Will Never Die	Non-album single	Out of Line
2023	Dark History	Un:Sterblich - Our Souls Will Never Die	Out of Line
2023	Tief	Un:Sterblich - Our Souls Will Never Die	Out of Line
2023	We Belong to the Night	Un:Sterblich - Our Souls Will Never Die	Out of Line
2023	King of Blood	Un:Sterblich - Our Souls Will Never Die	Out of Line
2023	Living On the Edge of the Night (A Gothic Anthem)	Un:Sterblich - Our Souls Will Never Die	Out of Line
2023	You Walk Away (2K23 Anniversary Version)	Non-album single	Out of Line
2024	Der Sturm	Dämonen:Sturm	Out of Line
2024	Nothing Left (featuring Solar Fake)	Dämonen:Sturm	Out of Line
2024	She Wears Black	Dämonen:Sturm	Out of Line
2024	Angst	Dämonen:Sturm	Out of Line

== Music videos ==
Year	Video	Director
2005	"The Oxidising Angel"	PeeWee Vignold
2008	"Dancing in the Light"	Peter Dommaschk
2011	"Reich Mir Die Hand"	Silvan Büge
2011	"Über Den Horizont"	Silvan Büge
2011	"Nachtbringer"	Golomedia
2012	"Save Our Souls"	Silvan Büge
2012	"No Eternity (Piano Version)"	Annie Bertram
2013	"You Walk Away"	Horris Film
2013	"Kinder Dieser Stadt"	Horris Film
2014	"Krieger (Symphonic Version)"	Horris Film
2014	"Asche zu Asche"	Carlo Roberti
2014	"Sing"	Carlo Roberti
2014	"Kinder der Sterne (With Meinhard)"	Matteo vDiva Fabbiani & Chiara Cerami
2016	"Complete"	Peter Dommaschk
2017	"Lebe Deinen Traum"	Peter Dommaschk
2017	"Black"	Silvan Büge
2018	"Surrender to the Darkness"	
2018	"Vampire"	
2019	"Am Ende der Zeit"	Nils Freiwald
2019	"Morningstar"	
2020	"Wir Sind Unsterblich"	Chris Pohl
2020	"Nothing But A Void" with Massive Ego	Sven Friedrich
2025	"The Devil"	Victoria Anders

== Other releases ==
=== Exclusive tracks appearing on compilations ===
- 1998: Awake the Machines Vol.2 – Love
- 2000: Machineries of Joy – Fairyland (Female Version)
- 2001: Orkus Collection 2 – Hold Me (Just For This Night)
- 2002: Fear Section Vol.1 – Weg Zu Mir (Shicksals-Version 2002)
- 2002: Machineries of Joy Vol.2 – Waiting For You
- 2003: Machineries of Joy Vol.3 – Falling
- 2006: Machineries of Joy Vol.4 – Misery
- 2008: Awake The Machines Vol.6 - Born Again
- 2010: Electrostorm Vol.2 - Soultaker
- 2011: Awake The Machines Vol.7 - Death is Calling (Exclusive ATM Remix)
- 2012: Machineries of Joy Vol.5 - A Place Called Home
- 2012: Electrostorm Vol.3 - Anders Sein
- 2013: Electrostorm Vol.4 - When I Feel You
- 2014: Electrostorm Vol.5 - Krieger
- 2015: Electrostorm Vol.6 - Not Me (Leave In Silence)
- 2016: Electrostorm Vol.7 - Soul Of Ice (ReWorked)
- 2017: Electrostorm Vol.8 - Gott:Glaube
