= Nemesis: The Best of & Reworked =

Compilation album by Blutengel
- Released: 26 February 2016
- Genre: Darkwave
- Length: 55:27 (Standard)
- Label: Out of Line

Blutengel chronology
In alle Ewigkeit (2015)	Nemesis: The Best of & Reworked (2016)	Leitbild (2017)

Nemesis: The Best of & Reworked is a best-of compilation album by German futurepop band Blutengel. All the tracks on the first disc are re-recorded. The deluxe edition second disc features songs released between 2005 and 2015. In the collectors box set, there is also a DVD of all the music videos released to date.
Weg Zu Mir was released as a preview for Nemesis on their 2015 In Alle Ewigkeit EP. All tracks are taken from all albums and EPs, with the exception of Demon Kiss.
Two lyric videos were released, Children of the Night (Reworked) preceding the release by a week, and Soul of Ice (Reworked) on the day of the album's release. On 19 February, Children of the Night (Reworked) was also made available to download from the album.

== Track listing ==
CD1: Nemesis: Reworked
No.	Title	Original release	Length
1.	"Vampire Romance (Reworked)"	from Angel Dust	4:45
2.	"Children of the Night (Reworked)"	from Seelenschmerz	5:18
3.	"Behind the Mirror (Reworked)"	from Schwarzes Eis	3:51
4.	"Soul of Ice (Reworked)"	from Seelenschmerz	5:20
5.	"Die With You (Reworked)"	from Seelenschmerz	4:55
6.	"Black Roses (Reworked)"	from Black Roses	4:51
7.	"Lucifer (Reworked)"	from Labyrinth	4:57
8.	"Der Spiegel (Reworked)"	from Seelenschmerz	3:49
9.	"Engelsblut (Reworked)"	from Labyrinth	5:26
10.	"Weg Zu Mir (Reworked)"	from Child of Glass	4:27
11.	"Bloody Pleasures (Reworked)"	from Seelenschmerz	4:34
12.	"Reich Mir Die Hand (Reworked)"	from Tränenherz	3:44

CD2: Best of
No.	Title	Original release	Length
1.	"Sing"	from Omen	3:25
2.	"Asche zu Asche"	from Omen	4:25
3.	"Save Our Souls"	from Monument	4:22
4.	"You Walk Away"	from Monument	3:57
5.	"Seelenschmerz (Symphonic Version)"	from Black Symphonies	5:54
6.	"Ein Augenblick (Symphonic Version - Live at Gothic Meets Klassik)"	from Black Symphonies	5:00
7.	"No Eternity (Piano Version)"	from Dark & Pure Vol. 1	3:59
8.	"Dancing in the Light"	from Schwarzes Eis	4:59
9.	"Soultaker"	from Soultaker	6:13
10.	"Nachtbringer"	from Nachtbringer	4:03
11.	"The Oxidising Angel"	from The Oxidising Angel	4:52
12.	"Über Den Horizont"	from Tränenherz	4:17
13.	"Krieger (Electro Version)"	from Krieger	3:52
14.	"Monument"	from Monument	4:04

DVD: The Music Videos
No.	Title	Directed by	Length
1.	"The Oxidising Angel"	PeeWee Vignold	3:52
2.	"Dancing in the Light"	Peter Dommaschk	5:17
3.	"Nachtbringer"	Golomedia	4:01
4.	"Reich Mir Die Hand"	Silvan Büge	3:41
5.	"Über Den Horizont"	Silvan Büge	4:25
6.	"Save Our Souls"	Silvan Büge	4:18
7.	"No Eternity (Piano Version)"	Annie Bertram	3:55
8.	"You Walk Away"	Horris Film	3:54
9.	"Kinder Dieser Stadt"	Horris Film	3:31
10.	"Krieger (Symphonic Version)"	Horris Film	4:02
11.	"Asche Zu Asche"	Carlo Roberti	4:48
12.	"Sing"	Carlo Roberti	4:08
13.	"Kinder der Sterne (With Meinhard)"	Matteo vDiva Fabbiani & Chiara Cerami	4:33

== Credits ==
- Music and male vocals: Chris Pohl
- Female vocals: Ulrike Goldmann
