= Black Symphonies (An Orchestral Journey) =

Compilation album by Blutengel
- Released: 28 February 2014
- Label: Out of Line

Blutengel chronology
Once in A Lifetime (2013)	Black Symphonies (An Orchestral Journey) (2014)	Omen (2015)

Singles from Black Symphonies (An Orchestral Journey)
- 1. "Krieger" Released: 14 March 2014

Black Symphonies (An Orchestral Journey) is an orchestral compilation album from German futurepop band Blutengel. It was promoted as a classical 'best of'.

== Background ==
After performing at the first Gothic Meets Klassik festival 2012 at Neues Gewandhaus, Leipzig, 'Die With You' and 'Ein Augenblick', two of the eight songs played were played in their classical style during their Monument tour. They were recorded on the live album 'Once in A Lifetime'. The response to both the Gothic Meets Klassik and 'Once in A Lifetime' performance was positive, and Blutengel began a classical tour with the 'Monument Ensemble' performing the eight songs from Gothic Meets Klassik, plus five songs rewritten for the chamber ensemble. All of the tracks were arranged by Conrad Oleak, who did the original arrangements for the songs performed at Gothic Meets Klassik.

From this came 'Black Symphonies', and a new song entitled 'Krieger' (Warrior) with 'Legend' (Actually 'Legend Part 2' from the Monument bonus disc) and 'Monument' serving as an intro and outro to the album. It was released as a CD, CD+DVD and Box Set. The DVD has four performances from the Gothic Meets Klassik, including 'Die With You' and 'Ein Augenblick' which were omitted from the album itself. The box set contains the CD+DVD, a Black Symphonies T-shirt, a signed page of sheet music from 'Reich Mir Die Hand' and the Krieger single. The Krieger single was later released through digital retailers, but the music video to promote both the album and the single was set to the symphonic version of the song.

== Track listing ==
No.	Title	Original release	Length
1.	"Legend / Nachtbringer (Symphonic Version)"	from Monument / Nachtbringer	5:49
2.	"Krieger (Symphonic Version)"		4:04
3.	"Soultaker (Symphonic Version)"	from Soultaker	6:08
4.	"Über Den Horizont (Symphonic Version)"	from Tränenherz	4:17
5.	"Deine Welt (Symphonic Version)"	from Monument	4:15
6.	"Behind the Mirror (Symphonic Version)"	from Schwarzes Eis	6:15
7.	"Kinder Dieser Stadt (Symphonic Version)"	from Monument	3:29
8.	"Reich Mir Die Hand (Symphonic Version)"	from Tränenherz	3:55
9.	"Die Zeit (Symphonic Version)"	from Monument	5:08
10.	"Seelenschmerz (Symphonic Version)"	from Seelenschmerz	5:55
11.	"You Walk Away (Symphonic Version)"	from Monument	4:10
12.	"Monument (Symphonic Version)"	from Monument	4:05

DVD: Live from "Neues Gewandhaus Leipzig"
No.	Title	Length
1.	"Soultaker (Symphonic Version Live)"	6:32
2.	"Ein Augenblick (Symphonic Version Live)"	5:07
3.	"Die With You (Symphonic Version Live)"	4:42
4.	"Reich Mir Die Hand (Symphonic Version Live)"	7:10

Krieger
No.	Title	Length
1.	"Krieger (Electronic Single Version)"	3:52
2.	"Krieger (Lord of the Lost Version ft. Chris Harms)"	3:45
3.	"Grey City"	5:14

== Credits ==
- Written-By and male vocals: Chris Pohl
- Female vocals: Ulrike Goldmann
- Performer: The Monument Orchestra
- Arranged By, Mixed By, Producer, Soloist, Grand Piano: Conrad Oleak
- Mixed By, Soloist, Acoustic Guitar: Rainer Oleak
- Soloist, Cello: Ekaterina Zaplakhova
- Soloist, Clarinet: Uta Gerwig
- Soloist, Drums, Percussion: Michael Merkert
- Soloist, Viola – Mirjam Beyer
- Soloist, Violin: Charlotte Blumenberg
- Photography By: Mandy Privenau
- Recorded By [Vocal]: Mario Rühlicke
- Mastered By: Calyx Mastering
