= A Heart Whose Love Is Innocent =

Studio album by Tristesse de la Lune
- Released: November 17, 2003
- Genre: electropop
- Length: 52:18
- Label: Out of Line Music

Tristesse de la Lune chronology
Queen of the Damned (2003)	A Heart Whose Love Is Innocent (2003)	Ninive/Time is Moving (2005)

A Heart Whose Love Is Innocent is Tristesse de la Lune's first full-length album.

== Track listing ==
1. "Coriolis" – 4:47
2. "Die Andere In Dir" – 5:51
3. "Queen of the Damned (Album Version)" – 4:22
4. "Poisoned Souls" – 5:14
5. "Stone" – 3:58
6. "All the Pain" – 4:22
7. "Unsichtbare Erinnerung" – 4:16
8. "Eiskalte Liebe (feat. Erk Aicrag)" – 4:59
9. "Strangeland" – 4:46
10. "Ein Mensch Wie Du" – 5:41
11. "Desire" – 5:41
12. "Leave It All Behind" – 3:35

== Singles ==
- Eiskalte Liebe (feat. Hocico-singer Erk Aicrag), 2002
- Queen of the Damned, 2003
