= Totes Fleisch =

1995 single by Terminal Choice

Single by Terminal Choice

from the album "Totes Fleisch"
- Released: 26 October 1995
- Recorded: at Studio am Kleistpark
- Length: 20:56
- Songwriter(s): Chris Pohl
- Producer(s): Heiko Bender

Terminal Choice singles chronology
| ""Desiderius" (Demotape)" (1995) | "Totes Fleisch" (1995) | "Totes Fleisch (Remixes)" (1998) |

"Totes Fleisch" is a song composed by the rock band Terminal Choice, from their 1995 mini-album with the self title.

== Review ==
It was the band's first single it was published from Cyberware Productions and was limited of 1000 copies. In January 1998 released Terminal Choice a CD with remix versions from his song, it was limited of 666 copies hand numbered, from the 1998 overworked was the genre dance and is as a Megamix produced.

"Totes Fleisch"

Single by Miss Construction

from the album Kunstprodukt
- Released: 2008
- Recorded: 2008
- Genre: Electronic music
- Length: 4:36
- Label: Fear Section
- Songwriter(s): Chris Pohl

== Track list ==
1. Höllensog (7:32)
2. Serial Killer (5:00)
3. Totes Fleisch (5:44)
4. Time To Die (2:40)

== Covers ==
In 1999 released Chris Pohl of the Terminal Choice EP Venus an Blutengel Remix, 2008 covered Chris Pohl his song with his new project Miss Construction, the song begins with silver screen quotations from Kill Bill.

== Credits ==
- Lyrics and Music by Chris Pohl
- Recorded and Mixed by – Heiko Bender

Recorded and mixed at Studio am Kleistpark.
