= Staubkind =

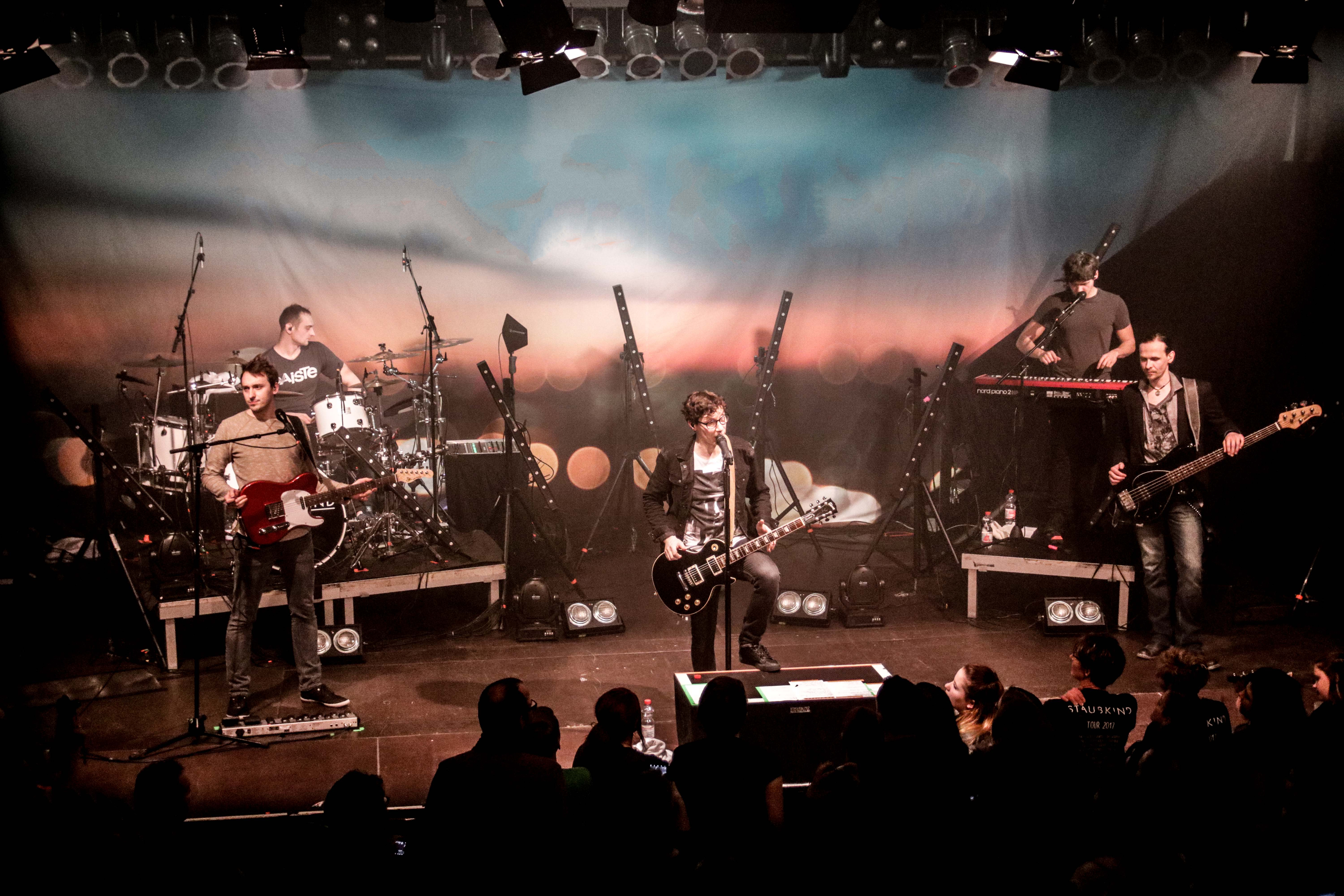
- Staubkind in 2017

Background information
- Genres: Pop rock; German rock; gothic rock (early)
- Years active: 2004–present
- Label: Out of Line Music
- Members: Sven Louis Manke; Daniel Lindenblatt; Friedemann "Friedel" Mäthger; Sebastian "Bassty" Scheibe; Henrik Böhl
- Past members: Rico Meerheim; Martin Ukrasvan; Dirk Lüthge
- Website: staubkind.de

Staubkind is a German rock band from Berlin, founded in 2004 by Sven Louis Manke (guitarist of Terminal Choice). Initially, Staubkind was a gothic rock act with a similar sound to other German bands like Zeraphine and Dreadful Shadows. Since the release of their third album Staubkind in 2012, their sound has become more Unheilig-oriented, incorporating pop rock, indie and modern Schlager music to their sound. All of their lyrics are written in German.

== History ==
Louis Manke, a singer and guitar player from Dresden, founded Staubkind in 2004. In the same year, the first single Keine Sonne and the debut album Traumfänger were published via the Berlin independent label Fear Section of singer and musician Chris Pohl. On 31 January 2004, Staubkind played their first official concert. On 3 April 2004, the band played the first big show supporting Unheilig at Sommercasino in Basel. The first big show on a festival took place at the 13th Wave-Gotik-Treffen in Leipzig. In autumn 2004, Staubkind continued playing live on their first own headlining tour through Germany, reaching up to 2005. On 31 January 2005, the debut album Traumfänger was re-released with some remixes and the bonus track Viel mehr. For the new song Viel mehr, Staubkind also shot their first video. On 1 October 2005, an EP including three new songs and two live tracks was published with the title Ausgebrannt. During the years of 2005 and 2006, Staubkind toured all over Germany and played shows at Wave-Gotik-Treffen in Leipzig and M'era Luna Festival in Hildesheim, among others. The second album Zu weit was published in October 2007. A tour through Germany during the years 2007 through 2009 followed, including gigs at Wave-Gotik-Treffen. In 2008/2009, Staubkind were invited to join the Unheilig & Friends shows by Unheilig. In the following years, there were more concerts and shows Staubkind played.

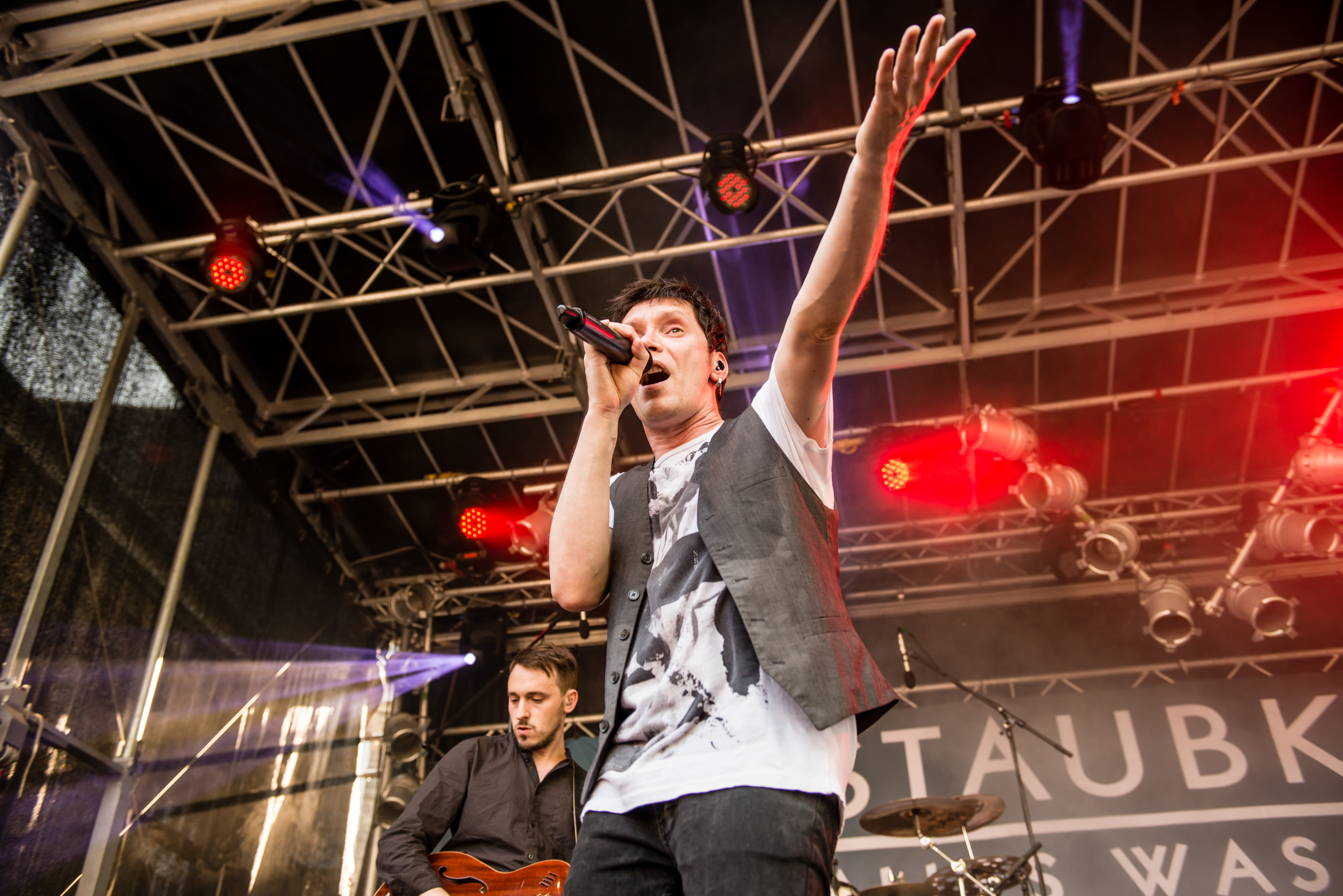
Staubkind at "Castle Rock Festival" (2015)

Louis Manke changed the record label and signed at Out of Line in Berlin in 2012. The singles Kannst du mich seh'n and So nah bei mir were published there in February and June 2012. There were videos for both pre-singles, too. On 29 June, the band's self-titled third album was released. It was developed in collaboration with Unheilig's producer Henning Verlage at the Principal Studios in Senden. The album reached number 37 of the German album charts and stayed there for nine weeks. It also reached number 57 of the Austrian and number 87 of the Swiss album charts. In summer 2012, Staubkind supported Unheilig's Lichter der Stadt tour. In autumn 2012, their headlining tour through Germany followed. Staubkind also played a concert with a classic orchestra at Gewandhaus Leipzig in November. At the end of the year 2012, the third single Nur ein Tag / Unendlich sein was published, including two live tracks of their concert at Wuhlheide Berlin.

In August 2012, guitarist Rico Meerheim left the band and was replaced by Martin Ukrasvan. In spring 2013, Staubkind supported Unheilig's Lichter der Stadt – Tour – Letzter Halt. In April 2013, the band started an acoustic tour. On that tour, the live album Wo wir zu Hause sind was recorded and was published in August of the same year. It reached the German album charts at number 33. Staubkind played the MDR charity festival Gemeinsam gegen die Flut in Ferropolis in summer 2013 and joined the M'era Luna Festival again.

In spring 2014, guitarist Martin Ukrasvan left the band and was replaced by Dirk Lüthge. On 18 July 2014, the fourth album Alles was ich bin was released with the digital pre-single Wunder. A video was published, too. It reached number 8 of the German album charts which meant the highest chart entry of Staubkind so far. In summer 2014, the band supported Unheilig again on their Alles hat seine Zeit tour. It was followed by an own headlining tour and the second single Was für immer bleibt. In November 2014, Staubkind appeared on German television in the soap opera Gute Zeiten, schlechte Zeiten on RTL. In spring 2015, the headlining tour was continued. Meanwhile, guitarist Dirk Lüthge left the band and was replaced by Daniel Lindenblatt. In summer of 2015, Staubkind joined the REWE Family Tour playing open-air shows. In autumn, they started their concert series Wo wir zu Hause sind playing on acoustic instrumentation in Nuremberg, at Planetarium Jena and Christuskirche Bochum.

== Members ==
Currently line-up

- Sven Louis Manke – vocals, guitar
- Daniel Lindenblatt (since 2015) – guitar
- Friedemann "Friedel" Mäthger – drums
- Sebastian "Bassty" Scheibe – bass
- Henrik Böhl – piano, keyboards

Former members

- Rico Meerheim – guitar (2004–2012)
- Martin Ukrasvan – guitar (2012–2014)
- Dirk Lüthge – guitar (2014–2015)

== Discography ==
=== Studio albums ===
- 2004: Traumfänger
- 2007: Zu weit
- 2012: Staubkind
- 2014: Alles was ich bin
- 2017: An jedem einzelnen Tag
- 2018: Hinter meinen Träumen
- 2023: Da ist immer noch mein Herz

=== Compilation album ===
- 2012: Fang dir deine Träume

=== Live album ===
- 2013: Wo wir zu Hause sind (Akustik Tour – Live)

=== Singles ===
- 2004: "Keine Sonne"
- 2005: "Ausgebrannt"
- 2012: "Kannst du mich seh'n"
- 2012: "So nah bei mir"
- 2012: "Nur ein Tag / Unendlich sein"
- 2014: "Wunder"
- 2014: "Was uns für immer bleibt"
- 2017: "Fliegen lernen"
- 2017: "Das Beste kommt noch"
- 2018: "Deine Zeit"
