= Miss Construction =

German electronic music band

- Origin: Germany
- Genres: electronic music, industrial music, EBM
- Years active: 2008–2015; 2025–present
- Label: Fear Section
- Members: Chris Pohl; Gordon Mocznay

Miss Construction is a German electronic music band from Berlin.

== History ==
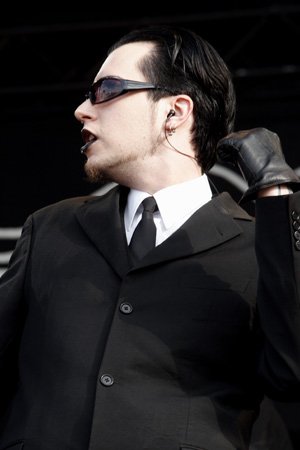
Chris Pohl, the founder of Miss Construction.

Miss Construction was formed by singer Chris Pohl in 2008, who also formed Blutengel. The band's first release was “Totes Fleisch”, a cover from Terminal Choice. This was followed by their debut album Kunstprodukt, released on 28 April 2008 by Out of Line sublabel Fear Section. The Project was debuted at WGT 2008 in Leipzig. In November 2013 the band released its second full-length album United Trash - The Z Files via Out of Line Music. As of 2025, Miss Construction has released their new singles: "Spiel mit mir" in October and "Back Again" in December.

== Current members ==
- Chris Pohl – Vocals, programming and lyrics
- Gordon Mocznay – Vocals, programming and lyrics

== Discography ==
=== Albums ===
- 2008: Kunstprodukt
- 2013: United Trash - The Z Files.

=== Singles ===
- 2026: F.M.P
- 2026: Heiß
- 2026: Hate
- 2025: Back Again
- 2025: Spiel mit mir

=== Videos ===
- 2008: Kunstprodukt
- 2013: Electrotanz

=== Appearances on compilation albums ===
- 2008: Pornostar (on New Signs & Sounds 04/08)
- 2008: Kunstprodukt (on Extreme Sündenfall 7)
- 2008: F**k Me Too (on Awake The Machines Vol. 6)
- 2010: Zombiefield (on Industrial For The Masses Vol. 4)
- 2011: Disco Schlampen (on Awake the Machines Vol. 7).

=== Remixes ===
- 2009: Blutengel – World Of Ice (Clubfire Remix on Soultaker)
- 2009: Wynardtage – I'm Not Your God (Not Your God Remix on Walk With The Shadows)
- 2011: Dance Or Die – Friendly Fire (MC Remix on Nostradamnation).
