= Schmertz =

Schmertz is a surname. Notable people with the surname include:

- Herbert Schmertz (born 1930), political affairs consultant
- Robert Schmertz (1926–1975), American real estate developer and sports franchise owner
- Thomas Schmertz (died 1702), Danish colonial administrator and governor of Dannemarksnagore

== See also ==
- Robert Schmertz Memorial Trophy
- Mittelschmerz
- Seelenschmerz
