= Tristesse de la Lune =

German electropop group

- Origin: Germany
- Genres: Electropop Darkwave
- Years active: 2002–2007
- Label: Out of Line Music
- Spinoff of: Blutengel
- Members: Gini Martin
- Past members: Kati Roloff (2002-2006)
- Website: www.tristessedelalune.de

Tristesse de la Lune (French: "Sadness of the Moon") was an electropop group founded by German musicians Kati Roloff and Gini Martin after they left Blutengel in 2002. Their songs typically have romantic lyrics and draw inspiration from their personal lives or books as well as movies. They carried over their previous contracts with Blutengel's label Out of Line Music.

Kati was no longer part of Tristesse de la Lune as of December 15th 2006. Gini continued into 2007 and had recorded six songs for a new album. A previously unreleased track "Erinnerung" was released on Out of Line Music compilation "Machineries of Joy Volume 5" in 2012.

== Discography ==
- Strangeland, 2002 (Promo)
- Eiskalte Liebe, 2002 (Maxi) – feat. Hocico-singer Erk Aicrag
- Queen of the Damned (Maxi) (2003)
- A Heart Whose Love Is Innocent, 2003
- Ninive/Time Is Moving, 2005 (Maxi)
- Limited Edition tracks / tracks on compilations (Selection):
  - "Dein Licht" on "Machineries of Joy Volume 2" Compilation CD (2002)
  - "Queen Of The Damned (Rough Mix)" on Advanced Electronics Vol. 2 Compilation CD (2003)
  - "Soulhunter" on "Machineries of Joy Volume 3" Compilation CD (2004)
  - "Let's Pretend" on "Machineries of Joy Volume 4" Compilation CD (2007)
  - "Erinnerung" on "Machineries of Joy Volume 5" Compilation CD (2012)
