= Seelenkrank =

German Darkwave music project

- Origin: Berlin, Germany
- Genres: Darkwave; Electro-industrial; EBM
- Years active: 1995–1998
- Labels: Maschinenwelt; Fear Section; Out of Line Music
- Spinoffs: Blutengel
- Spinoff of: Terminal Choice
- Past members: Chris Pohl; Nina Bendigkeit

Seelenkrank was a German Darkwave music project of Chris Pohl. The objective was to create a more intimate sound than the industrial stomp of Terminal Choice. Female vocals were included in this project, all of them performed by Nina Bendigkeit. Chris would go on to record two albums for the Machinenwelt Records in this style, though the name had to be dropped after Pohl left the label due to contractual issues. The project renamed to Blutengel after leaving Machinenwelt for Out of Line Music.

Due to legal difficulties, the albums were out of print for 10 years, although Chris Pohl has recently won the legal battle which has allowed him to reissue them on his own label Fear Section.

== Discography ==
- Pornopop (1995, demo)
- Silent Pleasures (1996; re-released 2005)
- Engelschrei (1997; re-released 2005)

Original albums were remastered and re-printed in 2005 by Fear Section with different cover art.

== Line-up ==
- Chris Pohl - Male vocals, lyrics and programming
- Nina Bendigkeit - Vocals and lyrics
