= Elwood Stray =

German metalcore band

- Origin: Essen, Germany
- Genres: Metalcore; post-hardcore
- Years active: 2016–present
- Label: Out of Line
- Members: Maik Nehrkorn; Fabian Petz; Niels Flor; Julian "Julle" Ristow; Raphael Sinz
- Past members: Raphael Kemmer
- Website: elwoodstray.com

Elwood Stray is a German metalcore band from Essen, formed in 2016. The band currently consists of vocalist Maik Nehrkorn, guitarist and vocalist Fabian Petz, guitarist Niels Flor, drummer Julian "Julle" Ristow and bassist Raphael Sinz.

After signing to Out of Line Music in 2022, they released their debut album, Gone With The Flow, the following year. In early 2026, they released their second album Descending.

== Discography ==
=== Albums ===
- Gone With The Flow (2023)
- Descending (2026)

=== EPs ===
- Burn the Bridge (2017)
- Triality (2021)
