= In alle Ewigkeit =

EP by Blutengel
- Released: 30 October 2015
- Genre: Darkwave
- Label: Out of Line

Blutengel chronology
Omen (2015)	In alle Ewigkeit (2015)	Nemesis: The Best of & Reworked (2016)

In alle Ewigkeit ("In All Eternity") is the fourth EP by German futurepop band Blutengel. "Weg zu mir" is a reworking of a track from their first album Child of Glass, and was released as a preview for Nemesis, their 2016 best-of compilation album. A video was released for "Kinder der Sterne" ("Children of the Stars"), which featured Meinhard, who released a version of the same song on his album Alchemusic II: Coagula, which featured Blutengel. There are two collaborations with dark-dance act Grenzgænger, and two demos of songs from Monument.

== Track listing ==
No.	Title	Length
1.	"In alle Ewigkeit"	4:20
2.	"Kinder der Sterne (with Meinhard)"	5:18
3.	"Between the Lines"	4:08
4.	"Weg zu mir (Rework 2015)"	4:28
5.	"Insane (feat. Grenzgænger)"	5:15
6.	"Nightlife (feat. Grenzgænger)"	5:08
7.	"Demons of the Past (You Walk Away Demo)"	4:09
8.	"Lebensrichter (Demo)"	4:39
9.	"In alle Ewigkeit (Alternative Version)"	4:46

== Credits ==
- Music and male vocals: Chris Pohl
- Female vocals: Ulrike Goldmann
