= Ten56. =

French deathcore/metalcore band

ten56.
- Origin: Paris, France
- Genres: Nu metalcore; nu deathcore
- Years active: 2020–present
- Label: Out of Line
- Members: Aaron Matts; Quentin Godet; Luka Garotin; Arnaud Verrier; Steeves Hostin
- Past members: Nicolas Delestrade

ten56. is a French nu metalcore band formed in 2020. Vocalist Aaron Matts founded the band upon his departure from Betraying The Martyrs.

Alongside Matts, the group consists of guitarists Quentin Godet and Luka Garotin, drummer Arnaud Verrier and bassist Steeves Hostin.

== History ==
The band initially formed in 2020 when vocalist Aaron Matts wanted to do "something, really heavy and dark" and "stupid heavy" in comparison to his other band, Betraying The Martyrs. He would eventually leave that band in 2021 to focus on ten56. fully.

Before coming up with the name ten56., taken from the US police code "10-56" which typically signifies a suicide or suicide attempt, Matts wanted the band to be called Downer, but ultimately decided against it upon coming across an Australian rapper using the same alias.

In April 2021, they released their debut track "Diazepam". Later that year, they released their debut EP Downer: Part 1. They released their second EP, Downer: Part 2, in January 2023. In September 2024, they released the single "Still Cursed" with deathcore band Cabal.

== Discography ==
=== Studio albums ===
- Downer (2023)
- IO (2025)

=== EPs ===
- Downer Part.1 (2021)
- Downer Part.2 (2023)

=== Singles ===
- "Diazepam" (2021)
- "Boy" (2021)
- "Sick Dog" (2021)
- "RLS" (2022)
- "Choky" (2023)
- "Good Morning" (2024)
- "ICU" (2024)
- "Still Cursed" (with Cabal; 2024)
- "Earwig" (2025)
- "Pig" (2025)
- "Pty Fck" (2025)
- "I Know Where You Sleep" (2025)
