= Moments of Our Lives =

Video by Blutengel
- Released: 28 August 2008
- Genre: Futurepop; Darkwave
- Label: Out of Line

Blutengel chronology
Labyrinth (2008)	Moments of Our Lives (2008)	Schwarzes Eis (2009)

Moments of Our Lives is the second live DVD from German futurepop band Blutengel. It was released as a double DVD and a limited edition featuring a CD of Moments of Our Lives.

== Track listing ==
DVD 1: Moments of Our Lives
No.	Title	Length
1.	"Intro (Live)"
2.	"Singing Dead Man (Live)"
3.	"Beauty And Delight (Live)"
4.	"Bloody Pleasures (Live)"
5.	"My Saviour (Live)"
6.	"Die With You (Live)"
7.	"Sunrise (Live)"
8.	"Keine Ewigkeit (Live)"
9.	"Black Roses (Live)"
10.	"Go to Hell (Live)"
11.	"I Remember Everything (Live)"
12.	"Lucifer (Live)"
13.	"Gloomy Shadows (Live)"
14.	"When the Rain is Falling (Live)"
15.	"Lovekiller (Live)"
16.	"Engelsblut (Live)"
17.	"Seelenschmerz (Live)"
18.	"The Oxidising Angel (Live)"
19.	"Children of the Night (Live)"
20.	"Der Spiegel (Live)"
21.	"Vampire Romance (Live)"

DVD 2: Bonus Features
No.	Title	Length
1.	"Ulli Performs "Lucifer""
2.	"Fan-Interview / Backstage in Bochum"
3.	"The Girls Take A Shower"
4.	"The Crew"
5.	"Blutengel-Soundcheck"
6.	"Get in (Bochum)"
7.	"The Oxidising Angel (feat. Sonja-Cam)"
8.	"Impressions"
9.	"Photo Gallery"
10.	"The Oxidising Angel (Music Video)"

Bonus CD: Moments of Our Lives
No.	Title	Length
1.	"Beauty And Delight (Live)"	4:59
2.	"Bloody Pleasures (Live)"	6:33
3.	"Die With You (Live)"	4:49
4.	"Keine Ewigkeit (Live)"	5:55
5.	"Go to Hell (Live)"	4:52
6.	"I Remember Everything (Live)"	5:34
7.	"Lucifer (Live)"	4:59
8.	"Gloomy Shadows (Live)"	5:37
9.	"When the Rain is Falling (Live)"	6:03
10.	"Lovekiller (Live)"	6:33
11.	"Engelsblut (Live)"	5:40
12.	"The Oxidising Angel (Live)"	4:54
13.	"Children of the Night (Live)"	6:07
14.	"Vampire Romance (Live)"	5:26
