= Kunstprodukt =

Studio album by Miss Construction
- Released: April 25, 2008
- Recorded: 2008
- Genres: Electronic music, industrial
- Length: 72:06
- Label: Fear Section
- Producer: Christian "Chris" Pohl

Kunstprodukt (lit. 'art product') is the debut album from German electronic music band Miss Construction.

== Content ==
The album begins with a punchy introduction featuring edgy sound patterns and an upbeat tempo. Immediately following the intro is the catchy "Miss Construction Theme." There are also songs with lyrics like Kunstprodukt dealing with the phenomenon of the super pop stars who get famous despite the fact that they seemingly lack artistic talent, or singing skills.

== Tracks ==
All tracks are written by Christian "Chris" Pohl.

No.	Title	Length
1.	"Intro"	2:29
2.	"Miss Construction Theme"	4:48
3.	"Kunstprodukt"	3:58
4.	"Eins und Zwei"	4:33
5.	"Headshot"	5:00
6.	"F**k Me, too"	4:26
7.	"Hass und Liebe"	5:11
8.	"Lunatic"	4:05
9.	"I Luv U"	4:59
10.	"Totes Fleisch"	4:36
11.	"Slaughterhouse"	4:59
12.	"F**k U bitch"	4:48
13.	"Pornostar"	4:24
14.	"Electro Beast"	5:02
15.	""Kunstprodukt" - (Gintronic Remix)"	3:41
16.	""Electro Beast" - (Dolls of Pain Remix)"	4:41
Total length:		72:06

== Information ==
- All tracks written and produced by Christian "Chris" Pohl
- Male vocals by Gordon Mocznay
- The woman on the album cover is the model Drastique Plastique
