= Rabia Sorda =

Mexican/German electro-industrial band

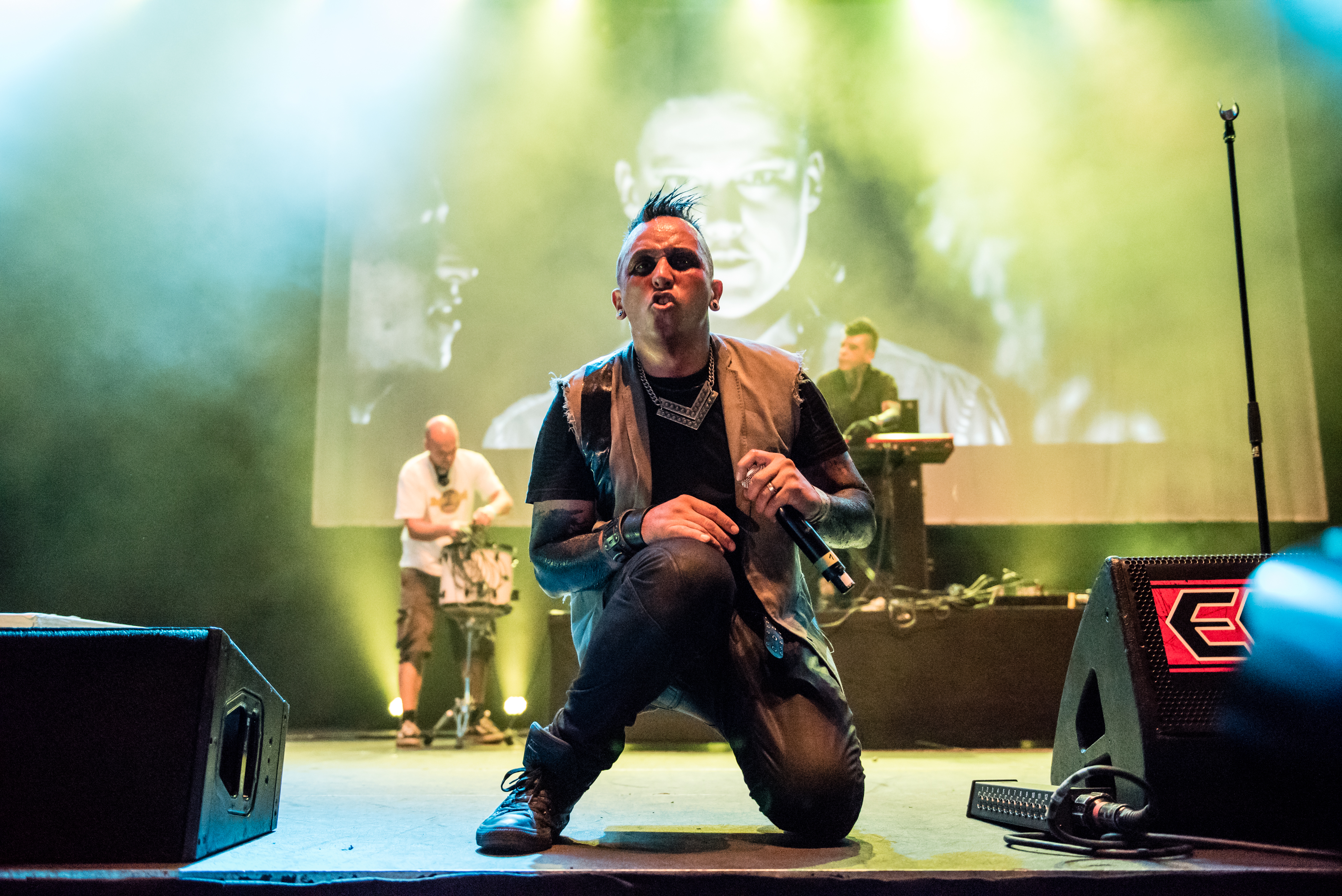
- Erk Aicrag performing with Rabia Sorda (Amphi Festival, Germany 2015)

Background information
- Origin: Mexico
- Genres: electro-industrial; industrial metal; post-punk
- Years active: 2003–present
- Labels: Out Of Line
- Spinoff of: Hocico
- Members: Erk Aicrag; Marco Rivagli (drums & backing vocals); Titus Garz (guitar & backing vocals); Touring Member: Giulia Mandelli (Dance & Percussion)
- Past members: Marcus Engel; "Maxx"; Jens Halbauer; Grigory Feil
- Website: www.rabiasorda.com

Rabia Sorda (translated: "Deaf Rage") is the side project of Erk Aicrag, lead singer of the Mexican aggrotech band Hocico. Rabia Sorda, like Hocico, is electronic music, though it is somewhat less aggressive and noisy than Hocico. While his main project, Hocico, goes down a certain path, Aicrag uses Rabia Sorda as a vehicle for his own musical creativity. He mixes different aspects ranging from ethnic influences to 1980s-style melodies and punky attitude to aggressive electronic music.

== History ==
Erik Garcia (aka Erk Aicrag) began solo work under the name Rabia Sorda as a side project to his work with the band Hocico as early as 2003. It was during a creative interlude for Hocico after 2004 and around the time that Garcia relocated solo to Germany that his work as Rabia Sorda began to take more of his creative energy. Although beginning from a creative frame similar to Hocico, Garcia's stated intent was to "explore music in a different direction."

By 2006, Garcia completed the first Rabia Sorda releases, the album Métodos Del Caos and single "Save Me From My Curse." These first releases were both produced by John Fryer of This Mortal Coil fame whose talents were enlisted through an introduction by the Out Of Line label.

The next round of Rabia Sorda releases came in 2009 with the album Noise Diary and EP Radio Paranoia, both also produced by John Fryer. With these releases Garcia began to realize more of his vision for creating a new style separate of Hocico, with greater rock and punk influences and emphasis on melody.

For the next set of releases, the 2012 single "Eye M the Blacksheep" (mastered by Eric Van Wonterghem of Absolute Body Control and Insekt) and the 2013 album Hotel Suicide, Erik began to work with additional musicians and evolve Rabia Sorda from a solo project into a band. Jens Halbauer (aka Jeans) provided drums & percussion on both releases while Grigory Feil and Jörg Wartmann (aka Warthy) provided guitar on numerous tracks. 2012 also saw the release of The Art of Killing Silence on Out of Line, which was a compendium of the band's first two albums, Métodos del Caos and Noise Diary.

Beginning with Animales Salvajes in 2014, Garcia brought on instrumentalist Marcus Engel who would become a formal member of the group.

By the time of the release of the double album The World Ends Today in 2018, the band realized Garcia's vision of a departure from the Hocico sound, with the blending of metal, punk, and industrial music styles. For World Ends the band, now a trio of Garcia, Engel, and "Maxx" on drums, worked with German guitarist and producer Nils Lesser to create a more guitar-driven, aggressive sound than was found in previous releases.

In 2020, the band continued the industrial metal & electro hybrid sound with the digital single Destruye. The single includes a remix by EBM band Leæther Strip and drum & bass producers Shadow Sect and is accompanied by a video produced by Liss Eulenherz.

== Discography ==
=== Albums ===
- Métodos del Caos (2006)
- Noise Diary (2009)
- The Art of Killing Silence (2012)
- Hotel Suicide (2013)
- The World Ends Today (2018)

=== EPs ===
- Save Me from My Curse (2006)
- Radio Paranoia (2009)
- Animales Salvajes (2014)
- King of the Wasteland (2016)

=== Singles ===
- Eye M the Blacksheep (2012)
- Destruye (2020)
