= Terminal Choice =

German rock band

- Origin: Berlin, Germany
- Genres: Electro-industrial, industrial rock, industrial metal, darkwave, EBM, Neue Deutsche Härte
- Years active: 1993–2011
- Labels: Cyberware Productions; Out of Line Music
- Spinoffs: Seelenkrank; Blutengel; Tumor; Pain of Progress; Miss Construction; Staubkind
- Members: Chris Pohl; Jens Gärtner; Gordon Mocznay; Louis Manke
- Past members: Manuel Selling; Sten Nitschke
- Website: terminal-choice.de

Terminal Choice was a German industrial rock band. It was formed by singer Chris Pohl (also of Blutengel, Tumor, Pain of Progress and owner of the Fear Section label) in 1993.

== History ==
Their lyrics are sung in German and English. The sound was originally primarily electronic music, but with the 1998 album Navigator, guitars were added.

Besides Pohl, the original lineup included Jens Gärtner, who provided the drums and loops. In 1997, Manuel Selling was added as a guitar player. He left in 2000 and Gordon Mocznay took over on guitar and bass guitar. Also in 2000, the band's album Ominous Future was ranked number 15 on the German Alternative Charts (DAC) Top 50 Albums of 2000.

A year later in 2001, Louis Manke joined the band as well, adding a second guitar to the band. An album entitled New Born Enemies was released in 2006 and four years later the band released the album Übermacht.

In 2017, Chris Pohl revealed in his biography that Terminal Choice is no longer active due to lack of time. No official statement has been released. The last release were the compilation albums Black Journey 1–3 released in 2011, the band's last gigs were in 2010.

== Members ==
=== Last lineup ===
- Chris Pohl – vocals (1993–2010)
- Jens Gärtner – drums (1997–2010)
- Gordon Mocznay – bass (2000–2010)
- Louis Manke – guitar (2001–2010)

=== Former members ===
- Manuel Selling – bass (1997–2000)
- Sten Nitschke – producer, remixer (1997–2000) (died 2011)

== Discography ==
=== Demo ===
- 1993: Terminal Choice
- 1994: Nightmare
- 1994: Facets of Pain
- 1994: Desiderius
- 1995: Degernerated Inclinations

=== Unlisted ===
- 1994: In Equal Shares / Split Tape
- 1994: Demonstrate the Power / titled as demo II

=== Full-length albums ===
- 1996: In the Shadow of Death
- 1998: Navigator
- 1999: Black Past (Rare – 1000 copies)
- 2000: Ominous Future – #15 DAC Top 50 Albums of 2000
- 2003: Buried a-Live (Live album)
- 2003: Menschenbrecher
- 2003: Reloadead ("Best of" album)
- 2006: New Born Enemies
- 2010: Übermacht
- 2011: Black Journey 1
- 2011: Black Journey 2
- 2011: Black Journey 3

=== EPs ===
- 1997: Khaosgott
- 1999: Venus
- 2002: Collective Suicide
- 2009: Keine Macht MCD

=== Singles ===
- 1995: Totes Fleisch
- 1998: Totes Fleisch Remixes
- 2000: No Chance – #39 DAC Top 100 Singles of 2000
- 2000: Fading
- 2000: Animal
- 2003: Injustice
- 2006: Don't Go – #11 DAC Singles
