= Once in a Lifetime (Blutengel album) =

Live album / DVD / Blu-ray by Blutengel
- Released: 1 November 2013
- Genre: Futurepop; Darkwave
- Label: Out of Line

Blutengel chronology
| Monument (2013) | Once in a Lifetime (2013) | Black Symphonies (An Orchestral Journey) (2014) |

Once in a Lifetime is a live album from German futurepop band Blutengel. It was recorded in Berlin and released as a 2xCD album, DVD, and Blu-ray. It is the first Blutengel release on Blu-ray format. Three of the songs performed were symphonic versions: Die With You & Ein Augenblick were both originally performed at 2012 Gothic Meets Klassik festival, and No Eternity was later performed along with a selection of songs from Monument for a classical tour. All three of these symphonic versions were omitted from their 2014 symphonic album Black Symphonies (An Orchestral Journey) and exist only on this album.

== Track listing ==
CD1
| No. | Title | Length |
|---|---|---|
| 1. | "Legend (Intro)" | 1:20 |
| 2. | "Nachtbringer (Live)" | 4:26 |
| 3. | "Tears Might Dry (Live)" | 5:09 |
| 4. | "Willst Du? (Live)" | 4:29 |
| 5. | "Vampire Romance (Live)" | 4:51 |
| 6. | "All These Lies (Live)" | 4:54 |
| 7. | "Deine Welt (Live)" | 4:06 |
| 8. | "Das Andere Ich (Live)" | 5:56 |
| 9. | "Die With You (Symphonic Version) (Live)" | 4:40 |
| 10. | "What You Get (Live)" | 4:24 |
| 11. | "Lebensrichter (Live)" | 4:17 |
| 12. | "Behind the Mirror (Live)" | 3:29 |
| 13. | "Lucifer (Live)" | 4:55 |

CD2
| No. | Title | Length |
|---|---|---|
| 1. | "Uns Gehört Die Nacht (Live)" | 4:19 |
| 2. | "Reich Mir Die Hand (Live)" | 3:40 |
| 3. | "Save Our Souls (Live)" | 4:17 |
| 4. | "You Walk Away (Live)" | 4:36 |
| 5. | "Kinder Dieser Stadt (Live)" | 3:26 |
| 6. | "Ein Augenblick (Symphonic Version) (Live)" | 5:18 |
| 7. | "No Eternity (Symphonic Version) (Live)" | 3:53 |
| 8. | "Bloody Pleasures (Live)" | 4:38 |
| 9. | "Engelsblut (Live)" | 5:48 |
| 10. | "Monument (Live)" | 4:09 |

DVD & Blu-ray: Once in A Lifetime Performance
| No. | Title | Length |
|---|---|---|
| 1. | "Legend (Intro)" | 1:20 |
| 2. | "Nachtbringer (Live)" | 4:26 |
| 3. | "Tears Might Dry (Live)" | 5:09 |
| 4. | "Willst Du? (Live)" | 4:29 |
| 5. | "Vampire Romance (Live)" | 4:51 |
| 6. | "All These Lies (Live)" | 4:54 |
| 7. | "Deine Welt (Live)" | 4:06 |
| 8. | "Das Andere Ich (Live)" | 5:56 |
| 9. | "Die With You (Symphonic Version) (Live)" | 4:40 |
| 10. | "What You Get (Live)" | 4:24 |
| 11. | "Lebensrichter (Live)" | 4:17 |
| 12. | "Behind the Mirror (Live)" | 3:29 |
| 13. | "Lucifer (Live)" | 4:55 |
| 14. | "Uns Gehört Die Nacht (Live)" | 4:19 |
| 15. | "Reich Mir Die Hand (Live)" | 3:40 |
| 16. | "Save Our Souls (Live)" | 4:17 |
| 17. | "You Walk Away (Live)" | 4:36 |
| 18. | "Kinder Dieser Stadt (Live)" | 3:26 |
| 19. | "Ein Augenblick (Symphonic Version) (Live)" | 5:18 |
| 20. | "No Eternity (Symphonic Version) (Live)" | 3:53 |
| 21. | "Bloody Pleasures (Live)" | 4:38 |
| 22. | "Engelsblut (Live)" | 5:48 |
| 23. | "Monument (Live)" | 4:09 |

DVD & Blu-ray: Extras
| No. | Title | Length |
|---|---|---|
| 24. | "Save Our Souls (Music Video)" | 4:37 |
| 25. | "You Walk Away (Music Video)" | 4:04 |
| 26. | "Kinder Dieser Stadt (Music Video)" | 3:31 |
| 27. | "Behind the Scenes: Blutengel Live Koncert" | 5:43 |
| 28. | "After the Show" | 1:25 |
| 29. | "Making of: You Walk Away" | 2:37 |
| 30. | "Making of Kinder Dieser Stadt" | 1:55 |
