= Omen (Blutengel album) =

Omen / Save Us (2016)

Studio album by Blutengel
- Released: 13 February 2015
- Genre: Futurepop, darkwave
- Label: Out of Line

Blutengel chronology
| Black Symphonies (An Orchestral Journey) (2014) | Omen / Save Us (2016) (2015) | In alle Ewigkeit (2016) |

Singles from Omen
- 1. "Asche zu Asche" Released: 14 November 2014; 2. "Sing" Released: 23 January 2015

Omen is the ninth studio album from German futurepop band Blutengel. It was released as a single CD, 2xCD digipack with a bonus disc, and a collectors edition box set with the 2xCD album and an EP entitled Dark & Pure Volume 2 featuring stripped down piano & guitar acoustic versions of songs from Omen, arranged and performed by Conrad Oleak with Chris and Ulrike.

Omen was preceded by two singles, Asche zu Asche and Sing, both with accompanying music videos directed by Carlo Roberti.

Due to a legal dispute, its title had to be changed and got a re-release in 2016 under the new name Save Us.

== Track listing ==
| No. | Title | Length |
|---|---|---|
| 1. | "Prologue: Omen" | 1:40 |
| 2. | "Sing" | 3:23 |
| 3. | "The Siren" | 3:41 |
| 4. | "Wir sind was wir sind (We Are What We Are)" | 4:12 |
| 5. | "Give Me" | 4:42 |
| 6. | "The War Between Us" | 3:53 |
| 7. | "Fire in the Distance" | 4:04 |
| 8. | "Dein Gott (Your God)" | 4:23 |
| 9. | "Guilty" | 5:21 |
| 10. | "Save Us" | 3:59 |
| 11. | "Der Regen fällt… (The Rain Falls...)" | 4:22 |
| 12. | "Ich bin das Feuer (I Am the Fire)" | 4:21 |
| 13. | "Holy Blood" | 4:13 |
| 14. | "Asche zu Asche (Ashes to Ashes)" | 4:24 |
| 15. | "Bow Down" | 4:18 |
| 16. | "Elegy" | 4:30 |

Legend
| No. | Title | Length |
|---|---|---|
| 1. | "Inside of Me" | 5:17 |
| 2. | "Save Your Tears" | 4:55 |
| 3. | "Am Abgrund (In the Abyss)" | 4:29 |
| 4. | "Starkeeper" | 4:08 |
| 5. | "Fire in the Distance (Blutengel vs. Terminal Choice)" | 4:04 |
| 6. | "Stay (With Me)" | 3:36 |
| 7. | "Lovesong?" | 4:50 |
| 8. | "Asche zu Asche (Static Violence Remix)" | 4:00 |

Dark & Pure Volume 2
| No. | Title | Length |
|---|---|---|
| 1. | "Sing (Acoustic Version)" | 3:37 |
| 2. | "Give Me (Acoustic Version)" | 4:43 |
| 3. | "Save Us (Acoustic Version)" | 3:59 |
| 4. | "Wir sind was wir sind (Acoustic Version)" | 4:16 |
| 5. | "Der Regen fällt… (Acoustic Version)" | 4:22 |

iTunes Bonus Tracks
| No. | Title | Length |
|---|---|---|
| 25. | "Not Me (Leave in Silence)" | 4:09 |

Save Us (25th Anniversary Edition) CD2
| No. | Title | Length |
|---|---|---|
| 1. | "Inside of Me" | 5:16 |
| 2. | "Save Your Tears" | 4:54 |
| 3. | "Am Abgrund" | 4:28 |
| 4. | "Starkeeper" | 4:08 |
| 5. | "Fire in the Distance (Blutengel vs. Terminal Choice)" | 4:04 |
| 6. | "Stay (With Me)" | 3:35 |
| 7. | "Lovesong?" | 4:50 |
| 8. | "Asche zu Asche (Static Violence Remix)" | 4:00 |
| 9. | "Insensitive World" | 3:51 |
| 10. | "In alle Ewigkeit" | 4:19 |
| 11. | "Kinder der Sterne (with Meinhard)" | 3:54 |
| 12. | "Between the Lines" | 4:07 |
| 13. | "Weg zu mir (Rework 2015)" | 4:28 |
| 14. | "Insane (Blutengel vs. Grenzgænger)" | 5:15 |
| 15. | "Nightlife (Blutengel vs. Grenzgænger)" | 5:08 |
| 16. | "Not Me (Leave in Silence)" | 4:10 |
