= Child of Glass (album) =

Studio album by Blutengel
- Released: February 22, 1999
- Length: 74:07
- Label: SPV Records

Blutengel chronology
Child of Glass (1999)	Seelenschmerz (2001)

Child of Glass is the debut album by German band Blutengel. A 25th-anniversary edition remaster of the album was released with a bonus disc of rare tracks.

== Track listing ==
No.	Title	Length
1.	"Introduction"	1:16
2.	"Beauty of Suffering"	6:11
3.	"Goddess of Lies"	7:38
4.	"Weg zu mir"	6:39
5.	"Das Blut der Ewigkeit"	4:52
6.	"My Time"	5:25
7.	"Desire"	3:03
8.	"Du tanzt"	5:48
9.	"Leave the World"	5:53
10.	"No God"	7:12
11.	"Warriors of Destiny"	6:58
12.	"Suicide"	5:54
13.	"Demon of Temptation"	4:48
14.	"Footworship"	2:22

Child of Glass (25th Anniversary Edition) CD2
No.	Title	Length
1.	"Love"	5:24
2.	"Black Roses (Single Edit V. 2)"	4:47
3.	"Die with You (Still Suffering Remix)"	4:40
4.	"Black Roses (Opposite Sex)"	4:53
5.	"Black Roses (White Light Version)"	5:59

== Info ==
- All tracks written and produced by Christian "Chris" Pohl
- Male vocals by Chris Pohl
- Female vocals on "Weg zu mir" by Kati Roloff
- Lyrics and female vocals on "Desire", "Suicide" and "Love" by Nina Bendigkeit
- Female vocals on "Footworship" by Kati Roloff and Nina Bendigkeit

"Love" was an unreleased track from the Child of Glass recording sessions, which was later released on the 1998 compilation Awake the Machines Vol. 2.

Nina Bendigkeit left the band after the album release to become a photographer and was replaced by Gini Martin in 2001.

A 2015 rework of "Weg zu mir" was released on the In alle Ewigkeit EP as a teaser for Nemesis: The Best of & Reworked.
