= Live im Wasserschloss Klaffenbach =

Live album by Blutengel
- Released: 27 April 2018
- Recorded: 17 July 2017
- Venue: Wasserschloss Klaffenbach, Chemnitz
- Genre: Futurepop; Darkwave
- Label: Out of Line

Blutengel chronology
A Special Night Out: Live & Acoustic in Berlin (2017))	Live im Wasserschloss Klaffenbach (2018)

Live im Wasserschloss Klaffenbach is the fifth live DVD from German darkwave band Blutengel. It was released as a DVD, Blu-ray, 2CD and a limited edition 2CD/DVD/Blu-ray set. Footage and audio were recorded at their 'Nemesis - Open Air Festival' concert from Wasserschloss Klaffenbach, Chemnitz, Germany on 17 July 2017.

== Track listing ==
Live im Wasserschloss Klaffenbach DVD/Blu-ray
No.	Title	Length
1.	"Sing (Live in Klaffenbach)"
2.	"The War Between Us (Live in Klaffenbach)"
3.	"Children of the Night (Live in Klaffenbach)"
4.	"Vampire Romance (Live in Klaffenbach)"
5.	"Lucifer (Live in Klaffenbach)"
6.	"Soul of Ice (Live in Klaffenbach)"
7.	"Bloody Pleasures (Live in Klaffenbach)"
8.	"Save Us (Live in Klaffenbach - Acoustic Version)"
9.	"Wir Sind Was Wir Sind (Live in Klaffenbach - Acoustic Version)"
10.	"Weg zu Mir (Live in Klaffenbach)"
11.	"Kinder der Sterne (Live in Klaffenbach)"
12.	"Engelsblut (Live in Klaffenbach)"
13.	"Krieger (Live in Klaffenbach)"
14.	"Asche zu Asche (Live in Klaffenbach)"
15.	"Dein Gott (Live in Klaffenbach)"
16.	"Save Our Souls (Live in Klaffenbach)"
17.	"Der Spiegel (Live in Klaffenbach)"
18.	"You Walk Away (Live in Klaffenbach)"
19.	"Black Roses (Live in Klaffenbach)"
20.	"Seelenschmerz (Live in Klaffenbach)"
21.	"Reich mir die Hand (Live in Klaffenbach)"
22.	"Monument (Live in Klaffenbach)"
23.	"Blutengel Backstage (Chris Cam) (Bonus)"
24.	"Blutengel Backstage (Paddy Cam) (Bonus)"
25.	"Blutengel Soundcheck (Bonus)"
26.	"Comparison: Soundcheck vs. Show (Bonus)"

Live im Wasserschloss Klaffenbach CD1
No.	Title	Length
1.	"Sing (Live in Klaffenbach)"	5:55
2.	"The War Between Us (Live in Klaffenbach)"	4:30
3.	"Children of the Night (Live in Klaffenbach)"	5:31
4.	"Vampire Romance (Live in Klaffenbach)"	4:57
5.	"Lucifer (Live in Klaffenbach)"	5:07
6.	"Soul of Ice (Live in Klaffenbach)"	6:38
7.	"Bloody Pleasures (Live in Klaffenbach)"	6:38
8.	"Save Us (Live in Klaffenbach - Acoustic Version)"	4:44
9.	"Wir Sind Was Wir Sind (Live in Klaffenbach - Acoustic Version)"	4:53
10.	"Weg zu Mir (Live in Klaffenbach)"	4:59
11.	"Kinder der Sterne (Live in Klaffenbach)"	3:59

Live im Wasserschloss Klaffenbach CD2
No.	Title	Length
1.	"Engelsblut (Live in Klaffenbach)"	6:10
2.	"Krieger (Live in Klaffenbach)"	5:09
3.	"Asche zu Asche (Live in Klaffenbach)"	5:01
4.	"Dein Gott (Live in Klaffenbach)"	5:04
5.	"Save Our Souls (Live in Klaffenbach)"	5:08
6.	"Der Spiegel (Live in Klaffenbach)"	4:53
7.	"You Walk Away (Live in Klaffenbach)"	4:53
8.	"Black Roses (Live in Klaffenbach)"	5:03
9.	"Seelenschmerz (Live in Klaffenbach)"	5:10
10.	"Reich mir die Hand (Live in Klaffenbach)"	4:25
11.	"Monument (Live in Klaffenbach)"	7:04
