= Live Lines =

Video by Blutengel
- Released: 2 May 2005
- Genre: Futurepop; Darkwave
- Label: Out of Line

Blutengel chronology
Demon Kiss (2004)	Live Lines (2005)	The Oxidising Angel (2005)

Live Lines is the first live DVD from German futurepop band Blutengel. It was released as a DVD and a limited edition featuring a CD version of Live Lines.

== Track listing ==
Live Lines DVD
No.	Title	Length
1.	"Angels of the Dark (Live)"	8:22
2.	"Forever (Live)"	4:42
3.	"Bloody Pleasures (Live)"	6:35
4.	"Solitary Angel (Live)"	5:07
5.	"Weg zu Mir (Schicksalsversion 2002 Live)"	5:06
6.	"Angel of the Night (Live)"	5:12
7.	"Go to Hell? (Live)"	5:04
8.	"No Eternity (Live)"	3:51
9.	"Die With You (Live)"	4:52
10.	"Ice Angel (Live)"	6:17
11.	"Resurrection (Live)"	5:57
12.	"Kingdom (Live)"	5:18
13.	"Navigator (Live)"	5:32
14.	"Frozen Heart (Live)"
15.	"Black Wedding (Dark Embrace Remix Live)"	5:55
16.	"Love Killer (Live)"	7:44
17.	"Seelenschmerz (Live)"	5:48
18.	"Vampire Romance Part 1 (Live)"	5:35
19.	"Beauty of Suffering (Live)"	6:27
20.	"Children of the Night (Live)"	6:35
21.	"No Eternity (Videoclip)"	3:43
22.	"Angels of the Dark (Videoclip)"	4:29
23.	"Schmerz 1 - Liebe (Videoclip)"	6:43
24.	"Schmerz 2 - Lust (Videoclip)"	3:26
25.	"Schmerz 3 & 4 - Einsamkeit & Tod (Videoclip)"	5:06

Live Lines CD
No.	Title	Length
1.	"Angels of the Dark (Live)"	5:05
2.	"Forever (Live)"	4:46
3.	"Bloody Pleasures (Live)"	6:31
4.	"Solitary Angel (Live)"	5:09
5.	"No Eternity (Live)"	3:49
6.	"Go to Hell? (Live)"	4:57
7.	"Die With You (Live)"	4:58
8.	"Resurrection (Live)"	5:53
9.	"Love Killer (Live)"	8:00
10.	"Vampire Romance Part 1 (Live)"	4:55
11.	"Beauty of Suffering (Live)"	6:35
12.	"Children of the Night (Live)"	5:04
