= Leitbild =

Studio album by Blutengel
- Released: 17 February 2017
- Genre: Futurepop; darkwave
- Length: 2:14:38 (Digital/Box set)
- Label: Out of Line

Blutengel chronology
Nemesis: The Best of & Reworked (2016)	Leitbild (2017)	Black (2017)

Singles from Leitbild
- 1. "Complete" Released: 2 December 2016; 2. "Lebe Deinen Traum" Released: 3 February 2017

Leitbild is the tenth studio album from German futurepop band Blutengel, released on 17 February 2017. It was released as a single CD, two-disc digipak with a bonus disc, and a collector's edition box set with the two disc album and a shaped MCD that features a rework of "Anders Sein" plus two songs off Leitbild in symphonic and acoustic versions. It also has two disc audiobook of Chris Pohl's Lebe Deinen Traum.

Leitbild was preceded by the single "Complete", and later Lebe Deinen Traum, both with accompanying music videos directed by Peter Dommaschk.

== Track listing ==
Leitbild
No.	Title	Length
1.	"Welcome to Your New Life"	6:16
2.	"Lebe deinen Traum"	3:42
3.	"Waste My Time"	4:19
4.	"Leitbild"	3:54
5.	"Black"	4:25
6.	"Scars"	4:43
7.	"Unser Weg"	4:12
8.	"Immortal"	4:23
9.	"The Days of Justice"	4:38
10.	"Complete"	4:35
11.	"Gott : Glaube"	4:32
12.	"Say Something"	4:35
13.	"Wasting the Years"	5:17
14.	"Alle Wunden"	4:40
15.	"The Way You Feel"	4:22
16.	"Der Himmel brennt"	4:27

Deluxe edition bonus disc
No.	Title	Length
1.	"Eternal Souls"	4:38
2.	"I Surround You"	5:03
3.	"One Last Time"	4:24
4.	"Killing Memories" (Alternative)	5:04
5.	"The Plague"	5:56
6.	"Seelenschmerz" (Reworked)	4:13
7.	"Eternal Souls" (Pseudokrupp Project)	5:01
8.	"Leitbild" (Ost+Front Remix)	3:33
9.	"Say Something" (Batfloor – Hocico Club Mix)	4:54
10.	"Waste My Time" (featuring Helalyn Flowers)	3:57

Anders Sein MCD
No.	Title	Length
1.	"Anders Sein" (Rework 2017 - Still Different)	4:44
2.	"Der Himmel brennt" (symphonic version)	4:48
3.	"Wasting the Years" (acoustic version)	5:22

== Charts ==
Chart (2017)	Peak position
German Albums (Offizielle Top 100)	4
Swiss Albums (Schweizer Hitparade)	49
