= Schwarzes Eis =

Studio album by Blutengel
- Released: 13 February 2009
- Label: Out of Line

Blutengel chronology
Moments of Our Lives (2008)	Schwarzes Eis (2009)	Soultaker (2009)

Singles from Schwarzes Eis
- 1. "Dancing in the Light" Released: 14 November 2008

Schwarzes Eis (Black Ice) is the sixth studio album from German band Blutengel. It was released as a single CD and 2x CD limited edition, and 3x CD box set. Dancing in the Light was released as a single preceding the album, with an accompanying music video.

== Track listing ==
Schwarzes Eis
No.	Title	Length
1.	"Behind the Mirror"	6:00
2.	"Kind der Nacht"	4:47
3.	"City Lights"	4:12
4.	"My Nightmare"	4:22
5.	"Pure Life"	4:18
6.	"The Only One"	5:14
7.	"Dancing in the Light"	5:03
8.	"Schneekönigin"	5:35
9.	"My Darkest Nights"	5:48
10.	"The Dream"	5:03
11.	"Dreh dich nicht um"	4:56
12.	"Broken Girl"	5:36
13.	"Secret Places"	5:14
14.	"Schatten"	5:41
15.	"Nightfall"	4:47

Behind the Mirror
No.	Title	Length
1.	"Mirror I - Birth"	6:45
2.	"Mirror II - Journey"	3:48
3.	"Mirror III - Confusion"	8:29
4.	"Mirror IV - Seduction"	4:16
5.	"Mirror V - Hope"	5:27
6.	"Mirror VI - Suffering"	4:01
7.	"Mirror VII - Homecoming"	4:38
8.	"Mirror VIII - Death"	7:34

Redemption
No.	Title	Length
1.	"Guardian Angel"	4:57
2.	"Our Empire"	5:03
3.	"The Princess"	5:11
4.	"Redemption"	6:10
5.	"Waiting for the Night"	5:45
6.	"Schatten (Club Mix)"	4:49
7.	"Schwarzes Herz"	6:00
8.	"In the Shadows"	5:57
9.	"Winter of My Life (V.2.0)"	5:06
10.	"Weine nicht um mich"	6:21

Schwarzes Eis (25th Anniversary Edition) CD2
No.	Title	Length
1.	"Guardian Angel"	4:57
2.	"Our Empire"	5:02
3.	"The Princess"	5:11
4.	"Redemption"	6:10
5.	"Waiting for the Night"	5:45
6.	"Schatten (Club Mix)"	4:48
7.	"Schwarzes Herz"	6:00
8.	"In the Shadows"	5:56
9.	"Weine nicht um mich"	6:21
10.	"Winter of My Life"	4:58
11.	"Point of No Return"	3:49
12.	"Black Angels"	5:34
13.	"You Will Be a Woman"	4:53
14.	"Not Too Late"	5:07
