= Hocico =

Mexican electro-industrial band

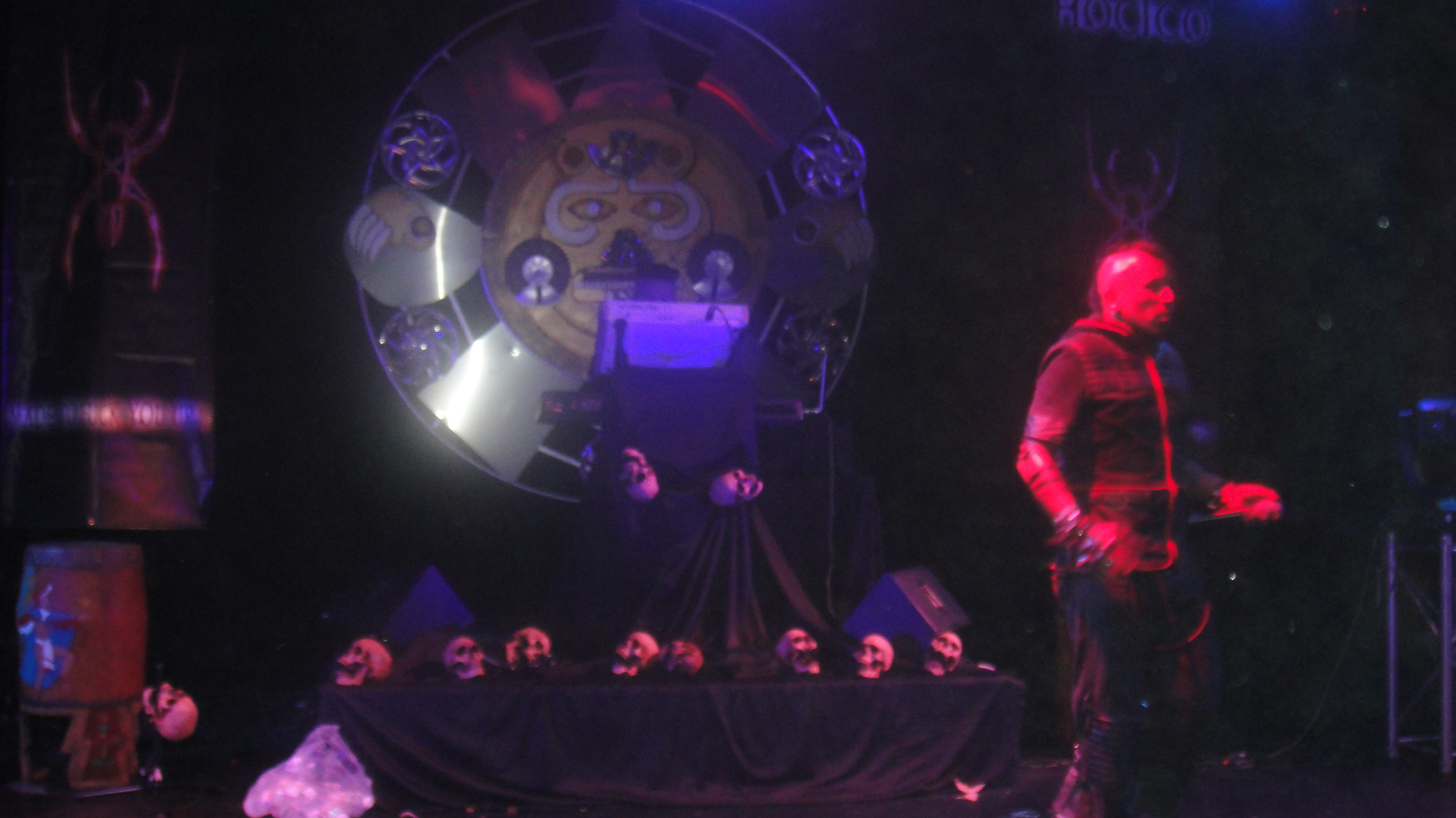
- Hocico at Lunario del Auditorio Nacional in 2009

Background information
- Origin: Mexico City, Mexico
- Genres: Aggrotech; electro-industrial
- Years active: 1993–present
- Labels: Out of Line Music; Opción Sónica
- Spinoffs: Rabia Sorda; Dulce Liquido
- Spinoff of: Niñera Degenerada; Hocico de Perro
- Members: Erk Aicrag; Racso Agroyam
- Website: www.hocico.com

Hocico (Spanish pronunciation: [oˈsiko]) is a Mexican electro-industrial duo that was formed in 1993 in Mexico City.

== History ==
Hocico was officially formed in 1993 by cousins Eric García (aka Erk Aicrag) and Óscar Mayorga (aka Racso Agroyam), with Eric writing lyrics and performing the vocals and Óscar responsible for the programming. They had experimented with electronic music since they were teenagers and were influenced by industrial artists such as Skinny Puppy. Their interest in the industrial and EBM genres led them to begin their musical career in 1989 in a group called Niñera Degenerada. In 1992 the two cousins left the band and went on to form Hocico de Perro.

Soon after they dropped the "de Perro" and continued simply as Hocico. The Spanish word "hocico" translates to 'snout' or 'muzzle' in English, and is used in Mexico as a disrespectful way to describe someone's comments coming out of their mouth. In certain contexts, "cállate el hocico" could be interpreted as, essentially, "shut your fucking mouth," which the band thought described their musical attitude well.

Between 1993 and 1996 the band produced several cassette demos - Misuse, Abuse And Accident, Autoagresión Persistente, and Triste Desprecio. In 1997 the band released their first full CD, Odio Bajo El Alma, on the label Opción Sónica with European distribution through Out Of Line.

The release of Odio Bajo El Alma was well received in Europe and America but caught the Anglo- and Euro-centric scene by surprise, with many unaware that the band's style of electronic music was happening in Mexico. In fact, before 1997, Hocico along with many other Mexico City-based electronic bands had been part of a collective called La Corporación that attempted to support and promote their type of music across Mexico. Other bands involved in La Corporación included Cenobita, Ogo, Encefálisis, and Deus Ex Machina.

The end of the 1990s saw two more albums released on Out Of Line: the live album Los Hijos Del Infierno, recorded during the band's 1998 European tour, and Sangre Hirviente. In 1999, the band played at the Zillo festival in Germany and the Euro Rock festival in Belgium. The band returned to Europe in 2000 to play the Elegi Festival in Paris and the Woodstage Festival in Germany, the latter having an attendance of more than 20,000 people. In 2001, Hocico opened for German band Rammstein during their Mexican tour.

In 2002, the band released the album Signos De Aberración (translated: Signs of Aberration), the subject matter of which treated on disturbing events within their social environment at the time.

After the release of their 2004 album, Wrack And Ruin, the band went on a short hiatus. During this interlude, the band took time to finish their first DVD, A Través De Mundos Que Arden, and to help produce other Mexican bands, while Eric also focused on his solo project, Rabia Sorda. Eric also relocated during this time to Leipzig, Germany while Óscar remained primarily in Mexico City.

In 2008, Hocico returned with the album Memorias Atrás, with the theme of "leaving memories behind." The album was released in three versions, one of which was a box set with 3D cover artwork.

Since 2008 the band has released an album roughly every two years, interspersed with various live albums, compilations, and singles. 2017's release, The Spell of the Spider, reached #42 on the German national charts. 2019's Artificial Extinction deals with the concept of artificial intelligence as a threat to humanity and features artwork by German artist Jochen Schilling. Artificial Extinction reached #30 on the German national charts.

== Style and influences ==
Hocico's songs are performed in both Spanish and English. The band prefers to use English in order to reach a greater audience, but also wrote songs in Spanish to connect specifically with their home audience.

The band is known for producing an aggressive style of electronic music, which they attribute to their experiences growing up and living in Mexico City. In a 2003 interview, the band stated:

We deal with a lot of violence. Sometimes you walk in Mexico City you see a lot of it. It’s about where we live and things that happen to us. We’d explode without the music.

Stylistically, the band's music is centered in the electro-industrial and EBM genres and, in particular, the "aggrotech" sub-genre. In later years the band have also produced tracks in an aggressive, industrial style of drum and bass.

Hocico has toured extensively over their career with their live shows projecting the same sort of aggressive energy of their musical style, sometimes to the point of physical injury. Their two-person stage presence has taken more of a visual presence over the years including, at times, the addition of performers such as mariachi musicians and Aztec-themed dancers.

The band's musical influences include electronic and industrial bands such as Skinny Puppy, Leæther Strip, Pouppée Fabrikk, Ministry, Cat Rapes Dog, and Depeche Mode as well as punk bands like Suicidal Tendencies and Dead Kennedys. The band also has an affinity for heavy metal and, although typically billed live with other industrial/EBM acts or similarly curated events, they have played at metal music festivals such as Force Metal Fest 2015 in Guadalajara along with Judas Priest and Overkill.

== Side projects and collaborations ==
Aicrag has a side project called Rabia Sorda while Agroyam has one called Dulce Liquido.

In 2002, Aicrag contributed vocals to the Tristesse de la Lune track, Eiskalte Liebe.

In 2016, Aicrag contributed music and vocals to the Ost+Front album Ultra and their "Fiesta De Sexo" Maxi.

In April 2020, Blutengel and Hocico jointly created a track named "Obscured" and released it as a maxi single in preparation for their European "Living the Darkness" tour.

== Discography ==
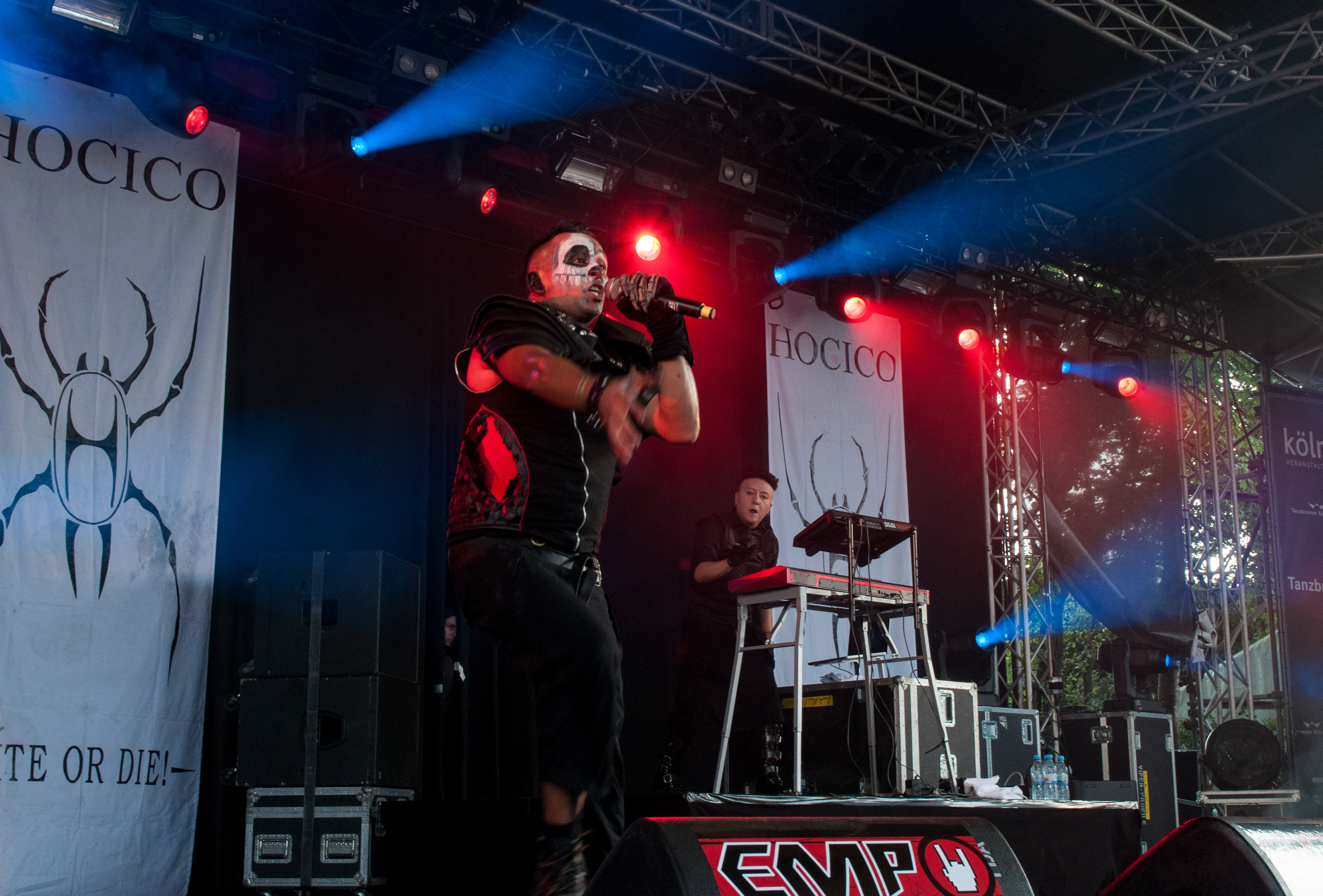
Hocico at Amphi Festival 2014 in Cologne, Germany

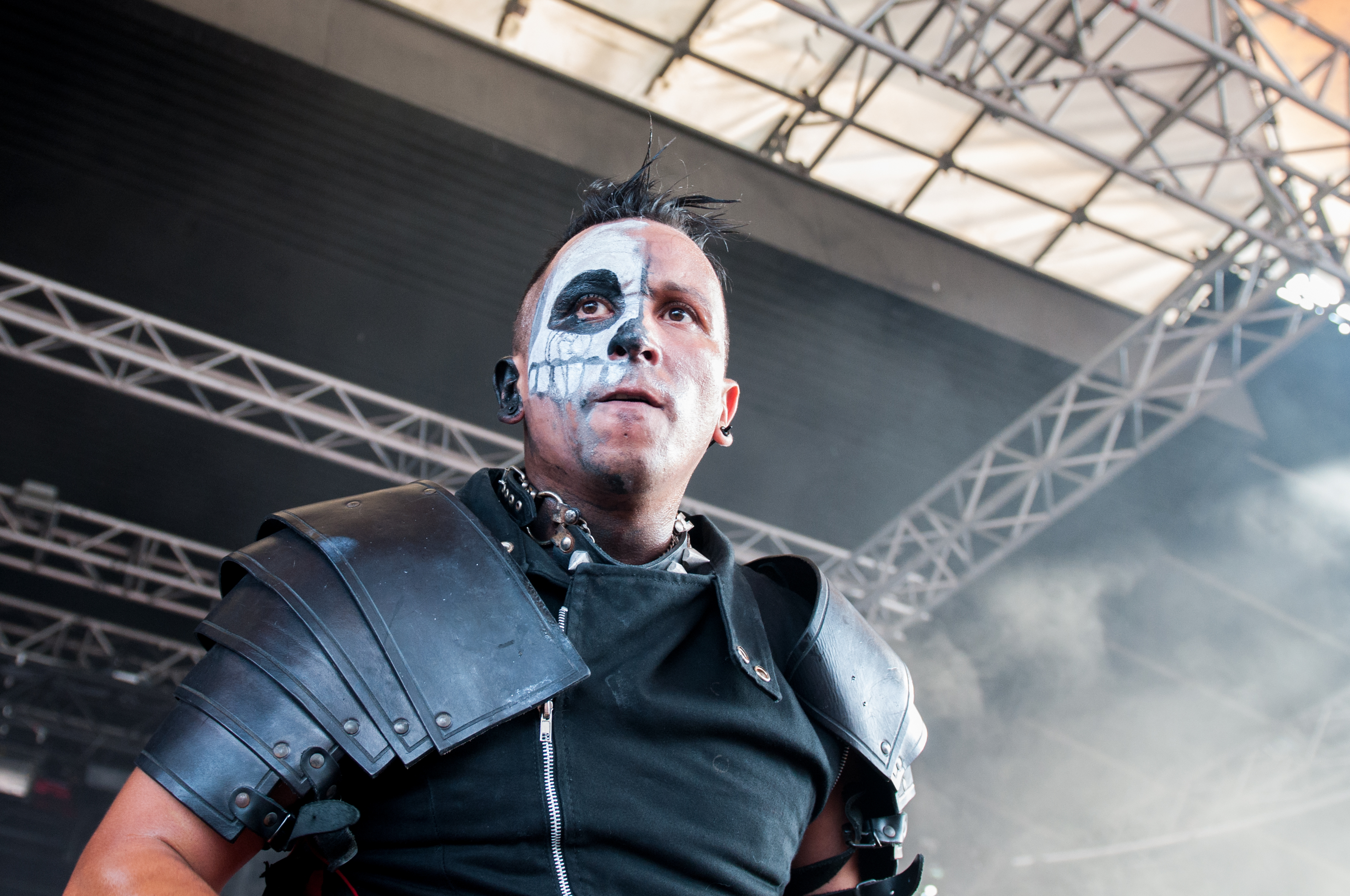
Erk Aicrag, 2014

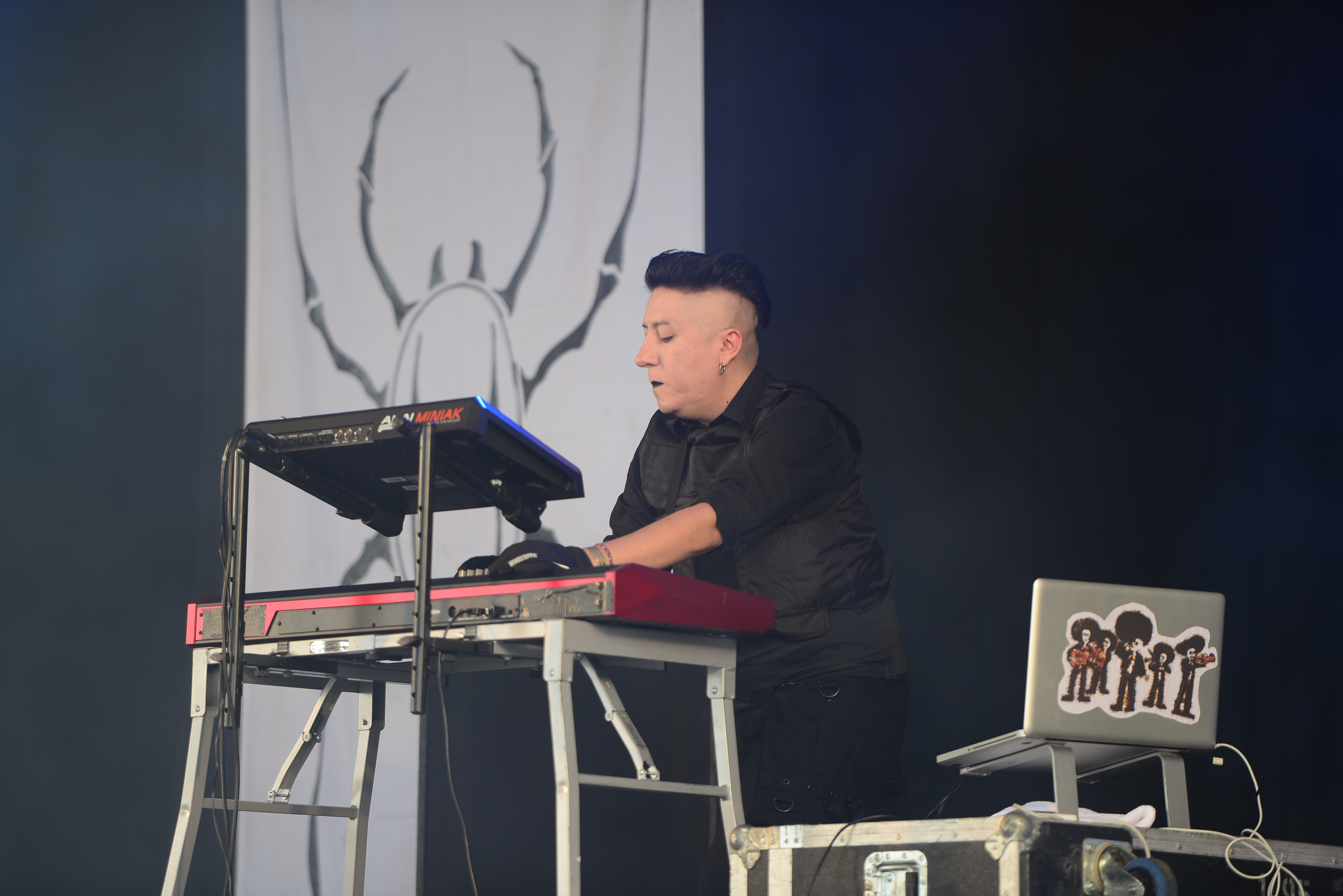
Racso Agroyam, 2014

=== Demos ===
- Misuse, Abuse and Accident (1993)
- Autoagresión Persistente (1994)
- Triste Desprecio (1996)

=== Albums ===
- Odio Bajo El Alma (1997)
- Sangre Hirviente (1999) – #19 CMJ RPM Charts (U.S.)
- Signos de Aberración (2002)
- Hate Never Dies: The Celebration 4CD (2003) Limited to 2500 copies Featuring the band’s Demos
- Wrack and Ruin (2004)
- Memorias Atrás (2008)
- Tiempos de Furia (2010)
- El Ultimo Minuto (2012)
- Los dias caminando en el fuego (2013)
- Ofensor (2015)
- The Spell of the Spider (2017)
- Artificial Extinction (2019)
- Hyperviolent (2022)
- Unseen Horror Scenes (2026)

=== EPs ===
- El Día De La Ira (1998)
- Cursed Land (1998)
- Aquí Y Ahora En El Silencio (2000) – #16 DAC Top 100 Singles of 2000, Germany
- El Día De La Ira Re-released (2002)
- Silent Wrath (2002) Available in Signos de Aberración Limited Edition
- Disidencia Inquebrantable (2003)
- Maldiciones Para Un Mundo En Decadencia (2004) Available in Wrack And Ruin Limited Edition
- Scars (2006) Available in A Traves De Mundos Que Arden DVD Limited Edition
- About A Dead (2007)
- The Day the World Stopped (2008) Available in Memorias Atrás Digipack Edition

=== Singles ===
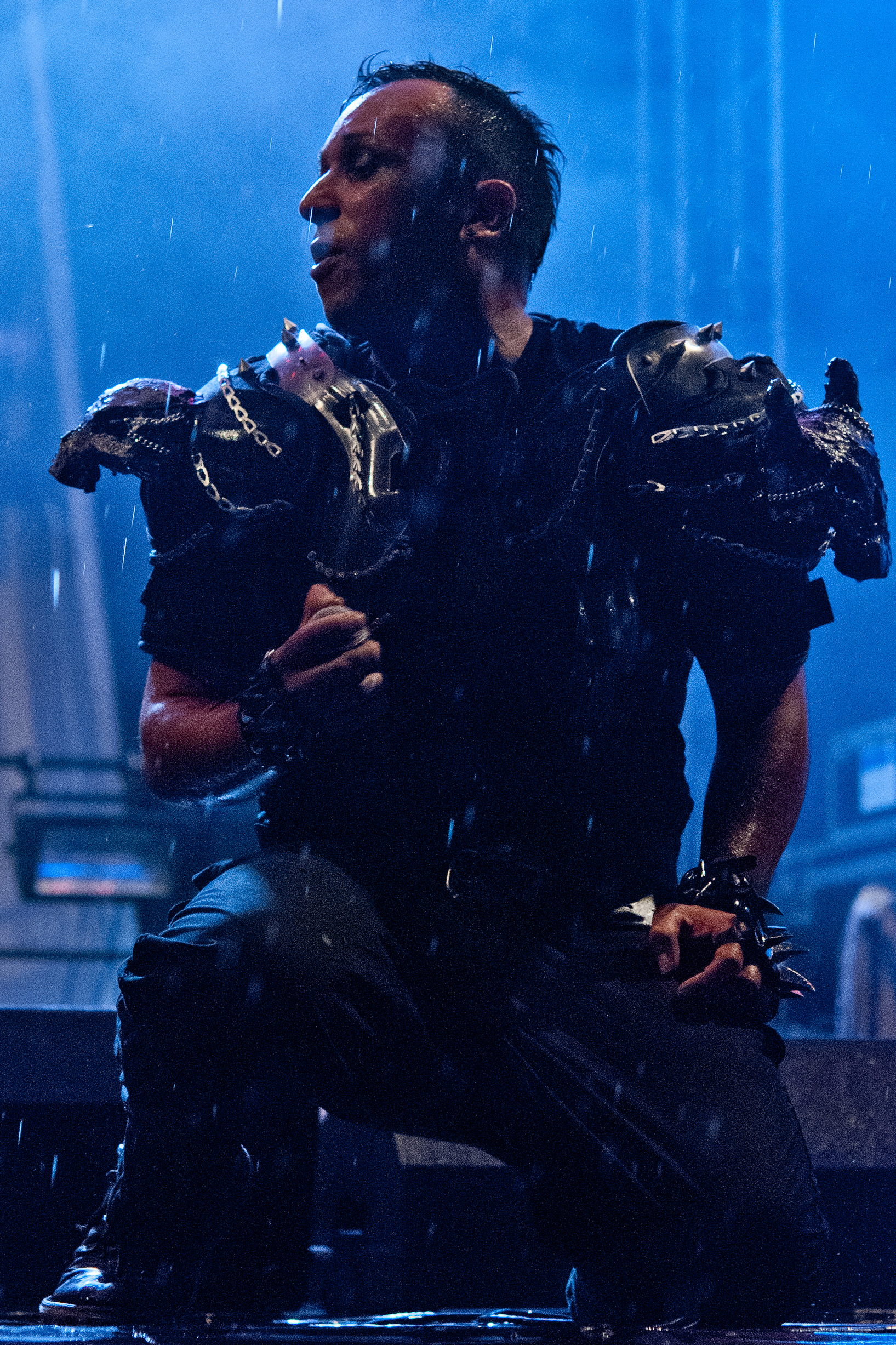
CASTLE PARTY PRODUCTIONS in Bolków.

- Untold Blasphemies (2001)
- Born to be Hated (2004)
- Not Like You (Apestas! Version)(2006) Promo Single – #3 DAC Singles, Germany
- The Shape of Things to Come (2007) Limited Edition 1000 copies
- Dog Eat Dog (2010) Limited Edition
- Bite Me (2011)
- Vile Whispers (2012)
- In the Name of Violence (2015)
- Forgotten Tears (2015)
- I, Abomination (2017)
- Spider Bites (2017)
- Dark Sunday (2019)
- Psychonaut (2019)
- Cross the Line (feat. Tragedy of Mine) (2019)
- Obscured (with Blutengel) (2020)
- Lost World (2021)
- Backstabbers (2021)
- A Symphony Of Rage (2023)
- The Screen (2025)

=== Live recordings ===
- Los Hijos Del Infierno (1998)
- Tierra Eléctrica (1999)
- Blasphemies in the Holy Land (Live in Israel) (2005) Limited to 2000 copies Recorded Live By Maor Appelbaum
- Tora! Tora! Tora! (2008)
- Blood on the Red Square (2011)
- Die Hölle Über Berlin (2014)
- Blasphemies in the Holy Land Part 2 (Shalom from Hell Aviv) (2018)

=== Vinyl ===
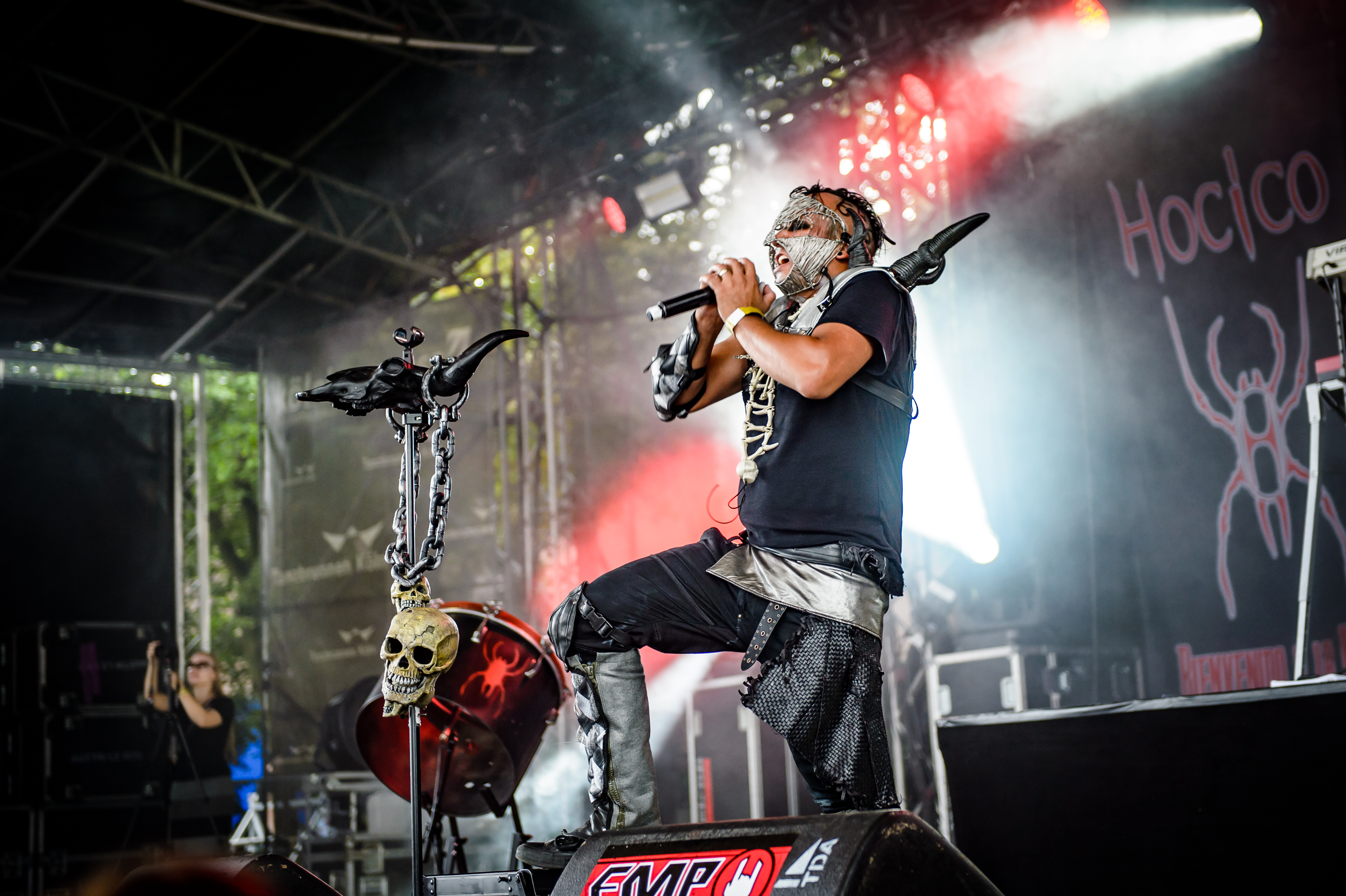
Amphi Festival 2017

- Born to Be (Hated) (2004)
- Wrack and Ruin 2LP (2004) Boxset Limited to 1000 copies
- Dog Eat Dog (2010) Limited to 666 copies

=== DVD ===
- A Traves De Mundos Que Arden (2006)
- Blood On The Red Square (2011)
- Die Hölle über Berlin (2014)
