= The Oxidising Angel =

EP by Blutengel
- Released: 28 October 2005
- Label: Out of Line

Blutengel chronology
Live Lines (2005)	The Oxidising Angel (2005)	Labyrinth (2007)

The Oxidising Angel is the first EP from German futurepop band Blutengel. It was released as a single CD. It featured a cover of Cry Little Sister the theme from the film The Lost Boys originally by Gerard McMann. On the original CD release, tracks 12 & 13 were hidden as part of track 11, The Oxidising Angel (Single Edit) which put the track time at 11:56. A music video was released for the title track, The Oxidising Angel.

== Track listing ==
No.	Title	Length
1.	"The Oxidising Angel"	4:53
2.	"Cry Little Sister"	4:49
3.	"Burning Heaven"	6:00
4.	"A Little Love"	5:12
5.	"Leave the Day"	5:13
6.	"Angel of the Dark (Remixed By Lost Area)"	4:38
7.	"Falling (Remixed By Angelus Mortus)"	4:25
8.	"Navigator (ft. Sara Noxx, Remixed By Noxx / Rilinger)"	5:03
9.	"The Oxidising Angel (Remixed By Control System)"	4:51
10.	"Leave The Day (Crystal Tears Remix)"	5:21
11.	"The Oxidising Angel (Single Edit)"	3:52
12.	"Change the Future"	4:27
13.	"Hidden Track"	0:18
