= Angel Dust (Blutengel album) =

Studio album by Blutengel
- Released: September 30, 2002
- Genre: Synth-pop
- Length: 79:26
- Labels: Out of Line and SPV Records (Germany)
- Producers: Chris Pohl; Jens Gärtner

Blutengel chronology
Seelenschmerz (2001)	Angel Dust (2002)	Demon Kiss (2004)

Singles from Angel Dust
- 1. "Vampire Romance" Released: 23 August 2002

Professional ratings
Review scores
Source	Rating
Gothtronic	(7.5/10)

Angel Dust is the third studio album by Blutengel and the first featuring Constance Rudert and Eva Pölzing as female vocalists. Vampire Romance Part I was released as a single preceding the album.

== Track listing ==
Angel Dust
No.	Title	Length
1.	"Angel Dust I"	3:47
2.	"Stranded"	5:15
3.	"Vampire Romance Part I"	6:22
4.	"The End of Love"	6:13
5.	"Iron Heart"	5:02
6.	"Our Time"	5:44
7.	"Wonderland"	5:14
8.	"Angel Dust II"	2:50
9.	"Black Wedding"	3:38
10.	"I Will Follow"	4:59
11.	"Silent Death"	3:46
12.	"Angel of the Night"	5:09
13.	"Keine Ewigkeit"	5:46
14.	"Night of Sin"	4:54
15.	"Vampire Romance Part II"	5:49
16.	"Angel Dust III"	5:01

Limited Edition Bonus CD
No.	Title	Length
1.	"Dark Skies"	4:42
2.	"Black Wedding (Dark Embrace Remix)"	5:35
3.	"The End of Love (Remix by Black Heaven)"	5:01
4.	"Her Song"	2:26

Angel Dust (25th Anniversary Edition) CD2
No.	Title	Length
1.	"Dark Skies"	4:42
2.	"Black Wedding (Dark Embrace Remix)"	5:36
3.	"The End of Love (Remix by Black Heaven)"	5:01
4.	"Her Song"	2:27
5.	"Vampire Romance (Edit)"	4:29
6.	"Vampire Romance (Solitary Experiments Remix)"	5:27
7.	"Vampire Romance (Dark Ambient Mix)"	4:59
8.	"Vampire Romance (TrümmerWelten Remix)"	5:46
9.	"Vampire Romance (Inscape Remix)"	5:31
10.	"Vampire Romance (Crystal Dance Mix)"	5:07
11.	"Waiting For You"	4:03

== Credits ==
- All tracks written and produced by Christian "Chris" Pohl
- Additional loops by Jens Gärtner
- Male vocals by Chris Pohl
- Female vocals on "Vampire Romance part I", "Our Time," "Black Wedding" and "Vampire Romance part II" by Constance Rudert
- Female vocals on "Wonderland" and "Angel of the Night," by Eva Pölzing
- Female vocals on "Keine Ewigkeit" by Constance Rudert and Eva Pölzing

=== Bonus CD ===
- Female vocals on "Her Song" by Constance Rudert
