= Labyrinth (Blutengel album) =

Studio album by Blutengel
- Released: 17 September 2007
- Genre: Futurepop
- Label: Out of Line

Blutengel chronology
The Oxidising Angel (2005)	Labyrinth (2007)	Moments of Our Lives (2008)

Singles from Labyrinth
- 1. "Lucifer" Released: 13 July 2007

Labyrinth is the fifth studio album from German future pop band Blutengel. It entered the German Top 50 Albums Chart at 36 for a week. The album spawned a popular single, titled "Lucifer." It is the first studio album to feature Ulrike Goldmann on female vocals, alongside Constance Rudert. Lucifer was released as 2 cd's, entitled Purgatory and Blaze.

== Track listing ==
Labyrinth
No.	Title	Length
1.	"Into the Labyrinth"	3:01
2.	"Singing Dead Men"	5:37
3.	"A New Dawn"	4:55
4.	"Beauty and Delight"	4:50
5.	"Dreamland"	5:12
6.	"Gloomy Shadows"	5:31
7.	"Shame"	6:26
8.	"Body Move"	4:10
9.	"When the Rain is Falling"	5:46
10.	"I Remember (Everything)"	5:21
11.	"Lucifer"	4:52
12.	"Sunrise"	5:15
13.	"Behind Your Mask"	4:01
14.	"Engelsblut"	5:16
15.	"Escape (Outro)"	3:00

Bonus Disc
No.	Title	Length
1.	"Lucifer (Dubmixx By Jenne)"	4:59
2.	"Born Again"	5:28
3.	"Stormy Rivers"	4:50
4.	"Victory of Death"	6:23
5.	"Snowblind"	5:35
6.	"Soul of Ice (Live 2007)"	6:16
7.	"Love Killer (Live 2007)"	6:08
8.	"Body Move (Remix)*"	4:05

- Hidden Track, appears after 62 tracks of silence & 6:06 of silence on CD.

Labyrinth (25th Anniversary Edition) CD2
No.	Title	Length
1.	"Lucifer (Dubmixx By Jenne)"	5:00
2.	"Born Again"	5:28
3.	"Stormy Rivers"	4:51
4.	"Victory of Death"	6:24
5.	"Snowblind"	5:31
6.	"Soul of Ice (Live 2007)"	6:16
7.	"Love Killer (Live 2007)"	6:09
8.	"Body Move (Remix)"	4:05
9.	"My Saviour"	4:01
10.	"Verdammnis"	5:37
11.	"In Winter"	3:35
12.	"Seelenschmerz 2007 (Reworked by Eminence of Darkness)"	6:09
13.	"Misery"	4:43
14.	"Black Roses 2007 (Reworked by Eminence of Darkness)"	4:49
