= Tränenherz =

Studio album by Blutengel
- Released: 18 February 2011
- Genre: Futurepop; Darkwave
- Label: Out of Line

Blutengel chronology
Soultaker (2009)	Tränenherz (2011)	Nachtbringer (2011)

Singles from Tränenherz
- 1. "Reich Mir Die Hand" Released: 21 January 2011; 2. "Über Den Horizont" Released: 15 April 2011

Tränenherz (Teardrop heart) is the seventh studio album from German electronic band Blutengel. It was released as a single CD, 2x CD double album and limited edition double album with bonus disc. The bonus disc to the limited edition is an instrumental album called Signs of the Zodiac.
To promote the album, two singles were released with accompanying music videos for Reich Mir Die Hand and Über Den Horizont.

== Track listing ==
Tränenherz
No.	Title	Length
1.	"Tränenherz - Prologue"	3:03
2.	"Über den Horizont (Over the Horizon)"	4:17
3.	"The Lost Children"	4:30
4.	"Save Me"	4:51
5.	"Irgendwann (Sometime)"	4:48
6.	"The Watcher"	4:46
7.	"Ordinary Darkness"	5:44
8.	"Reich mir die Hand (Give Me Your Hand)"	3:25
9.	"Down on My Knees"	5:11
10.	"Doomsday"	4:43
11.	"Undone"	3:49
12.	"The End"	6:07
13.	"Das andere Ich (The Other Me)"	5:56
14.	"Ein Augenblick (A Moment)"	5:11
15.	"Tränenherz - Outro"	2:39

Tränenherz 2
No.	Title	Length
1.	"Vampire's Call"	4:45
2.	"L.I.E.B.E. (L.O.V.E.)"	5:14
3.	"Childhood"	3:59
4.	"Mera Noire"	4:37
5.	"Dein Leben (Your Life)"	4:36
6.	"Death Is Calling"	4:41
7.	"Soul in Isolation"	5:46
8.	"Cursed"	4:23
9.	"Mondnacht (Moonnight)"	5:44
10.	"Fly Away"	5:08
11.	"Why Did You?"	3:42

Signs of the Zodiac
No.	Title	Length
1.	"Aries"	2:44
2.	"Taurus"	4:35
3.	"Gemini"	3:24
4.	"Cancer"	3:22
5.	"Leo"	3:50
6.	"Virgo"	4:42
7.	"Libra"	3:24
8.	"Scorpio"	4:28
9.	"Sagittarius"	2:21
10.	"Capricorn"	6:17
11.	"Aquarius"	3:17
12.	"Pisces"	5:27

Tränenherz (25th Anniversary Edition) CD2
No.	Title	Length
1.	"Vampire's Call"	4:44
2.	"L.I.E.B.E."	5:14
3.	"Childhood"	3:58
4.	"Mera Noire"	4:37
5.	"Dein Leben"	4:35
6.	"Death is Calling"	4:41
7.	"Soul in Isolation"	5:45
8.	"Cursed"	4:23
9.	"Mondnacht"	5:44
10.	"Fly Away"	5:07
11.	"Why Did You?"	3:40
12.	"Promised Land"	5:00
13.	"A Miracle"	3:46
14.	"Insomnia"	5:39
