= Nachtbringer =

EP by Blutengel
- Released: 18 November 2011
- Genre: Futurepop; Darkwave
- Label: Out of Line

Blutengel chronology
Tränenherz (2011)	Nachtbringer (2011)	Monument (2013)

Nachtbringer is the third EP from German futurepop band Blutengel. It was released as a single CD, and limited edition CD/DVD. The DVD is a live performance from the Tränenherz Tour 2011.
To promote the EP, a music video for Nachtbringer was made.

== Track listing ==
No.	Title	Length
1.	"Nachtbringer (Nightbringer)"	4:04
2.	"Out of Control"	5:26
3.	"Time (There's Nothing More)"	3:40
4.	"Anders Sein (Being Different)"	4:43
5.	"Wir Sind Die Nacht (We Are the Night)"	4:21
6.	"Another World"	5:47
7.	"Voices"	6:24
8.	"Am Ziel (At the Finish)"	3:18
9.	"Like A Shadow (Demo 2009)"	5:22
10.	"Color of the Night (Demo 2009)"	6:24
11.	"Still Standing (Demo 2009)"	6:51
12.	"Black Roses (Live 2011)"	5:02
13.	"Reich Mir Die Hand (Live 2011) (iTunes Bonus Track)"	3:29

Limited Edition DVD: Tränenherz Live
No.	Title	Length
1.	"Intro (Live)"	2:58
2.	"The Lost Children (Live)"	4:40
3.	"Ordinary Darkness (Live)"	5:51
4.	"Doomsday (Live)"	4:56
5.	"Behind the Mirror (Live)"	3:30
6.	"Über Den Horizont (Live)"	4:23
7.	"Soul of Ice (Live)"	5:23
8.	"Lucifer (Live)"	4:53
9.	"Das Andere Ich (Live)"	3:47
10.	"Die With You (Live)"	5:00
11.	"Winter of My Life (Live)"	6:09
12.	"Vampire Romance (Live)"	5:17
13.	"Ein Augenblick (Live)"	5:18
14.	"The End (Live)"	6:12
15.	"Bloody Pleasures (Live)"	6:23
16.	"Im Nightliner"	10:45
17.	"Aftershow Berlin"	4:37
18.	"Chris Cam (Backstage)"	17:22
19.	"Seelenschmerz (Soundcheck/On Stage)"	4:50
20.	"Zugabe (On Stage)"	6:56
21.	"Vampire Romance (Fan Cam)"	4:57
22.	"Zita Rock 2011 (Backstage & Reich Mir Die Hand)"	6:00
