= Blutengel =

German electronic music group

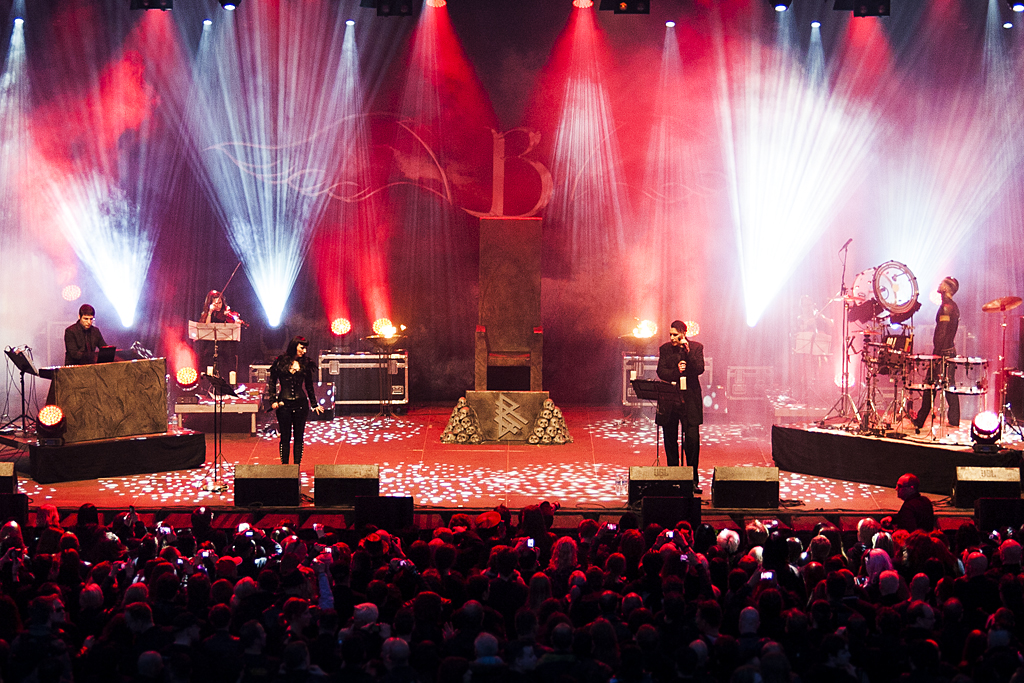
- Blutengel performing on the Blackfield Festival 2013

Background information
- Origin: Berlin, Germany
- Genres: Darkwave; futurepop; synthpop
- Years active: 1998–present
- Label: Out of Line Music
- Members: Chris Pohl; Ulrike Goldmann
- Past members: Nina Bendigkeit; Kati Roloff; Gini Martin; Eva Pölzing; Sonja Semmler; Constance Rudert; Steffi Weingarten; Anja Milow

Blutengel (German pronunciation: [ˈbluːtʔɛŋl̩]; stylized BlutEngel; German for "Blood Angel") is a German electronic music group formed by singer Chris Pohl (also of the groups Terminal Choice, Tumor and Miss Construction and the owner of the Fear Section label) after leaving Seelenkrank. The lyrics are written primarily in German and English and are presented with male and female vocals. The themes of the songs usually centre around themes common in Gothic fiction such as love, vampirism, sexual fetishism, death and immortality. The band call their musical style "dark pop".

== History ==
=== Formation and early years (1998–2001) ===
Blutengel was formed in 1998 after Chris Pohl had decided to give up the preceding project, Seelenkrank (which had released two albums), due to contractual problems. Just as its predecessor, Blutengel uses melodious electronic tunes in combination with both male and female voices. The lyrics are primarily in German or English and mixed between male and female vocals paired with electronic sounds and with songs often focusing on all aspects of love, from the tragedy of hopeless romance of vampires (all the way to the more animal aspects of desire) and aspects of death and the afterlife. Musical influences have included Ultravox, Bauhaus, Orchestral Manoeuvres in the Dark, The Cure and Depeche Mode.

The group's first album, Child of Glass, was released in early 1999 with Kati Roloff and Nina Bendigkeit as the original female vocalists.

In 2001, the second album, Seelenschmerz, was released. Bendigkeit left to concentrate on photography and eventually form the band Formalin. Gini Martin joined the band as the second female voice alongside Roloff. The first Blutengel gig ever took place at the Wave-Gotik-Treffen on 1 June 2001 in Leipzig in front of 10,000 fans. At the end of 2001, the single "Black Roses" was released with Constance Rudert as a session singer. The band performed at the Dark Storm Festival where Rudert appeared on stage with Roloff and Martin. This was the last time the band would play with its original lineup. Roloff and Martin left the band days later for personal reasons and founded their own project together, Tristesse de la Lune. Rudert, who had originally only been recruited for the single "Black Roses", became a full-time member of the band. Eva Pölzing joined soon after as a second vocalist.

=== Rise in popularity (2002–2008) ===
Angel Dust was released in 2002, placing 58th on the German charts. The Angel Dust promotional photo shoot and booklet was made by Nina Bendigkeit.

In 2004, Blutengel's fourth album, Demon Kiss, was released, featuring the single "Forever". A DVD release, Live Lines, and the album-length EP, The Oxidising Angel, appeared in 2005, the latter of which contained new material as well as a cover of "Cry Little Sister" from The Lost Boys soundtrack. In early October, Eva Pölzing left band due to other projects. She was replaced by Ulrike Goldmann (ex-Say-Y).

For the following two years, the band released a couple of singles with a slightly more "pop-driven" sound until their fifth album, Labyrinth, was released in September 2007. It reached 36th in the German charts and featured the single "Lucifer" and the live favourite "Engelsblut".

=== Extended albums (2009–2012) ===
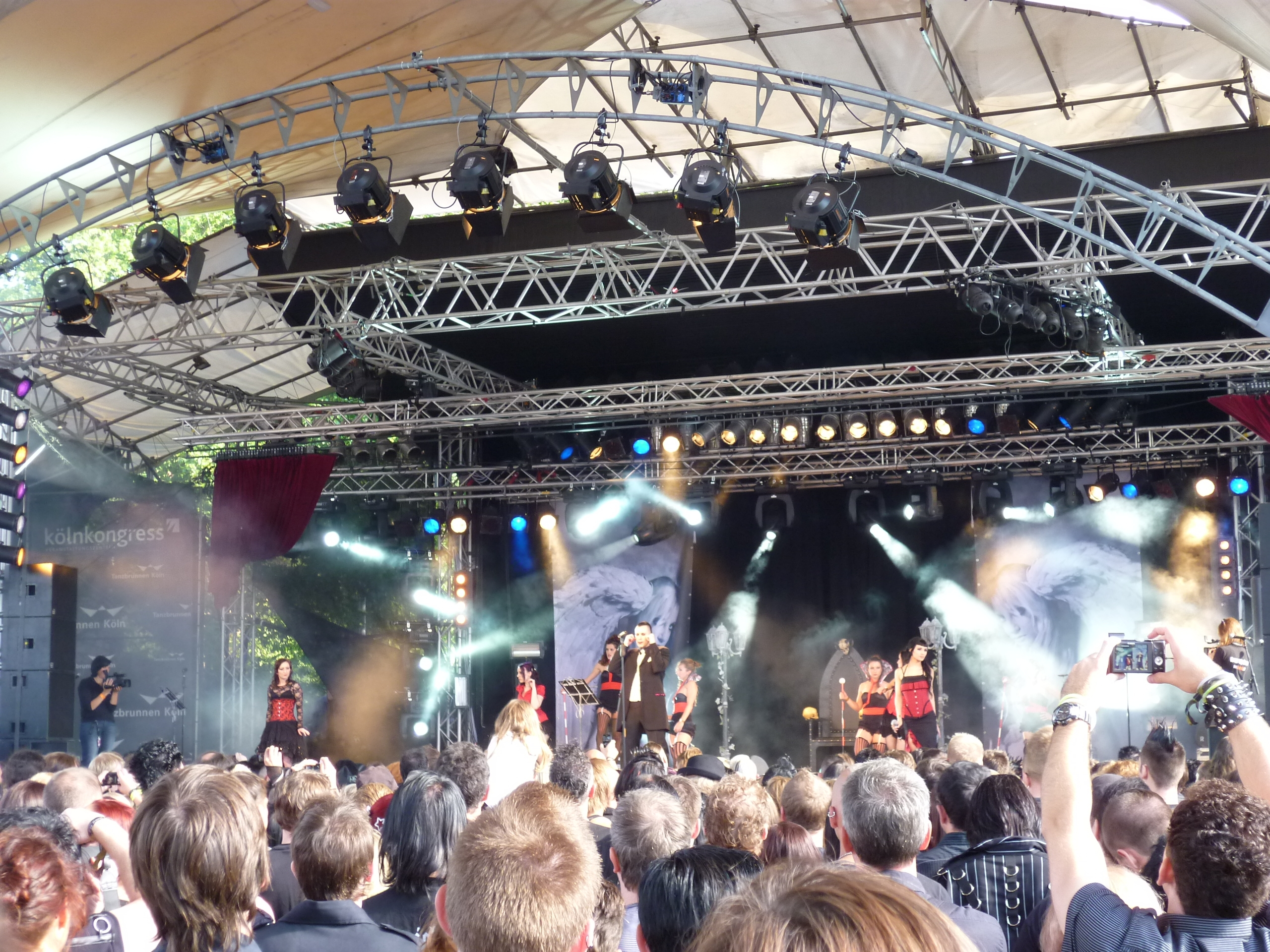
Blutengel at Amphi Festival 2010 in Cologne

In 2009, Blutengel released the album Schwarzes Eis, which featured the single "Dancing in the Light" and accompanying music video to promote the album. An extended edition of this album contained three full CDs, each with its own subtitle (Schwarzes Eis, the instrumental Behind the Mirror, and Redemption). The EP Soultaker was released later that year.

In 2010, the band performed at the Amphi Festival featuring Anja Milow, Maria Rehfeld and Jenny Haufe who had been hired in 2009 as a dancers for the Schwarzes Eis tour. Days later, it was announced on the official website that Constance Rudert had been replaced by two new singers, Anja Milow and Steffi Weingarten. Both featured on the seventh album, Tränenherz, released in 2011, and placed in the German charts at number 12. Two singles, "Über den Horizont" and "Reich mir die Hand", were released to promote the album, with accompanying music videos, the latter featuring Pohl's new girlfriend Viki Scarlet as the "Bloody Girl" in "Reich mir die Hand", who would later become a permanent dancer.

The EP Nachtbringer followed that same year. A music video was released for the title track, featuring the complete lineup excluding Haufe for this video. Weingarten was fired from the band before they began touring, and on her official Facebook page, she wrote a statement claiming that she was not allowed to tour due to legal issues with Rudert. Haufe left in 2012, followed by Milow to focus on her job as a model for the clothing label AMF Korsets, continue college studies and work as an independent designer with her label Madone Noire.

=== Monument and Black Symphonies (2012–2014) ===
From 12 to 20 May 2012, Blutengel toured North America for the first time, playing in Mexico City, New York, San Antonio, San Francisco, Los Angeles and in Montreal for the Kinetik Festival. After the tour, Maria Rehfeld left the band.

The first single from the album Monument, "Save Our Souls", was released in November 2012, while the second single, "You Walk Away", was released in January 2013. Monument was released in February 2013 and placed #4 and #96 on the German and Switzerland music charts respectively. "Kinder dieser Stadt" was released on 19 July 2013 as the third single from the album.

Blutengel released an orchestral compilation album, Black Symphonies (An Orchestral Journey), in February 2014. A single and music video for "Krieger" was released to promote the album.

=== Omen and best-of album (2014–2016) ===
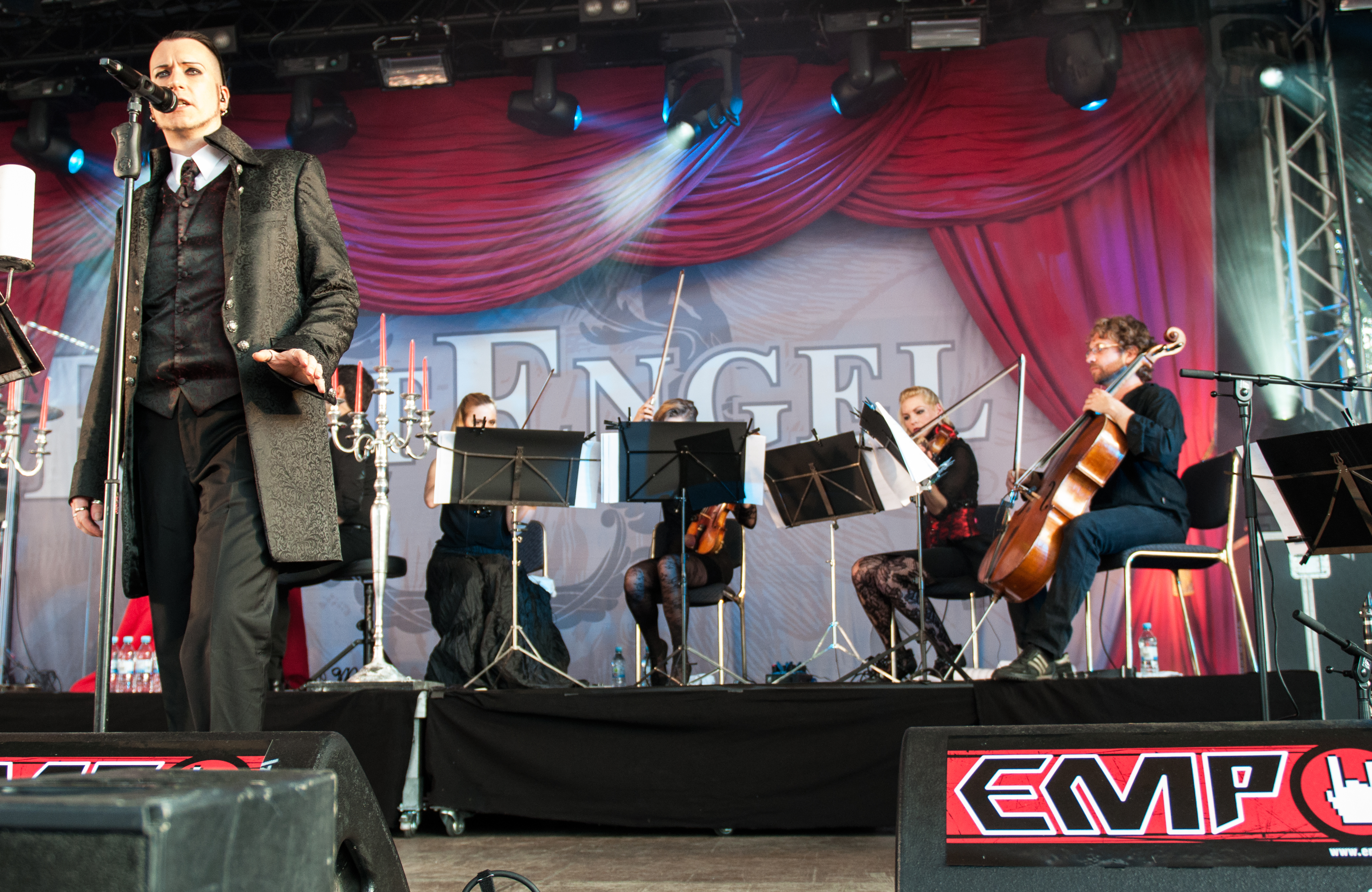
Blutengel performing in 2014

The first single, "Asche zu Asche", from their upcoming album, was released on 14 November 2014. The second single, "Sing", was released on 23 January 2015. Omen was released on 12 February 2015.

The band then embarked on the first leg of the Omen tour in April and spanning through to August. Festival appearances included Wave-Gotik-Treffen, Mera Luna Festival, and Summer Breeze Open Air.

A new EP, In alle Ewigkeit, was announced via the band's website in early August as well as the tour dates for the second leg of the Omen tour, which began in November and ended in early December. The new EP was released 23 October 2015 and featured a reworking of "Weg zu mir", originally from Child of Glass, which served as a preview for the upcoming best-of album.

On 26 February 2016, their best-of album Nemesis: The Best of & Reworked was released with re-recorded versions of Blutengel classics. To support this release, they played the Nemesis – Open Air Festival in July.

Due to legal issues, Omen was re-released under the title Save Us.

=== Leitbild and Un:Gott (2016–present) ===
In early 2016, BlutEngel entered the studio to record a new album, set for a release in February 2017. "Complete", the first single from the upcoming tenth album, Leitbild, was released on 2 December 2016; it featured two B-sides and a remix by British darkwave act Massive Ego. The second single, "Lebe deinen Traum", was released digitally on 3 February 2017.

Leitbild was released on 17 February. The album would be the band's third straight album to chart in the top 5 of the Media Control Charts at number 4. It would also chart Swiss Music Charts at number 49. Blutengel went on tour starting in April and ended in May to promote the album, with Massive Ego as their support. On 12 May, they performed an acoustic set which was recorded for release on DVD as A Special Night Out: Live & Acoustic in Berlin.

After the Leitbild tour ended, Chris teased that he began work on a new mini album or EP, to be released towards the end of the year. The mini album was later confirmed and entitled Black. The second leg of the Leitbild tour was also announced for October–December 2017. Live im Wasserschloss Klaffenbach was released April 2018, with footage from their Nemesis – Open Air Festival from July 2016.

In May 2018, Blutengel were back in the studio working on their next album, Un:Gott, which was released 15 February 2019 and was promoted with a tour that began in February. The tour was once again supported by Massive Ego.

A new mini album, Damokles, was released on 1 November 2019.

During the COVID-19 pandemic, three singles were released: The first, "Wir sind unsterblich", on 27 March; the second, "Obscured" (a collaboration with Hocico), on 3 April; the third, "Nothing but a Void" (a collaboration with Massive Ego), on Friday, 13 November.

== Line-up ==
=== Current members ===
- Chris Pohl – vocals, lyrics, programming (1998–present)
- Ulrike Goldmann – vocals and lyrics (2005–present)

=== Current dancers ===
- Viki Scarlet – main visual concept (2011–present)

=== Former members ===
- 1998–2000: Nina Bendigkeit (was in Formalin; also female voices on Seelenkrank and Terminal Choice albums) – vocals and lyrics
- 1998–2002: Kati Roloff (was in Tristesse de la Lune with Gini but left in late 2006) – vocals
- 2000–2002: Gini Martin (was in Tristesse de la Lune) – vocals and lyrics
- 2002–2005: Eva Pölzing (was in F.O.D) – vocals
- 2002–2010: Constance Rudert (was in Cinderella Effect)– session singer then vocals and visual concept
- 2010–2011: Steffi Weingarten – vocals
- 2009–2012: Anja Milow – vocals and visual concept

=== Former dancers ===
- 2001–2009: Sonja Semmler (now in Masters of Comedy) – live performance, visual concept (their first official dancer/performance artist to be part of the band)
- 2009–2012: Jenny Haufe – visual concept
- 2009–2012: Maria Rehfeld – visual concept

== Discography ==
=== Studio albums ===
- 1999: Child of Glass
- 2001: Seelenschmerz
- 2002: Angel Dust
- 2004: Demon Kiss
- 2007: Labyrinth
- 2009: Schwarzes Eis
- 2011: Tränenherz
- 2013: Monument
- 2015: Omen/Save Us
- 2017: Leitbild
- 2019: Un:Gött
- 2021: Erlösung – The Victory of Light
- 2023: Un:Sterblich – Our Souls Will Never Die
- 2025: Damonen Sturm
