= Seelenschmerz =

Studio album by Blutengel
- Released: 19 March 2001
- Length: 63:35
- Label: Out of Line and SPV Records (Germany)

Blutengel chronology
Child of Glass (1999)	Seelenschmerz (2001)	Angel Dust (2002)

Singles from Seelenschmerz
- 1. "Bloody Pleasures" Released: 27 July 2001

Seelenschmerz ("Soulache") is the second album by German band Blutengel. It was re-released in 2001 remastered as a 2 disc release, the original remastered album and a bonus disc of tracks from the original bonus disc, the Bloody Pleasures single, and a compilation track.

== Track listing ==
Seelenschmerz
No.	Title	Length
1.	"Welcome to the Suicide (Intro)"	2:52
2.	"Seelenschmerz"	5:33
3.	"I'm Dying Alone"	3:46
4.	"Der Spiegel"	3:32
5.	"Schmerz 1 – Liebe"	6:13
6.	"Die with You"	4:49
7.	"Run Away"	3:58
8.	"Soul of Ice"	4:50
9.	"Schmerz 2 – Lust"	2:59
10.	"Bloody Pleasures"	4:41
11.	"Children of the Night"	4:56
12.	"Schmerz 3 – Einsamkeit"	2:05
13.	"Any Chance?"	6:17
14.	"Road to Hell"	5:29
15.	"Schmerz 4 – Tod"	2:28
16.	"After Death (Outro)"	2:15

Limited edition bonus CD
No.	Title	Length
1.	"Fairyland (Male Version)"	4:14
2.	"Addicted"	4:54
3.	"No One (Lives Forever)"	5:25
4.	"My World"	5:41

- The female version of "Fairyland" is sung by Kati and appears on the compilation Machineries of Joy vol. 1.

2011 Remastered Edition: CD2
No.	Title	Length
1.	"Bloody Pleasures"	4:40
2.	"Bloody Pleasures (Extended Mix)"	6:20
3.	"Children of the Night (Edit)"	4:58
4.	"Children of the Night (Inscape Mix)"	4:32
5.	"Fairyland (Male Version)"	4:15
6.	"Addicted"	4:55
7.	"No One (Lives Forever)"	5:30
8.	"My World"	5:43
9.	"Fairyland"	4:12

== Info ==
- All tracks written and produced by Christian "Chris" Pohl
- Male vocals by Chris Pohl
- Female vocals on track 2, "Seelenschmerz", by Gini Martin
- Female vocals on track 3, "I'm Dying Alone", by Kati and Gini
- Female vocals on track 8, "Soul of Ice", by Kati Roloff

Bonus CD

- Male vocals by Chris Pohl
- Female vocals on track 4, "My World", by Kati Roloff
