= Monument (Blutengel album) =

Studio album by Blutengel
- Released: 15 February 2013
- Genre: Futurepop; Darkwave
- Label: Out of Line

Blutengel chronology
Nachtbringer (2011)	Monument (2013)	Once in A Lifetime (2013)

Singles from Monument
- 1. "Save Our Souls" Released: 30 November 2012; 2. "You Walk Away" Released: 25 January 2013; 3. "Kinder Dieser Stadt" Released: 19 July 2013

Monument is the eighth studio album from German futurepop band Blutengel. It was released as a single CD, 2xCD digipack with Legend as the bonus disc, and a collectors edition box set with the 2xCD album and an EP entitled Dark & Pure featuring stripped down piano versions of existing Blutengel songs, arranged and performed by Conrad Oleak. Dark & Pure is the only bonus disc that has yet to be made available through digital retailers.
Monument is the first album to spawn not only three singles, Save Our Souls, You Walk Away & Kinder Dieser Stadt, but accompanying music videos. A video to No Eternity (Piano Version) was released for promotion but did not feature any of the band.

== Track listing ==
No.	Title	Length
1.	"A New Dawn to Rise (Intro)"	1:25
2.	"You Walk Away"	3:55
3.	"Kinder dieser Stadt (Children in This City)"	3:31
4.	"All These Lies"	4:45
5.	"Tears Might Dry"	5:07
6.	"Uns gehört die Nacht (The Night is Ours)"	4:07
7.	"Die Zeit (The Time)"	5:11
8.	"When I Feel You"	4:14
9.	"Willst du? (Will You)"	4:24
10.	"Nie mehr (Never Again)"	3:50
11.	"Save Our Souls"	4:21
12.	"Deine Welt (Your World)"	3:57
13.	"Lebensrichter (Judge of Life)"	4:09
14.	"Monument"	4:04

Legend
No.	Title	Length
1.	"Legend Part 1"	0:58
2.	"A Place Called Home"	4:52
3.	"Tod_Sünde (Death_Sin)"	4:29
4.	"One Voice"	4:23
5.	"Wake Me Up"	4:35
6.	"Königin der Nacht (Queen of the Night)"	3:43
7.	"I Am"	6:04
8.	"Legend Part 2"	1:57

Dark & Pure
No.	Title	Length
1.	"No Eternity (Piano Version)"	4:00
2.	"Weine nicht um mich (Piano Version)"	5:26
3.	"Time (Piano Version)"	3:46
4.	"Save Me (Piano Version)"	4:46
5.	"Am Ziel (Piano Version)"	2:46

iTunes Bonus Tracks
No.	Title	Length
23.	"Ein neuer Tag"	4:39
24.	"You Walk Away (Music Video)"	3:55

Monument (25th Anniversary Edition) CD2
No.	Title	Length
1.	"Legend Part 1"	0:59
2.	"A Place Called Home"	4:52
3.	"Tod_Sünde"	4:30
4.	"One Voice"	4:23
5.	"Wake Me Up"	4:36
6.	"Königin Der Nacht"	3:43
7.	"I Am"	6:04
8.	"Legend Part 2"	1:57
9.	"What You Get"	4:27
10.	"Königin der Nacht (Extended Mix)"	4:57
11.	"She Tries"	4:22
12.	"Krieger"	3:52
13.	"Grey City"	5:14
14.	"A Place Called Home (Machines of Joy 5 Version)"	4:54
15.	"Ein Neuer Tag"	4:40
