= Out of Line Music =

German record label

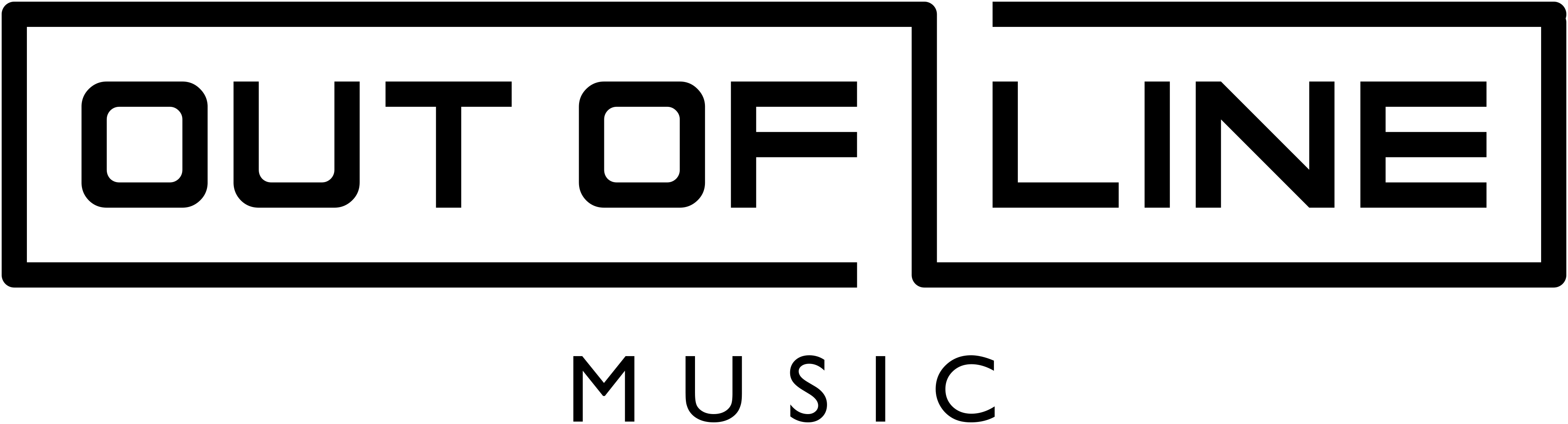
- Founded: 1995
- Founder: André Kobliha, Yvonne Diel
- Distributor: Rough Trade (Believe Digital) Ingrooves Music Group (Universal Music Group)
- Genre: Industrial metal, rock, metalcore, electronic
- Country of origin: Germany
- Location: Berlin
- Official website: outofline.de

Out of Line Music is an independent record label located in Berlin, Germany, Miami, Florida, and Las Vegas, Nevada. Out of Line is distributed by Rough Trade (Believe Digital) and exclusive partner to publishing giant BMG Rights Management, through sister company Edition Layer Cake.

== History ==
Founded in 1995 as a mail order, Out of Line quickly grew into becoming an influential label in the industry, with records from artists such as Combichrist, Blutengel, Lord of the Lost and others reaching peak positions on charts.

The label focus shifted over the past few years to signing acts from the modern rock and metal scene, announcing a handful of new signings in 2021 such as Being as an Ocean, EGGVN, Novelists, Betraying the Martyrs, ten56., Villain of the Story, Ashen and True North. Out of Line recently hired on industry veteran Nick Walters-Ocean as EVP of A&R / GM North America, who came over after his long 14 year tenure with Sumerian Records.

== Notable artists ==
- Amduscia
- And One
- Ashbury Heights
- Balance Breach
- Being as an Ocean
- Betraying the Martyrs
- Blind Channel
- Bloodred Hourglass
- Blutengel
- Cane Hill
- Client
- Combichrist
- Elwood Stray
- Emarosa
- Erdling
- Gyze
- Hocico
- Mors Subita
- Novelists
- Rabia Sorda
- Rave the Reqviem
- Signal Aout 42
- Suicide Commando
- Ten56.
- The Klinik
- Till Lindemann
