= Hot Chocolate discography =

- Studio albums: 8
- Compilation albums: 14
- Singles: 50

The discography of Hot Chocolate, a British disco and soul band.

== Studio albums ==
Title	Details	Peak chart positions					Certifications
Title	Details	UK	AUS	NL	NZ	US	Certifications
Cicero Park Emma (in Australia)	Released: June 1974; Label: Rak, Big Tree	—	73	—	—	55	
Hot Chocolate	Released: November 1975; Label: Rak, Big Tree	34	27	—	—	41	BPI: Silver
Man to Man	Released: August 1976; Label: Rak, Big Tree	32	70	—	—	172	BPI: Silver
Every 1's a Winner	Released: April 1978; Label: Rak, Infinity	30	31	14	23	31	BPI: Silver
Going Through the Motions	Released: July 1979; Label: Rak, Infinity	—	97	—	—	112	
Class	Released: November 1980; Label: Rak	—	—	—	—	—	
Mystery	Released: September 1982; Label: Rak, EMI America	24	92	28	27	—	
Love Shot	Released: October 1983; Label: Rak	—	—	41	—	—	
Strictly Dance	Released: 1993; Label: Polydor	—	—	—	—	—	
"—" denotes a recording that did not chart or was not released in that territory.

== Compilation albums ==
Title	Details	Peak chart positions				Certifications
Title	Details	UK	AUS	NL	NZ	Certifications
XIV Greatest Hits	Released: November 1976	6	62	—	—	BPI: Gold
20 Greatest Hits	Released: 1979	—	—	3	—	
20 Hottest Hits	Released: December 1979	3	—	25	10	BPI: Platinum
Hot Chocolate's Hottest Hits	Released: October 1982	—	4	—	—	AUS: Platinum
Countdown 16	Released: 1985	—	79	—	—	
The Very Best of Hot Chocolate	Released: 9 February 1987	1	—	—	22	BPI: Platinum
2001 (Note: Remix album.)	Released: 1987	—	—	—	—	
Their Greatest Hits	Released: March 1993	1	—	—	3	BPI: 2× Platinum
Platinum (The Very Best Of)	Released: October 1993	—	—	9	—	
The Most of Hot Chocolate	Released: March 1996	—	—	—	—	
Greatest Hits Part Two	Released: January 1999	—	—	—	—	BPI: Gold
Best of the 70s	Released: 2000	—	—	—	—	
Brother Louie	Released: 2002	—	—	—	—	
The Essential Collection	Released: 2004	—	—	—	—	
A's B's & Rarities	Released: 2004	—	—	—	—	
Hottest Hits (Note: Promo CD given by the Daily Mail on Sunday 25 January 2009.)	Released: 2009	—	—	—	—	
An Introduction To: Hot Chocolate	Released: 2017	—	—	—	—	
Remixes and Rarities	Released: 2020	—	—	—	—	
The RAK Singles	Released: 2021	—	—	—	—	
"—" denotes a recording that did not chart or was not released in that territory.

== Singles ==
Year	Title	Peak chart positions								Certifications (sales thresholds)	Album
Year	Title	UK	AUS	BEL	GER	IRE	NL	NZ	US	Certifications (sales thresholds)	Album
1969	"Give Peace a Chance" (as Hot Chocolate Band)	—	—	—	—	—	—	—	—		Non-album singles
1970	"Love Is Life"	6	—	—	—	13	—	—	—		Non-album singles
1971	"You Could Have Been a Lady"	22	—	—	—	—	—	—	—		Non-album singles
1971	"I Believe (In Love)"	8	—	—	—	—	—	—	—		Non-album singles
1972	"Mary-Anne"	—	—	—	—	—	—	—	—		Non-album singles
1972	"You'll Always Be a Friend"	23	—	—	—	—	—	—	—		Non-album singles
1973	"Brother Louie"	7	36	—	—	19	—	—	—		Non-album singles
1973	"Rumours"	44	—	—	—	—	—	—	—		Non-album singles
1974	"Emma"	3	6	2	19	7	2	—	8	BPI: Silver	Cicero Park
1974	"Changing World"	58 (Note: Chart position is from the official UK "Breakers List".)	—	—	—	—	—	—	—		Cicero Park
1974	"Cheri Babe"	31	68	26	—	—	10	—	—		Non-album singles
1975	"Blue Night"	—	—	—	—	—	—	—	—		Non-album singles
1975	"Disco Queen"	11	—	—	48	16	—	—	28		Cicero Park
1975	"A Child's Prayer"	7	92	—	—	6	—	—	—		Hot Chocolate
1975	"You Sexy Thing"	2	4	15	8	4	5	2	3	BPI: Platinum; RIAA: Gold	Hot Chocolate
1976	"Don't Stop It Now"	11	—	—	18	12	—	—	42		Man to Man
1976	"Man to Man"	14	—	—	13	17	—	—	—		Man to Man
1976	"Heaven Is in the Back Seat of My Cadillac"	25	32	—	28	19	—	—	—		Man to Man
1977	"So You Win Again"	1	12	6	6	2	5	8	31	BPI: Silver	Every 1's a Winner
1977	"Put Your Love in Me"	10	90	29	7	19	20	—	—	BPI: Silver	Every 1's a Winner
1978	"Every 1's a Winner"	12	12	29	14	11	10	7	6	BPI: Silver; RIAA: Gold	Every 1's a Winner
1978	"I'll Put You Together Again"	13	12	20	15	8	14	31	—	BPI: Silver	Non-album single
1979	"Mindless Boogie"	46	—	—	48	21	46	—	—		Going Through the Motions
1979	"Going Through the Motions"	53	—	—	43	—	49	33	53		Going Through the Motions
1980	"No Doubt About It"	2	56	—	3	2	9	—	—	BPI: Silver	Non-album single
1980	"Are You Getting Enough of What Makes You Happy"	17	—	—	25	15	—	—	—		Class
1980	"Love Me to Sleep"	50	—	—	42	—	—	—	—		Class
1981	"Gotta Give Up Your Love"	—	—	21	—	—	42	—	—		Class
1981	"I'm Losing You"/"Children of Spacemen"	—	—	—	—	—	—	—	—		Class
1981	"You'll Never Be So Wrong"	52	—	—	73	—	15	—	—		Mystery
1982	"Girl Crazy"	7	9	2	13	11	4	—	—		Mystery
1982	"It Started with a Kiss"	5	15	1	11	5	7	2	—	BPI: Silver	Mystery
1982	"Chances"	32	85	—	42	8	—	—	—		Mystery
1982	"Are You Getting Enough Happiness" (re-recorded version)	—	—	—	—	—	—	—	65		Mystery
1983	"What Kinda Boy You're Lookin' For (Girl)"	10	—	12	23	4	17	—	—		Non-album single
1983	"Tears on the Telephone"	37	—	6	21	22	18	—	—		Love Shot
1983	"I'm Sorry"	89	—	—	57	—	—	—	—		Love Shot
1984	"I Gave You My Heart (Didn't I)"	13	—	—	—	12	—	—	—		Love Shot
1986	"Heartache No. 9"	76	—	—	52	—	—	—	—		The Very Best of Hot Chocolate
1987	"You Sexy Thing" (Ben Liebrand Remix)	10	—	20	5	8	56	—	—		The Very Best of Hot Chocolate
1987	"Every 1's a Winner" (Groove Mix)	69	—	—	—	—	59	—	—		2001
1987	"No Doubt About It" (Tequila-Mix)	—	—	—	—	—	—	—	—		2001
1988	"Heaven Is in the Backseat of My Cadillac" (D.D. Mix)	—	—	—	—	—	—	—	—		2001
1988	"Never Pretend"	—	—	—	50	—	—	—	—		Non-album singles
1989	"What About You"	—	—	—	—	—	—	—	—		Non-album singles
1989	"Get It Right"	—	—	—	—	—	—	—	—		Non-album singles
1993	"It Started with a Kiss" (re-issue)	31	—	—	—	—	—	—	—		Non-album singles
1993	"Kiss to Mean Goodbye"	—	—	—	—	—	—	—	—		Strictly Dance
1993	"Cry Little Girl"	—	—	—	—	—	—	—	—		Strictly Dance
1997	"You Sexy Thing" (Ben Liebrand Remix; re-issue)	6	80	—	—	19	—	—	—		Non-album singles
1998	"It Started with a Kiss" (second re-issue)	18	—	—	—	—	—	—	—		Non-album singles
"—" denotes a recording that did not chart or was not released in that territory.
