= Their Greatest Hits (Hot Chocolate album) =

Greatest hits album by Hot Chocolate
- Released: 1993
- Label: EMI
- Producer: Mickie Most

Professional ratings
Review scores
Source	Rating
AllMusic	4/5 stars
Music Week	3/5 stars

Their Greatest Hits is a greatest hits album by British soul band Hot Chocolate, released in 1993 by EMI Records. The album peaked at number one on the UK Albums Chart shortly after release and returned to the top 10 of the chart again in 1997 following the success of the film The Full Monty, which includes the 1975 Hot Chocolate single "You Sexy Thing". "You Sexy Thing" was also re-released as a single in 1997, reaching number six in the UK Singles Chart.

== Track listing ==
All tracks written by Errol Brown, except where noted.

No.	Title	Writer(s)	Length
1.	"You Sexy Thing"	Brown; Tony Wilson	4:05
2.	"It Started with a Kiss"		4:02
3.	"Brother Louie"	Brown; Wilson	4:58
4.	"Girl Crazy"		3:22
5.	"So You Win Again"	Russ Ballard	4:29
6.	"Put Your Love in Me"		5:41
7.	"Love Is Life"	Brown; Wilson	3:35
8.	"I'll Put You Together Again"	Don Black; Geoff Stephens	3:52
9.	"No Doubt About It"	David Most; Steve Glen; Mike Burns	4:28
10.	"Every 1's a Winner"		4:02
11.	"Emma"	Brown; Wilson	3:53
12.	"I Gave You My Heart (Didn't I)"	Richard Gower	3:40
13.	"You Could've Been a Lady"	Brown; Wilson	3:47
14.	"Disco Queen"	Brown; Wilson	3:09
15.	"Don't Stop It Now"		2:55
16.	"A Child's Prayer"		3:51
17.	"What Kinda Boy You're Lookin' For (Girl)"		3:46
18.	"I Believe (In Love)"	Brown; Wilson	3:49
19.	"Are You Getting Enough Happiness?"		4:13

== Chart performance ==
=== Weekly charts ===
Chart (1993)	Peak position
German Albums (Offizielle Top 100)	42
New Zealand Albums (RMNZ)	3
UK Albums (OCC)	1

=== Year-end charts ===
Chart (1993)	Position
New Zealand Albums (RMNZ)	47
UK Albums (OCC)	88

== Certifications ==
Region	Certification	Certified units/sales
United Kingdom (BPI)	2× Platinum	600,000^{^}
^{^} Shipments figures based on certification alone.
