= Frances Ha (soundtrack) =

2013 soundtrack album

Frances Ha (Music from the Motion Picture)

Soundtrack album by various artists
- Released: May 28, 2013
- Length: 38:37
- Label: ABKCO

Frances Ha (Music from the Motion Picture) is the soundtrack to the 2012 film of the same title. Released through ABKCO Records on May 28, 2013, the soundtrack featured music from French musicians and composers, as well as pop hits from David Bowie, Paul McCartney and several other musicians. The soundtrack received positive reviews from critics.

== Background ==
Frances Ha's soundtrack consisted of compositions from Georges Delerue, Jean Constantin and Antoine Duhamel, who wrote music for films produced in the French New Wave. It also featured popular music, such as "Modern Love" by David Bowie, "Blue Sway" by Paul McCartney, "Every 1's a Winner" by Hot Chocolate amongst several others. "Modern Love" is featured in a sequence where Frances runs through the streets—the sequence is inspired by the similar scene from Mauvais Sang (1986) directed by Leos Carax. This song was also featured in the film's first promotional trailer. According to Baumbach, the structure and rhythm of the script essentially led him to provide the scope for the musical moments, where the film had little moments and then a sequence will play out after the end of it. He found the music to be "strong, grand, romantic and joyous".

== Reception ==
Frances Ha's soundtrack was critically acclaimed. El Hunt of Evening Standard attributed that "there's a hell of a lot of great music crammed into this black and white indie comedy". Oliver Lyletton of IndieWire called the soundtrack to be "amazing", complementing Baumbach's use of music.

The use of the songs "Every 1's a Winner" and "Modern Love", led it to be listed in the best musical moments of 2013, according to The Hollywood Reporter and Stereogum. Paste included the film's soundtrack as "one of the best film soundtracks of 2013". MovieWeb and /Film and listed Frances Ha as one among the best film soundtracks of the 2010s. Pitchfork ranked the soundtrack at number 29 on the 50 greatest film soundtracks of all time.

== Track listing ==
Frances Ha (Music from the Motion Picture) track listing
No.	Title	Artist(s)	Length
1.	"Camille"	Georges Delerue	3:27
2.	"Chrome Sitar"	T. Rex	3:16
3.	"King Of Hearts La Pavane Polka"	Georges Delerue	2:38
4.	"L'Ecole Buissoniere"	Jean Constantin	2:08
5.	"Blue Sway"	Paul McCartney	4:35
6.	"Domicile Conjugal"	Antoine Duhamel	1:33
7.	"Modern Love"	David Bowie	4:47
8.	"Million Dollar Doll"	Dean & Britta	5:18
9.	"Every 1's a Winner"	Hot Chocolate	3:56
10.	"Miss Butter's Lament"	Harry Nilsson	2:21
11.	"Negresco's Waltz"	Georges Delerue	2:55
12.	"King of Hearts Le Repos"	Georges Delerue	1:43
Total length:			38:37
