= It Started with a Kiss (song) =

- 7" vinyl single cover

Single by Hot Chocolate

from the album Mystery
- B-side: "Emotion Explosion"
- Released: 1982
- Genre: Soul, pop
- Length: 4:00
- Label: RAK, EMI Electrola
- Songwriter: Errol Brown

Hot Chocolate singles chronology
"Girl Crazy" (1982)	"It Started with a Kiss" (1982)	"Chances" (1982)

"It Started with a Kiss" is a 1982 song by Hot Chocolate, from their seventh studio album Mystery. It reached number 5 in the UK, making it their fifth-highest-charting single.

The song is sung from the perspective of a young man who has been in love with a young woman since they kissed as pre-teens. Now, when they are older, she no longer remembers him.

The Guardian's Mick Brown wrote that the single's appearance in the top 10 'confirms the resurrection of Hot Chocolate to their rightful place in the British charts'.

== Track listings ==
=== 1982 release ===
7" single (worldwide) / 12" single (DE)

No.	Title	Writer(s)	Length
1.	"It Started with a Kiss"	Errol Brown	4:00
2.	"Emotion Explosion"	Errol Brown	4:03

=== 1993 re-release ===
UK 7" single / cassette

No.	Title	Writer(s)	Length
1.	"It Started with a Kiss"	Errol Brown	4:00
2.	"You Sexy Thing"	Errol Brown, Tony Wilson	3:42

UK CD maxi-single (Part 1)

No.	Title	Writer(s)	Length
1.	"It Started with a Kiss"	Errol Brown	4:00
2.	"You Sexy Thing"	Errol Brown, Tony Wilson	3:42
3.	"Every 1's a Winner"	Errol Brown	3:55

UK CD maxi-single (Part 2)

No.	Title	Writer(s)	Length
1.	"It Started with a Kiss"	Errol Brown	4:00
2.	"Medley" ("Emma" / "So You Win Again" / "You Sexy Thing" / "Every 1's a Winner" / "You Could Have Been a Lady")	Errol Brown, Tony Wilson, Russ Ballard	6:49
3.	"Emma"	Errol Brown, Tony Wilson	3:46

=== 1998 re-release (Hot Chocolate featuring Errol Brown) ===
UK CD maxi-single / cassette

No.	Title	Writer(s)	Length
1.	"It Started with a Kiss"	Errol Brown	4:00
2.	"Heavens Is in the Back Seat of My Cadillac"	Errol Brown	3:55
3.	"You Sexy Thing"	Errol Brown, Tony Wilson	3:42

== Album appearances ==
Year	Track No.	Album
1982	6	Mystery
1987	1	The Very Best of Hot Chocolate
1987	5	2001
1993	2	Their Greatest Hits
1996	1	The Most of Hot Chocolate
1996	10	Premium Gold Collection
1999	1	Greatest Hits Part Two (1977–1987)
2009	2	Hottest Hits
2012	20 (overall) 1 (on CD 2)	You Sexy Thing: The Best of Hot Chocolate

The song was re-released as a single in 1993 and 1998.

== Charts ==
=== Original 1982 release ===
Chart (1982)	Peak position
Australia (ARIA)	15
Austria (Ö3 Austria Top 40)	18
Belgium (Ultratop)	1
Germany (GfK Entertainment)	11
Ireland (Irish Singles Chart)	5
Netherlands (Dutch Top 40)	7
New Zealand (Official New Zealand Music Chart)	2
United Kingdom (UK Singles Chart)	5

=== Re-releases ===
Year of re-release	Peak position (UK)
1993	31
1998	18

== Certifications ==
Region	Certification	Certified units/sales
New Zealand (RMNZ)	Gold	15,000^{‡}
United Kingdom (BPI)	Silver	250,000^{^}
^{^} Shipments figures based on certification alone.^{‡} Sales+streaming figures based on certification alone.
