= Cicero Park =

Studio album by Hot Chocolate
- Released: June 1974
- Studio: Morgan, London
- Genre: Soul
- Length: 40:38 (UK): 42:34 (international); 96:43 (with bonus CD)
- Label: RAK, Big Tree (US)
- Producer: Mickie Most

Hot Chocolate chronology
Cicero Park (1974)	Hot Chocolate (1975)

Singles from Cicero Park
- 1. "Emma" Released: 25 February 1974; 2. "Changing World" Released: May 1974; 3. "Disco Queen" Released: 25 April 1975

Cicero Park is the debut album by British soul band Hot Chocolate. It was released in June 1974 on the RAK Records label, owned by Mickie Most, who was the band's producer. The album peaked at number fifty-five on the US Billboard 200 album chart.

The original 1974 LP release comprised ten original songs by the band's writing team, lead vocalist Errol Brown and bassist Tony Wilson. The album included the group's first major international hit, "Emma" and "Disco Queen". Cicero Park did not contain the song "Brother Louie", which had been a 1973 US hit for the American band Stories, though the song replaced "Bump And Dilly Down" on US, Canada, Japan, and New Zealand editions of the album. The Hot Chocolate version of "Brother Louie" was later issued on CD as part of the 2009 Cicero Park bonus disc.

The album was issued on CD for the first time in an expanded 25-track 2-disc set in 2009.

== Reception ==
Professional ratings
Review scores
Source	Rating
AllMusic	2/5 stars
Christgau's Record Guide	B+

Cicero Park has received varying reviews from contemporary critics.

In his obituary of Errol Brown in The Independent, Spencer Leigh praised the LP for its lyrical content:

"Although Hot Chocolate are known as a singles band, they should be commended for their 1974 album Cicero Park, which touched on issues of race and class. Many credit The Real Thing as being the first British band to do this, but Hot Chocolate's album pre-dates 4 from 8 by three years."

Alex Henderson writing for AllMusic gave the album a mixed review. Citing that Hot Chocolate's albums including Cicero Park tended to be mildly uneven, but more often than not, the material [on Cicero Park] is quite promising. Henderson praises the title track, the Curtis Mayfield-influenced "Could Have Been Born in the Ghetto", the funky "Disco Queen" but singles out "Emma" [as] a real treasure, although a depressing one.

== Track listing ==
All tracks written by Errol Brown and Tony Wilson; except where indicated.

=== 1974 LP issue ===
Side one

1. "Cicero Park" – 4:41
2. "Could Have Been Born in the Ghetto" (Theme from Love Head) – 5:50
3. "A Love Like Yours" – 3:29
4. "You're a Natural High" – 3:08
5. "Emma" – 3:52

Side two

1. "Changing World" – 4:31
2. "Disco Queen" – 3:35
3. "Makin' Music" – 3:45
4. "Funky Rock 'n' Roll" – 4:48
5. "Bump and Dilly Down" – 2:59

=== 1974 US, Canada, Japan, and New Zealand issues ===
Side one

1. "Cicero Park" – 4:43
2. "Could Have Been Born in the Ghetto" (Theme from Love Head) – 5:50
3. "A Love Like Yours" – 3:30
4. "You're a Natural High" – 3:07
5. "Emma" – 3:51

Side two

1. "Changing World" – 4:30
2. "Disco Queen" – 3:30
3. "Makin' Music" – 3:44
4. "Funky Rock 'n' Roll" – 4:52
5. "Brother Louie" – 4:57

=== 2009 bonus disc ===
1. "Love Is Life" – 3:39
2. "Pretty Girls" – 2:26
3. "You Could've Been a Lady" – 3:41
4. "Everybody's Laughing" – 3:10
5. "I Believe in Love" – 3:53
6. "Caveman Billy" – 4:02
7. "Mary Anne" – 3:54
8. "Ruth" (Joe Chambers) – 4:02
9. "You'll Always Be a Friend" – 3:29
10. "Go Go Girl" – 3:49
11. "Brother Louie" – 4:59
12. "I Want to Be Free" – 2:51
13. "Rumours" – 4:32
14. "A Man Needs a Woman" – 3:56
15. "Makin' Music" (Single Version) – 3:51

== Personnel ==
Hot Chocolate

- Errol Brown – lead vocals
- Harvey Hinsley – guitar, backing vocals
- Larry Ferguson – keyboards
- Tony Wilson – bass, vocals, backing vocals
- Tony Connor – drums
- Patrick Olive – percussion, backing vocals

Production

- Mickie Most – producer (all tracks except bonus disc 2, 9, 10, 14)
- Errol Brown and Tony Wilson – producer (bonus disc 2, 9, 10, 14)
- Chris Foster – photography

== Charts ==
Chart performance for Cicero Park
Chart (1974)	Peak position
Australian Albums (Kent Music Report)	73
