= Every 1's a Winner =

1978 album by British band Hot Chocolate

Studio album by Hot Chocolate
- Released: April 1978
- Studios: RAK, London
- Genres: Soul; pop; R&B; rock
- Length: 39:19; 56:22 (with bonus tracks)
- Labels: RAK, Infinity (US)
- Producer: Mickie Most

Hot Chocolate chronology
| Man to Man (1976) | Every 1's a Winner (1978) | Going Through the Motions (1979) |

Singles from Every 1's a Winner
- 1. "So You Win Again" Released: June 1977; 2. "Put Your Love in Me" Released: November 1977; 3. "Every 1's a Winner" Released: February 1978

Every 1's a Winner is the fourth studio album by British band Hot Chocolate. It was released in April 1978 on the RAK Records label in the UK and the Infinity Records label in the U.S. The album peaked at number 30 on the UK Albums Chart and number 31 on the US Billboard 200.

The original release included nine songs. "So You Win Again", the album's first single, was the band's first number-one single in the UK and charted at number 31 in the US. The second single, "Put Your Love in Me", reached number 10 in the UK but failed to chart in the US. The title track and third single reached number six in the US, making it the band's second-highest-charting single in the US behind "You Sexy Thing", and number 12 in the UK. The album sold more than a million copies in the U.S.

The album was re-released on CD in 2009, with five bonus tracks.

== Production ==
The title track was inspired by noises made by Errol Brown's baby daughter. It was originally going to be a tribute to her, before Brown decided to change the lyrics to describe a romantic relationship between adults.

== Critical reception ==
Professional ratings
Review scores
| Source | Rating |
|---|---|
| Christgau's Record Guide | B |
| The Encyclopedia of Popular Music | 3/5 stars |

The Los Angeles Times determined that, "in its best moments, the Chocolate ... mixes the sensuality and tension of Al Green soul music with the firmness and punch of a Boz Scaggs rocker."

== Track listing ==
Side one

1. "Every 1's a Winner" – 4:49
2. "Confetti Day" – 4:39
3. "Love Is the Answer One More Time" – 2:57
4. "Sometimes It Hurts to Be a Friend" – 5:24

Side two

1. "So You Win Again" (Russ Ballard) – 4:31
2. "Stay with Me" (Tony Connor, Harvey Hinsley, Patrick Olive) – 4:07
3. "Run Away Girl" – 3:25
4. "I'm Going to Make You Feel Like a Woman" – 3:41
5. "Put Your Love in Me" – 5:46

CD bonus tracks (2009)

10. "A Part of Being with You" – 2:56
11. "Let Them Be the Judge" – 3:26
12. "The Power of Love" (Connor, Hinsley, Olive) – 3:19
13. "I'll Put You Together Again" – 3:52
14. "West End of Park Lane" – 3:30

== Personnel ==
Hot Chocolate

- Errol Brown – lead vocals
- Harvey Hinsley – guitars, backing vocals
- Larry Ferguson – keyboards, Moog synthesizer
- Patrick Olive – bass guitar, backing vocals
- Tony Connor – drums
- Chanter Sisters – backing vocals

Production

- Mickie Most – producer
- Phil Hendriks – liner notes

== Charts ==
Chart performance for Every 1's a Winner
| Chart (1978) | Peak position |
|---|---|
| Australian Albums (Kent Music Report) | 31 |
| Austrian Albums (Ö3 Austria) | 15 |
| Canada Top Albums/CDs (RPM) | 20 |
| Dutch Albums (Album Top 100) | 14 |
| German Albums (Offizielle Top 100) | 27 |
| New Zealand Albums (RMNZ) | 23 |
| Norwegian Albums (VG-lista) | 16 |
| Swedish Albums (Sverigetopplistan) | 30 |
| UK Albums (OCC) | 30 |
| US Billboard 200 | 31 |

== Certifications ==
Certifications for Every 1's a Winner
| Region | Certification | Certified units/sales |
|---|---|---|
| United Kingdom (BPI) | Silver | 60,000^{^} |
^{^} Shipments figures based on certification alone.
