= Bootsauce =

Canadian rock band

- Bootsauce, 1991 (From left: Al Baculis, Pere Fume, Sonny Greenwich Jr., Drew Ling)

Background information
- Origin: Montreal, Quebec, Canada
- Genres: Funk rock
- Years active: 1989–1996
- Labels: Next Plateau Entertainment, Island Records, PolyGram, Vertigo Records
- Members: Drew Ling; Pere Fume; Sonny Greenwich Jr. Alan Baculis; John "Fatboy" Lalley; Rob Kazenel (Live Drums, 1989-90); Marc Villeneuve (Live Drums, 1990-91); Fraser Runciman (Guitar, 1994-96)

Bootsauce was a Canadian rock band based in Montreal. The band was composed of Drew Ling (real name Drew Thorpe) (vocals), Pere Fume (real name Perry Johnson) (guitar), Sonny Greenwich Jr. (guitar), Alan Baculis (bass guitar), and John "Fatboy" Lalley (drums). Their style combined soul, funk and metal sounds. Two of their albums, The Brown Album and Bull achieved Gold status in Canada. Their style was sometimes compared favorably to the Red Hot Chili Peppers.

== History ==
Bootsauce was founded in 1989 in Montreal. The band was nominated for a Juno Award as Most Promising Group in 1991, and received a Juno in 1992 for their 1991 single "Everyone's a Winner", a Hot Chocolate cover. Their songs were played on MuchMusic.

In 1992, Bootsauce was part of the cross-Canada Big, Bad & Groovy tour organized by MCA Concerts, along with Art Bergman. That year they released an album, Bull on the band's own label. In 1993, the band released the album Sleeping Bootie. The song "Sorry Whole" was released as a single and reached #1 on the RPM Cancon chart. Touring for the Sleeping Bootie album, Bootsauce played the Commodore Ballroom in Vancouver for the first time on February 4, 1994.

== Reunion Rumours ==
Greenwich mentioned on the Toronto Mike'd podcast that there was talk of a potential Bootsauce reunion tour in the early 2020s to celebrate the 30th anniversary of Bull but there ultimately wasn't enough interest to make the tour happen.

== Discography ==
Albums

- The Brown Album (1990), Next Plateau Records
- Bull (1992), Island Records
- Sleeping Bootie (1993), Vertigo Records
- Bootsauce (1995), Polygram
- Bootism: The Bootsauce Collection (1996), Vertigo Records

EPs

- ReBoot (1991, EP), Polygram
- Bum Steer (1992, EP), Polygram
- Byfleet & New Haw (1995, EP), Polygram

Singles

- "Masterstroke" (1990)
- "Scratching the Whole" (1990)
- "Play with Me" (1990)
- "Sex Marine" (1991)
- "Everyone's a Winner" (1991)
- "Love Monkey #9" (1992)
- "Whatcha Need" (1992)
- "Big, Bad & Groovy" (1992)
- "Rollercoaster's Child" (1992)
- "Touching Cloth" (1992)
- "Dogpound" (1992)
- "Sorry Whole" (1993)
- "Automatic" (1993)
- "Moanie" (1994)
- "Crack of Dawn" (1994)
- "Caught Looking at You" (1994)
- "Hey Baby" (1995)
- "Each Morning After" (1995)
- "Payment Time" (1996)

== Awards ==
- Bootsauce was nominated as Most Promising Group at the Juno Awards of 1991. At the same ceremony, John W. Stewart was nominated for Best Album Design for The Brown Album.
- At the Juno Awards of 1992, "Everyone's a Winner" won the Juno Award for Best Dance Recording.
- At the Juno Awards of 1992, John W. Stewart was nominated for Best Album Design for Bull.
- At the Juno Awards of 1996, David Andoff, Paul van Dongen, and Tara McVicar were nominated for Best Album Design for Bootsauce.
