= Everybody's Laughing =

Everybody's Laughing may refer to:

- "Everybody's Laughing" (Alex Lloyd song), 2002
- "Everybody's Laughing" (Phil Fearon & Galaxy song), 1984
- "Everybody's Laughing", a song by Hot Chocolate, B-side to "You Could Have Been a Lady", later on the 2009 reissue of Cicero Park
- "Everybody's Laughing", a song by The Esquires, B-side to "And Get Away", from the album Get on Up and Get Away
- "Everybody's Laughing", a song by Thunder from Shooting at the Sun
