= The Brown Album (Bootsauce album) =

Studio album by Bootsauce
- Released: 1990
- Genre: Funk rock
- Length: 40:48
- Label: PolyGram
- Producers: Corky Laing and Bootsauce (as "the Fudge Brothers"), Michael Jonzun

Bootsauce chronology
The Brown Album (1990)	Re-Boot (1991)

Singles from The Brown Album
- 1. "Scratching the Whole" Released: 1990; 2. "Play With Me" Released: 1990; 3. "Masterstroke" Released: 1991; 4. "Everyone's a Winner" Released: 1991

Professional ratings
Review scores
Source	Rating
AllMusic	2/5 stars

The Brown Album is the debut album by Canadian band Bootsauce. It was released in 1990 on PolyGram Records and spawned four singles, the last of which, their cover of Hot Chocolate's "Everyone's a Winner", became the band's biggest hit. In 1991, the album was certified Gold in Canada by the CRIA, having sold over 40,000 copies.

== Production ==
The Brown Album was recorded at Lac-Chat Studios in Saint-Sauveur, Quebec in late 1989. It was produced by the band themselves under the pseudonym "The Fudge Brothers," along with former Mountain drummer Corky Laing. The album was recorded over the course of six weeks, during which time what was originally intended to be an EP evolved into a full-length album. Additional production was done at Hudson Studios in Westchester, New York and the album was mastered by Howie Weinberg at Masterdisk in New York City. Michael Jonzun co-produced the fifth track, "Everyone's a Winner," with Laing and the band.

== Musical and lyrical style ==
The Brown Album laid the groundwork for Bootsauce's trademark musical style, which was an eclectic fusion of genres that include garage rock, heavy metal, funk, rap, and jazz. The album also introduced other elements that would prove to be distinctive band trademarks, such as lyrics rife with sexual innuendo (as evidenced by many of the song titles); their fondness for toilet humor (note the final two syllables in "Catastrophe Seas"); and their heavy use of sampling from a diverse range of sources (from old R&B records to movie dialogue) for flavor.

== Album cover and design ==
The album was packaged in an attention-grabbing, bright orange sleeve. The cover, designed and created by internationally acclaimed, Montreal-based artist J.W. Stewart, features the outline of a blindfolded giant filled with the photographed heads of the band members and their friends. The interior features individual photos of the band members (minus Alan Baculis) standing shirtless before a black backdrop, with images of graffiti-filled brick walls projected onto them.

On the vinyl pressing of the album, Side A is listed as "Eh," and Side B is listed as "Huh." On the cassette, there is no reference as to which side is which; each side of the cassette features the album in its entirety.

== Track listing ==
All tracks are written by Bootsauce, except "Everyone's a Winner" by Errol Brown.

No.	Title	Length
1.	"Let's Eat Out"	3:57
2.	"Scratching the Whole"	3:24
3.	"Sex Marine"	4:48
4.	"Catastrophe Seas"	4:11
5.	"Everyone's a Winner"	4:50
6.	"Play with Me"	4:26
7.	"Lovin' Pain"	3:08
8.	"Payment Time"	3:55
9.	"Catcher in the Raw"	4:11
10.	"Masterstroke"	3:59
Total length:		40:48

== Personnel ==
Bootsauce

- Drew Ling - lead vocals, electroblending
- Pere Fume - guitars, keyboards, lead vocals on "Sex Marine"
- Sonny Greenwich, Jr. - guitars
- Alan Baculis (as Baculis) - bass

Additional musicians

- Rob Kazanel - live drums

Production personnel

- Bootsauce (as "The Fudge Brothers") & Corky Laing - producers
- Mike Scott - engineer, co-producer
- Michael Jonzun - producer (with "The Fudge Brothers" & Corky Laing) on "Everyone's a Winner"
- Phil Greene - engineer on "Everyone's a Winner"
- Howie Weinberg - mastering
- Chris Muth - assistant engineer

Additional personnel

- J.W. Stewart - cover concept and artwork
- Vicki Fekete - conceptual photos
- Eve Damie - conceptual art
