= T-Shirt (pop duo) =

English pop duo

- Origin: England
- Genres: Pop
- Years active: 1996–1997
- Labels: Eternal; WEA
- Past members: Miranda Cooper; Chloé Treend

T-Shirt were a short-lived English pop duo which consisted of songwriter Miranda Cooper and actress Chloé Treend. They released one single in 1997; a cover of the Hot Chocolate song "You Sexy Thing". This and the version by Clock were released at almost the same time as the 1997 re-issue of the Hot Chocolate original.

"You Sexy Thing" was a success, reaching number five in New Zealand, number six in Australia, number 10 in Belgium (Ultratip) and number 63 in the United Kingdom. In Australia and New Zealand, the single earned platinum certifications.
