= The April Wine Collection =

Greatest hits album by April Wine
- Released: 1992
- Genre: Rock
- Length: 67:20, 68:56, 66:20, 66:31
- Label: Aquarius
- Producer: See various producers

April Wine chronology
Oowatanite (1990)	The April Wine Collection (1992)	Attitude (1993)

Professional ratings
Review scores
Source	Rating
Allmusic	4.5/5 stars

The April Wine Collection is a compilation album by the Canadian rock band April Wine, released in 1992. This album has the biggest selection of songs on one album by April Wine, and is still in print.

== Vol 1 – The Singles ==
All tracks written by Myles Goodwyn unless otherwise noted.

1. "Fast Train" – 3:20
2. "You Could Have Been a Lady" (Errol Brown, Tony Wilson) – 3:20
3. "Bad Side of the Moon" (Elton John, Bernie Taupin) – 3:14
4. "Drop Your Guns" (D. Henman) – 3:35
5. "Lady Run, Lady Hide" (M. Goodwyn, J. Clench) – 2:59
6. "I'm on Fire for You Baby" (David Elliott) – 3:26
7. "I Wouldn't Want to Lose Your Love" – 3:09
8. "Tonite Is a Wonderful Time to Fall in Love" – 3:36
9. "Like a Lover, Like a Song" – 5:07
10. "The Whole World's Goin' Crazy" – 2:42
11. "You Won't Dance With Me" – 3:42
12. "Roller" – 3:36
13. "Rock n' Roll Is a Vicious Game" – 3:16
14. "Say Hello" – 3:00
15. "Just Between You and Me" – 3:55
16. "Sign of the Gypsy Queen" (Lorence Hud) – 4:16
17. "Enough Is Enough" – 4:04
18. "This Could Be the Right One" – 4:07
19. "Rock Myself to Sleep" (Kimberley Rew, Vince de la Cruz) – 2:56

== Vol 2 – The Rock Songs ==
1. "Anything You Want, You Got It" – 4:44
2. "I Like to Rock" – 4:27
3. "Before the Dawn" (B. Greenway) – 4:20
4. "All Over Town" – 2:58
5. "Hot on the Wheels of Love" (M. Goodwyn, S. Lang) – 3:12
6. "Tonite" – 4:13
7. "Future Tense" – 4:09
8. "21st Century Schizoid Man" (R. Fripp, M. Giles, G. Lake, I. McDonald, P. Sinfield) – 6:25
9. "Crash and Burn" – 2:36
10. "Oowatanite" (J. Clench) – 3:50
11. "Don't Push Me Around" – 3:13
12. "Get Ready for Love" – 4:13
13. "Tellin' Me Lies" – 3:03
14. "Blood Money" – 5:23
15. "Gimme Love" (M. Goodwyn, Hovaness "Johnny" Hagopian) – 3:58
16. "Weeping Widow" (Robert Wright, AKA. Art La King) – 3:53
17. "Victim for Your Love" – 4:19

== Vol 3 – Vintage Wine ==
1. "Cum Hear the Band" – 3:52
2. "Slow Poke" – 3:45
3. "Wings of Love" – 4:52
4. "Mama Laye" – 4:17
5. "Marjorie" – 3:45
6. "Child's Garden" – 4:39
7. "Lovin' You" – 3:35
8. "It's a Pleasure to See You Again" – 2:47
9. "Comin' Right Down on Top of Me" – 4:08
10. "What If We Fall in Love" – 4:16
11. "Tell Me Why" (John Lennon, Paul McCartney) – 3:15
12. "Doin' It Right" (Tom Lavin) – 3:36
13. "Sons of the Pioneers" – 5:35
14. "Love Has Remembered Me" – 4:07
15. "Hold On" – 3:53
16. "Electric Jewels" (M. Goodwyn, J. Clench) – 5:58

== Vol 4 – Live ==
1. "Anything You Want" – 4:10
2. "I Like to Rock" – 3:59
3. "All Over Town" – 3:30
4. "Just Between You and Me" – 4:01
5. "Enough Is Enough" – 4:05
6. "This Could Be the Right One" – 4:51
7. "Sign of the Gypsy Queen" (Lorence Hud) – 4:25
8. "Like a Lover, Like a Song" – 5:06
9. "Comin' Right Down on Top of Me" – 1:10
10. "Rock n' Roll Is a Vicious Game" – 4:00
11. "Roller" – 4:39
12. "Don't Push Me Around" – 6:08
13. "You Could Have Been a Lady" (Errol Brown, Tony Wilson) – 3:50
14. "(Mama) It's True" (M. Goodwyn, J. Clench) – 5:05
15. "Just Like That" (M. Goodwyn, J. Clench) – 6:32

== Personnel ==
- Myles Goodwyn – lead & background vocals, guitar, keyboards
- Jim Henman – vocals, bass, acoustic guitar
- Jim Clench – vocals, bass
- Steve Lang – bass, background vocals
- Jean Pellerin – bass (on "Rock Myself to Sleep" and "Love Has Remembered Me")
- Ritchie Henman – percussion, keyboards
- Jerry Mercer – drums & percussion, background vocals
- Marty Simon – drums (on "Rock Myself to Sleep" and "Love Has Remembered Me")
- David Henman – guitar, vocals, sitar
- Gary Moffet – guitar, vocals
- Brian Greenway – guitar, vocals, harmonica
- Daniel Barbe – keyboards (on "Rock Myself to Sleep" and "Love Has Remembered Me")

=== Various producers ===
- Bill Hill – producer
- Ralph Murphy – producer
- Doug Morris – producer
- Gene Cornish – producer
- Dino Danelli – producer
- Myles Goodwyn – producer
- Nick Blagona – producer
- Mike Stone – producer
- Lance Quinn – producer
- Eddie Kramer – producer
