= Brown Album (disambiguation) =

Brown Album is a 1997 album by Primus.

Brown Album may also refer to:

- The Brown Album (Bootsauce album), 1990
- The Brown Album (Martin/Molloy album), 1995
- Brown (Chris Brown album), 2026
- The Band (album) or The Brown Album, a 1969 album by The Band
- Orbital (1993 album) or The Brown Album, an album by Orbital
- The Brown Album, the original 1970 release of Jesus Christ Superstar
