= Julie Felix =

American musician (1938–2020)

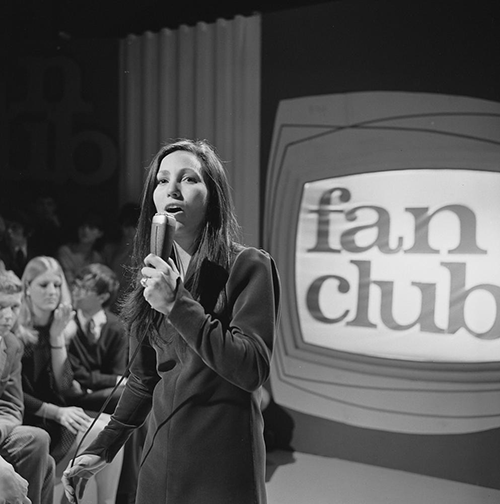
- Felix performing for Dutch television in 1967

Background information
- Born: June 14, 1938; Santa Barbara, California, U.S.
- Died: March 22, 2020 (aged 81)
- Genres: Folk music, folk rock
- Occupations: Singer, guitarist, songwriter
- Instruments: Vocals, guitar
- Years active: 1963–2020
- Labels: Decca, Fontana, RAK, EMI, Scranta, Remarkable (own label)

Julie Ann Felix (June 14, 1938 – March 22, 2020) was an American-British folk singer and recording artist who achieved success, particularly on British television, in the late 1960s and early 1970s. She later performed and released albums on her own record label.

== Early life and education ==
Felix was born in Santa Barbara, California, to a father of Mexican origin and mother of English and Welsh ancestry. Both her parents claimed Native American ancestry. She graduated in 1956 from high school in Westchester, Los Angeles.

== Career ==
Felix grew up in a musical household: her father was a professional mariachi musician, and her mother was an amateur singer who loved the music of Burl Ives. Her father taught her to play ukulele and then guitar, and she wrote her first song at the age of seven.

After studying speech and drama at the University of California, Santa Barbara, Felix worked as a sports mistress at a school for disabled children. She began her music career by singing at night in coffee shops in her native Los Angeles, where she met a young David Crosby.

After saving up $1000 from her job, she left the United States in June 1962 and travelled extensively around Europe for around two years, often playing in bars and coffee shops to earn extra money. It was during her stay on the Greek island of Hydra that she met Leonard Cohen, who at this time had become part of the 'salon' that formed around expatriate Australian writers George Johnston and Charmian Clift.

She arrived in the United Kingdom in 1964, and became the first solo folk performer signed to a major British record label when she gained a recording contract with Decca Records, for whom she recorded three solo albums. Her first major break was a headlining appearance at the Fairfield Halls in Croydon in 1965, and later that year her first solo show gave her the distinction of being the first folksinger to fill the Royal Albert Hall, and she was described by The Times as "Britain's First Lady of Folk". Her first major break in British television was an appearance on the Eamonn Andrews TV show, which was so well-received that she was invited back to perform again the following week. Felix was also the first pop musician ever to perform at Westminster Abbey.

In 1966, on the way to the launch party for her debut album, Felix had a chance meeting with comedian David Frost in the elevator of her Chelsea apartment building. Frost – who had recently been chosen as the host of a new BBC topical satire series – accompanied Felix to the launch, and was so impressed by her performance that he lobbied the BBC to include her as one of the two resident musical performers on his new BBC television programme The Frost Report (the other being American musical satirist Tom Lehrer). Her appearances on the series brought her international recognition and made her a household name in the UK.

In 1966, following the end of her deal with Decca, Felix signed a new contract with Fontana Records, a subsidiary of the Dutch-based Philips label. She made six albums for Fontana between 1966 and 1969. Her first Fontana LP, Changes, was a UK Top 40 hit, reaching no. 27, and the label also released two "tie-in" EPs of songs Felix performed on The Frost Report.

In 1967, with strong support from Frost (with whom she had a long-running romantic relationship), Felix was hired to host and perform in her own musical variety shows on BBC2, which ran from 1967 to 1970.

Felix made two consecutive musical-variety shows for the BBC, both directed and produced by Stanley Dorfman. The first was Once More With Felix. The premiere episode was transmitted on December 9, 1967. It was the first BBC TV series made in colour, and one of the first British shows of that genre to be hosted by a female pop performer. (Dusty Springfield's show Dusty, also produced and directed by Dorfman, had premiered 18 months earlier, in June 1966).

In an interview promoting her 80th birthday concert in 2018, Felix recalled that the BBC gave her one of the first colour televisions in Britain at the time, and she recounted how her Chelsea flat was "packed" with friends and guests who came to watch the Boxing Day 1967 premiere broadcast of The Beatles' Magical Mystery Tour on her colour TV.

Many notable musical guests featured on Once More with Felix and its successor The Julie Felix Show, including Manfred Mann, Dusty Springfield, Billy Preston, The Kinks, Tim Buckley, The Hollies, The Incredible String Band, Fleetwood Mac, and The Four Tops, as well as comedians Peter Cook and Spike Milligan. She invited her old friend Leonard Cohen to appear in 1968, marking his British TV debut, and Led Zeppelin lead guitarist Jimmy Page gave a rare solo performance, playing "White Summer" and "Black Mountain Side".

Felix also regularly performed with her guests; surviving segments from the show include her duetting with Cohen, singing and playing guitar with The Incredible String Band on their song "Paintbox" and singing the Tom Paxton song "Going to the Zoo", backed by The Hollies. The BBC subsequently wiped most of the master tapes of her shows, and only selected excerpts survive, which vary greatly in quality. Some of these can be viewed on YouTube.

On May 1, 1967, Felix appeared on the German TV show Beat-Club, and in September 1968 at the International Essen Song Days. She performed at the Isle of Wight Festival in 1969.

In 1968, Felix was caught in possession of cannabis at Heathrow Airport, en route to Amsterdam. She was arrested, charged, and remanded on bail, and her public image suffered somewhat, although her TV show remained on the air. She was defended in court by John Mortimer, QC.

In 1971, Felix travelled to New Zealand and performed at the Western Springs music festival. On 19 December that year she gave birth to her only child, a daughter, Tanit Alexandra Teresa Guadalupe, choosing to raise the child herself as a single mother. Felix would not discuss her child's father and never revealed his identity.

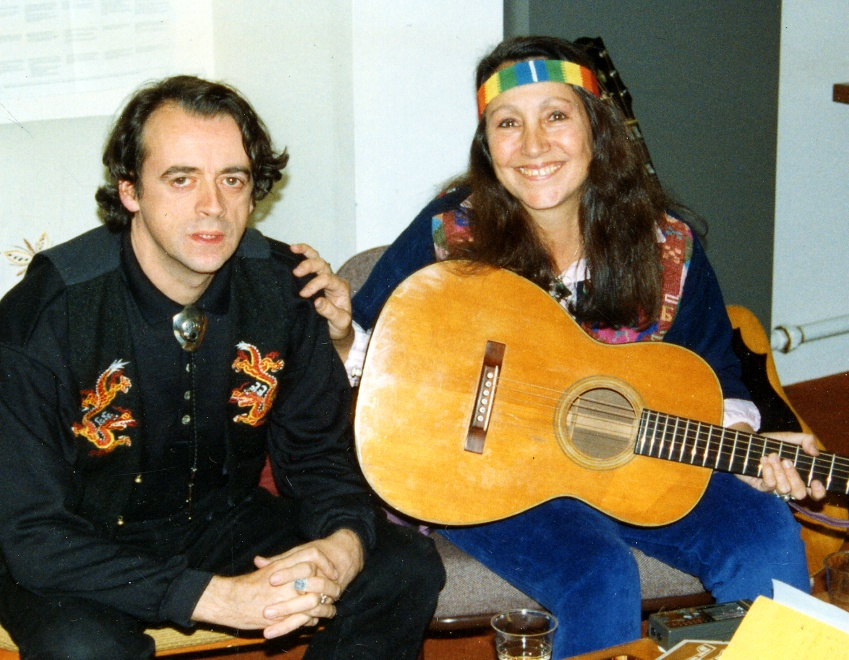
Felix with Bill Lewis prior to a joint performance in 1983

She had two UK Singles Chart hits in 1970, the first of several on the RAK label, produced by Mickie Most. The first was with the song titled "If I Could (El Cóndor Pasa)", while the second, "Heaven Is Here", was written by Errol Brown and Tony Wilson of Hot Chocolate.

== Later life and death ==
Felix released 14 albums on various labels between 1972 and 2018; many were released by her own label, Remarkable Records, including the 1989 album Bright Shadows.

Felix relocated to Norway for several years in the late 1970s, but she grew disenchanted with the direction her career was taking and returned to her native California, where she took a break from music to study yoga and other spiritual practices. She resumed performing in the late 1980s, and returned to the UK, where she resided for the rest of her life.

Social activism and charity work played a large role in Felix's life and career, and she performed on behalf of or was an activist for many causes.

On March 24, 2008, she appeared on a BBC Four programme in which stars of The Frost Report gathered for a night celebrating the 40th anniversary of Frost Over England; Felix sang "Blowin' in the Wind". She appeared at the Wynd Theatre, Melrose, Scottish Borders, on an annual basis in the 2000s.

After her return to the UK, Felix lived in Chorleywood, Hertfordshire, England until her death, still recording and performing.

Her 75th birthday in 2013 was marked by a concert at the Leicester Square Theatre. In 2018, she celebrated her 80th birthday with a special concert at the Charing Cross Theatre, which featured guest appearances by John Paul Jones, singer Madeline Bell and composer-arranger-musician John Cameron (famed for his collaborations with Donovan and Hot Chocolate).

Julie Felix died on March 22, 2020, after a short illness.

== Discography ==
=== Albums ===
- 1964 Julie Felix (Decca) including version of "Deportee (Plane Wreck at Los Gatos)"
- 1965 2nd Album (Decca)
- 1966 3rd Album (Decca)
- 1966 Changes (Fontana) – UK No. 27
- 1967 In Concert (World)
- 1967 Flowers (Fontana)
- 1968 This World Goes Round and Round (Fontana)
- 1968 Julie Felix's World (Fontana)
- 1969 Going to the Zoo (Fontana)
- 1972 Clotho's Web (RAK)
- 1974 Lightning (EMI)
- 1977 Hota Chocolata (Monte Rosa)
- 1980 Colours in the Rain (Scranta)
- 1982 Blowing in the Wind (Scranta/Dingle's)
- 1987 Amazing Grace (Starburst)
- 1989 Bright Shadows (Remarkable)
- 1993 Branches in the Mist (Remarkable)
- 1995 Windy Morning (Remarkable)
- 1998 Fire – My Spirit (Remarkable)
- 2002 Starry Eyed and Laughing: Songs by Bob Dylan (Remarkable)
- 2008 Highway of Diamonds (Remarkable)
- 2013 La Que Sabe (She Who Knows) (Remarkable)
- 2013 In The Spotlight (juliefelix.com)
- 2018 Rock Me Goddess (Talking Elephant)

=== EPs ===
- 1965 Sings Dylan & Guthrie (Decca)
- 1966 Songs from the Frost Report (Fontana)
- 1967 Songs from the Frost Report, Vol. 2 (Fontana)

=== Singles ===
- 1965 "Someday Soon" (Decca)
- 1966 "I Can't Touch the Sun" (Fontana)
- 1967 "Saturday Night" (Fontana)
- 1967 "The Magic of the Playground" (Fontana)
- 1968 "That's No Way to Say Goodbye" (Fontana)
- 1970 "If I Could (El Cóndor Pasa)" (RAK) – UK No. 19
- 1970 "Heaven Is Here" (RAK) – UK No. 22
- 1971 "Snakeskin" (RAK)
- 1971 "Moonlight" (RAK)
- 1972 "Fire Water Earth and Air" (RAK)
- 1974 "Lady With the Braid" (EMI)
- 1974 "Finally Getting to Know One Another" (EMI)
- 1974 "I Dreamed I Saw St. Augustine" (EMI)
- 1977 "Hota Chocolata" (Talent)
- 1978 "Come Out" (Talent)
- 1981 "Yoke (We Believe)" (Scranta)
- 1981 "Dance With Me" (Scranta)
- 1988 "The Sea and the Sky" (Remarkable)
- 1992 "Woman" (Remarkable)
