= It Started with a Kiss =

It Started with a Kiss may refer to:

- It Started with a Kiss (TV series), 2005 Taiwanese television series
- It Started with a Kiss (film), 1959 film starring Glenn Ford and Debbie Reynolds
- "It Started with a Kiss" (song), 1982 hit single by Hot Chocolate
