= Tears on the Telephone =

"Tears on the Telephone" may refer to:

- "Le téléphone pleure", a hit single by Claude François, rerecord in English as "Tears on the Telephone" in 1975
- "Tears on the Telephone", a 1983 hit single by Hot Chocolate
