= About Time 2 =

Studio album by Clock
- Released: 1997
- Genre: Dance-pop; Eurodance; house
- Label: MCA Records
- Producer: Stu Allan

Clock chronology
It's Time... (1995)	About Time 2 (1997)	Boogie Sound (1999)

Professional ratings
Review scores
Source	Rating
Music Week	3/5 stars

About Time 2 is the second album by British pop/dance act Clock. It was released in 1997 and features their hits "Oh What a Night" and "It's Over". The album peaked at number 56 on the UK Albums Chart.

== Track listing ==
1. "Oh What a Night" – 3:28
2. "It's Over" – 3:23
3. "Whoomph! (There It Is!)" – 3:35
4. "Everybody" – 3:38
5. "You Get Me Love" (Rap Version) – 3:50
6. "Axel F" – 3:24
7. "Everybody Jump Around" – 3:19
8. "Fly Away" – 3:26
9. "C'Mon Everybody" – 3:13
10. "Don't Go Away" – 3:22
11. "September" – 3:40
12. "The Finest" – 4:19
13. "On the Beach" – 4:55
14. "Holding On 4 U" (Visa Radio Mix) – 3:51
15. "Gave You My Love" – 3:28
16. "The Lonely Snowman" – 3:51
