= Hot Chocolate (album) =

Studio album by Hot Chocolate
- Released: November 1975
- Studios: Chateau du Regard, Coye la Forêt, Oise, France (by the RAK Records Mobile); Morgan, London
- Genres: Pop; funk; R&B
- Length: 40:08; 61:24 (with bonus tracks)
- Labels: RAK, Big Tree (US)
- Producer: Mickie Most

Hot Chocolate chronology
Cicero Park (1974)	Hot Chocolate (1975)	Man to Man (1976)

Singles from Hot Chocolate
- 1. "A Child's Prayer" Released: July 1975; 2. "You Sexy Thing" Released: October 1975

Professional ratings
Review scores
Source	Rating
AllMusic	4/5 stars
Christgau's Record Guide	B+

Hot Chocolate is the second studio album by British soul band Hot Chocolate. It was released in November 1975 on the RAK Records label, owned by Mickie Most, who was the band's producer. The album peaked at number thirty-four on the UK Albums Chart and forty-one on the US Billboard 200 album chart.

The original 1975 LP release comprised ten original songs, of which only one ("You Sexy Thing") was credited to the band's writing team, lead vocalist Errol Brown and bassist Tony Wilson. Brown and Wilson wrote rest of the album separately, with the band members Harvey Hinsley, Patrick Olive and Tony Connor contributing "A Warm Smile". The album includes the group's best-known hit, "You Sexy Thing" and the top-10 UK and Irish hit "A Child's Prayer".

The album was issued on CD for the first time with six bonus tracks in 2009.

== Track listing ==
All tracks written and composed by Errol Brown; except where indicated.

Side one

1. "Hello America" – 3:25
2. "The Street" – 5:09
3. "Call the Police" (Tony Wilson) – 3:59
4. "Dollar Sign" – 2:58
5. "You Sexy Thing" (Brown, Wilson) – 4:05

Side two

1. "A Child's Prayer" – 3:52
2. "A Warm Smile" (Harvey Hinsley, Patrick Olive, Tony Connor) – 5:24
3. "Amazing Skin Song" – 4:05
4. "Love's Coming on Strong" (Wilson) – 3:42
5. "Lay Me Down" (Wilson) – 3:29

CD bonus tracks (2009)

1. "Cheri Babe" – 2:52
2. "Sexy Lady" (Brown, Wilson) – 3:20
3. "Blue Night" – 4:02
4. "You Sexy Thing" (B-side version) (Brown, Wilson) – 4:01
5. "Everything Should Be Funky" (Wilson) – 3:06
6. "You Sexy Thing" (single version) (Brown, Wilson) – 4:04

== Personnel ==
Hot Chocolate

- Errol Brown – lead vocals
- Harvey Hinsley – lead and acoustic guitars, backing vocals
- Larry Ferguson – keyboards
- Tony Wilson – bass guitar, vocals
- Tony Connor – drums, backing vocals, electric piano
- Patrick Olive – percussion, backing vocals, bass guitar

Additional

- The CCS Horns – 2 trumpets, 1 trombone, alto, baritone and tenor saxophones
- Mickie Most – producer
- John Cameron – arrangements (1 to 3, 5, 7 to 16)
- Phil Dennys – arrangements (4, 6)
- P. Linard & Co. – album art

== Charts ==
Chart performance for Hot Chocolate
Chart (1975)	Peak position
Australian Albums (Kent Music Report)	27
Canada Top Albums/CDs (RPM)	76
UK Albums (OCC)	34
US Billboard 200	41

== Certifications ==
Certifications for Hot Chocolate
Region	Certification	Certified units/sales
United Kingdom (BPI)	Silver	60,000^{^}
^{^} Shipments figures based on certification alone.
