= Stu Allan =

British DJ (1962–2022)

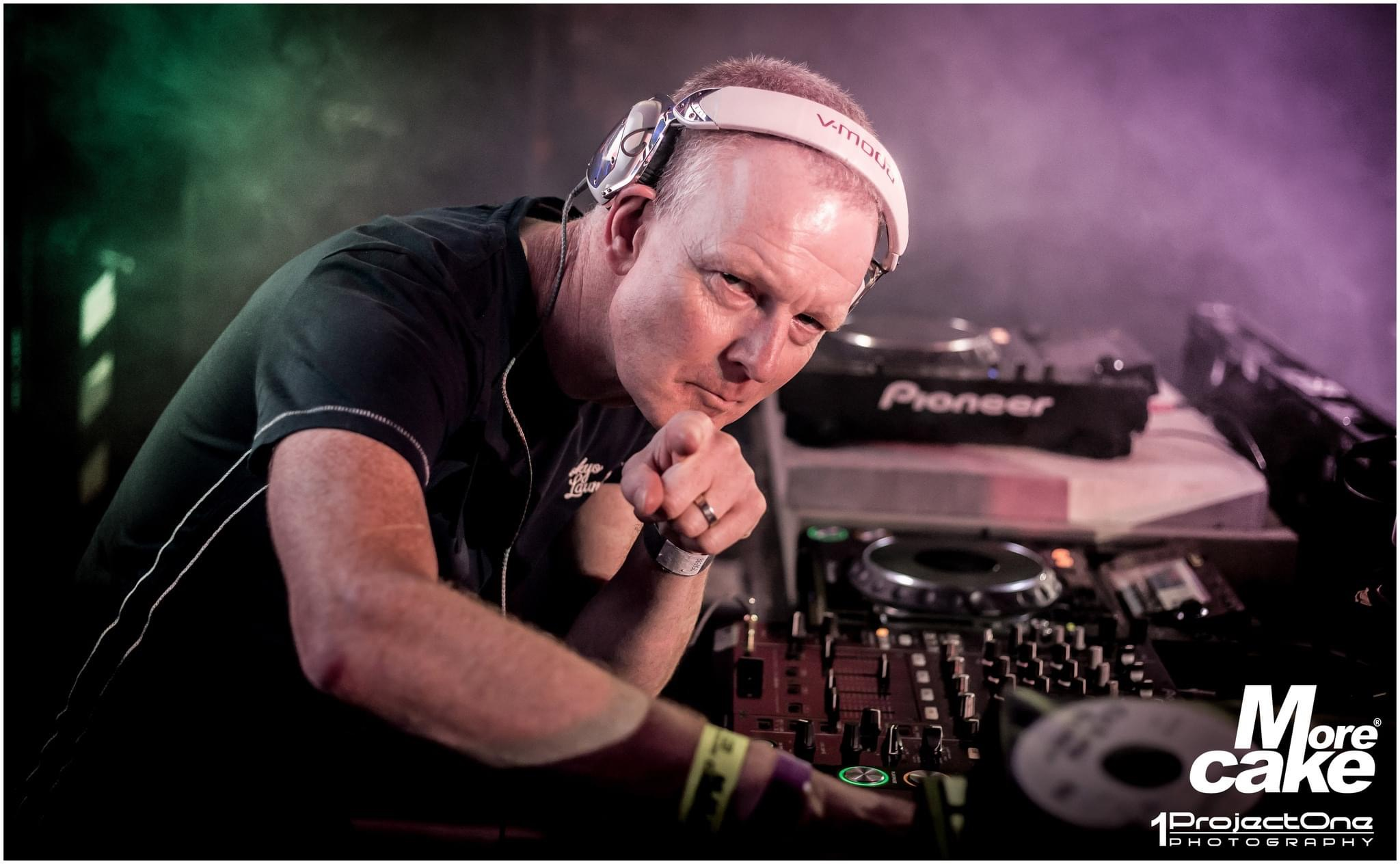

Background information
- Also known as: Visa, 150 Volts
- Born: 6 February 1962; Anglesey, Wales
- Died: 22 September 2022 (aged 60)
- Genre: UK hardcore
- Occupations: Disc jockey, record producer
- Years active: 1982–2022
- Website: stuallan.com (defunct)

Stu Allan (6 February 1962 – 22 September 2022) was a British dance music DJ and producer who worked for Piccadilly Radio and Key 103 in Manchester in the 1980s and 1990s. His hip hop, hardcore techno and house music mixes ranked him the world's No. 3 DJ by DJ Magazine in 1993.

== Biography ==
Born and raised in Anglesey, Wales, he moved to Manchester in 1982 and took up DJing. Between 1984 and 1986, his mixes/remixes were featured on Piccadilly Radio, Manchester on various shows including Timmy Mallet, Chris Evans, and Tim Grundy.

In July 1986, he was given his own show on Piccadilly Radio. He was originally filling in for the regular DJ on a 6-week holiday, but listener response led to him being signed on permanently. He began featuring hip-hop and house music. "Love Can't Turn Around" by Farley Jackmaster Funk was the first record Allan played on the radio. This track got the attention of the people in charge of the station and Allan was asked to explain why he was playing this "music". He said he believed this was what listeners really wanted to hear (having seen clubbers going wild to tunes like "Jack Your Body", "Jack the Groove" and many other underground Chicago label tunes at his gigs), and convinced them that his choice of music was right when the station's ratings improved. During this period, Allan produced a soul show called "Souled Out" and a hip-hop show called "Bus 'Diss". He also had a house music hour featuring continuous mixes.

Allan was a regular DJ at Bowlers in Trafford Park, Manchester. He was known for playing high-energy, old school music on the rave scene in the 1990s. His name was frequently misspelled as "Stu Allen" on promotional materials. Allan was also a regular DJ on the Vibelite rave scene, performing at many of their events across the north of England.

Allan was known for his mix compilation albums, including the Hardcore Adrenaline series with DJ Seduction, the first volume of which reached number 2 on the UK Compilation Chart in 2007. Volumes 2 and 3 peaked at number 6 and number 27 respectively.

In 2012 he met his future wife Alison Lloyd, who he then proposed to 9 months later. They married in Stu's birthplace of Anglesey.

Allan joined Manchester radio station Unity Radio in September 2012.

Allan died on 22 September 2022 from gastrointestinal cancer, at the age of 60. Tributes were paid from across the music scene, including from Robbie Williams. A memorial at Bowlers was held on 25 November 2022 attended by fans and fellow DJs. An annual festival in his name has been held since 2023.

== Clock ==
Between 1993 and 1999, he was one half of the production team behind Eurodance act Clock. As well as having commercial success in the group, their songs were also released as hardcore remixes under the pseudonym Visa and were hits on the underground.

== Compilation albums ==
- Hardcore Nation (2005)
- Hardcore Nation 2 (2005)
- Hardcore Nation 3 (2006)
- Hardcore Nation Classic (2007)
- Hardcore Adrenaline (2007)
- Hardcore Adrenaline 2 (2007)
- Hardcore Adrenaline 3 (2007)
- Hardcore Nation (2009)
