= Unity Radio =

- Manchester; England
- Frequencies: 92.8 MHz and DAB

Programming
- Format: House, techno, soul, drum and bass, reggae, hip hop

History
- First air date: 2001 (as a pirate); 10 December 2010 (Community radio licence)

Links
- Website: unityradio.fm

Unity Radio is a Manchester-based radio station that broadcasts on FM, DAB and online playing dance music and urban music. It first broadcast in 2001 as a pirate radio station from Moss Side until gaining a license in 2008 and commencing legal broadcasting in 2010.

In 2017, the station moved to new studios in Salford MediaCity.

The DJ and producer Stu Allan had a show on Unity.
