= Going Through the Motions (album) =

1979 album by British band Hot Chocolate

Studio album by Hot Chocolate
- Released: July 1979
- Studios: RAK, London
- Genres: Soul, Funk, R&B
- Length: 41:44
- Labels: RAK, Infinity (US)
- Producer: Mickie Most

Hot Chocolate chronology
Every 1's a Winner (1978)	Going Through the Motions (1979)	20 Greatest Hits (1979)

Singles from Going Through the Motions
- 1. "Mindless Boogie" Released: July 1979; 2. "Going Through the Motions" Released: April 1979

Professional ratings
Review scores
Source	Rating
AllMusic	3.5/5 stars
Christgau's Record Guide	B+

Going Through the Motions is the fifth studio album by British R&B and Soul band Hot Chocolate, released in July 1979 through the label RAK Records and Infinity Records.

== Track listing ==
No.	Title	Writer(s)	Length
1.	"Going Through the Motions"	Errol Brown	5:46
2.	"I Just Love What You're Doing"	Errol Brown, Harvey Hinsley, Patrick Olive, Tony Connor	6:36
3.	"Dreaming of You"	Errol Brown	5:21
4.	"Dance (Get Down to It)"	Errol Brown, Patrick Olive, Tony Connor	4:43
5.	"Mindless Boogie"	Errol Brown	8:55
6.	"Night Ride"	Errol Brown, Patrick Olive, Tony Connor	6:07
7.	"Congas Man"	Errol Brown, Harvey Hinsley, Larry Ferguson, Patrick Olive, Tony Connor	4:16
Total length:			41:44

== Personnel ==
Hot Chocolate

- Errol Brown – lead vocals
- Harvey Hinsley – guitars, backing vocals
- Larry Ferguson – keyboards
- Patrick Olive – bass guitar, backing vocals
- Tony Connor – drums, keyboards
- Derek Lewis - Percussion, Backing Vocals

Production

- Mickie Most – producer

== Charts ==
Chart (1976)	Peak position
Australia Kent Music Report	97
US Billboard 200	112
