= Bull (album) =

Studio album by Bootsauce
- Released: 1992
- Label: Vertigo/PolyGram
- Producers: Michael Jonzun, Bootsauce

Bootsauce chronology
Re-Boot (1991)	Bull (1992)	Sleeping Bootie (1993)

Bull is the second album by the Canadian band Bootsauce, released on February 7, 1992, on Polygram. It achieved Gold status in Canada in five weeks. "Love Monkey #9", "Whatcha' Need" and "Big, Bad & Groovy" were released as singles. The album was nominated for a Juno Award, in the "Best Album Design" category. It is their first album with their permanent drummer John Lalley.

== Production ==
The album was produced by Michael Jonzun and the band. Bootsauce shared in the songwriting. "Love Monkey #9" is about animal testing on non-human primates. "Big Bad & Groovy" employs a horn section. Lemmy sang on "Hold Tight".

== Reception ==
Professional ratings
Review scores
Source	Rating
AllMusic	2/5 stars
Calgary Herald	B
Windsor Star	A

RPM listed Bull as their No. 1 album to watch, on February 29 1992. The album had reached No. 9 in Canada's Top 10 selling albums by the first week of March 1992. The Ottawa Citizen reviewed it as their "top release". The Gazette noted that "there is more of everything—sex, danceability, power chords, smooth balladry, samples, with singer Drew Ling's insinuating voice living up to its owner's name." The Globe and Mail wrote: "Bootsauce bounds all over the musical map, mulching early Pink Floyd sci-fi rock with Public Enemy-styled rapping ('Touching Cloth'), emulating Extreme on the ballad 'What Cha' Need', resurrecting Dr. John on the New Orleans-styled 'Dog Pound', and paying tribute to Sly and the Family Stone." The album peaked at No. 17 on C95 FM's Top 30 Countdown in April 1992. The Edmonton Journal determined that "assertive hard rock lays the foundation for snippets of soul falsetto, New Orleans gumbo and busy, Frank Zappa-ish orchestration."

"Love Monkey #9" was the album's highest-charting single. It peaked at No. 42 on the RPM100 Hit Tracks for three weeks in March 1992, spending a total of 12 weeks on the chart. "Watcha' Need" was on the RPM100 for seven weeks, peaking at No. 51 for two weeks in June. "Big, Bad & Groovy" charted for five weeks, peaking at No. 65 for two weeks in September. The album peaked at No. 22, charting for 23 weeks from February to August.

== Track listing ==
All songs were written by Bootsauce, except where noted.

1. "Love Monkey #9" – 3:25
2. "Touching Cloth" – 3:42
3. "Whatcha' Need" – 5:09
4. "Big Bad & Groovy" – 4:08
5. "Dogpound" – 3:35
6. "Outhouse Quake" – 4:23
7. "The 13th Psalm" – 4:30
8. "Misunderstood" – 3:46
9. "Rollercoaster's Child" (Willy Beck, Leroy Bonner, Marshall Jones, Pierce, Clarence Satchel, James Williams) – 3:31
10. "I Saw You There" – 4:04
11. "The Whole of You" – 4:01
12. "Bad Dinner" – 3:45
13. "Hold Tight" – 4:15

== Personnel ==
- Drew Ling (vocals)
- Pere Fume (guitar)
- Sonny Greenwich, Jr. (guitar)
- Alan Baculis (bass, lead vocals on Track 3)
- John Lalley (as Johnny Frappe) (drums)
- Lemmy (guest vocals on Track 13)
