= Man to Man (album) =

Studio album by Hot Chocolate
- Released: August 1976
- Studio: Chateau du Regard, Coye la Forêt, Oise, France; Morgan, London
- Genre: Funk
- Length: 38:07; 44:52 (with bonus tracks)
- Label: RAK, Big Tree (US)
- Producer: Mickie Most

Hot Chocolate chronology
Hot Chocolate (1975)	Man to Man (1976)	Every 1's a Winner (1978)

Singles from Man to Man
- 1. "Don't Stop It Now" Released: March 1976; 2. "Man to Man" Released: June 1976; 3. "Heaven Is in the Back Seat of My Cadillac" Released: August 1976

Professional ratings
Review scores
Source	Rating
AllMusic	3/5 stars
Christgau's Record Guide	A−

Man to Man is the third studio album by British soul band Hot Chocolate. It was released in August 1976 on the RAK Records label, owned by Mickie Most, who was the band's producer. The album peaked at number thirty-two on the UK Albums Chart and one-hundred and seventy-two on the US Billboard 200 album chart.

The original 1976 LP release comprised nine original songs, of which only one, the re-recorded "You Could Have Been a Lady", was credited to the band's original writing team, lead vocalist Errol Brown and bassist Tony Wilson. Wilson had left the group following the band's second studio album. Brown wrote the majority of the album separately, with the band members Harvey Hinsley, Patrick Olive and Tony Connor contributing two songs. The album did not spawn any major hits in the UK or US, although "Don't Stop It Now" and the title track made the UK top twenty.

The album's re-recording of Hot Chocolate's 1971 hit single, "You Could Have Been a Lady", boasts a fuller, heavier production than the original. A 3:48 edit of the re-recording has appeared on many compilation albums issued by the band.

The album was issued on CD for the first time with two bonus tracks in 2009.

== Track listing ==
All tracks written and composed by Errol Brown; except where indicated.

Side one

1. "Heaven Is in the Back Seat of My Cadillac" – 5:10
2. "Living on a Shoe String" – 4:19
3. "Sugar Daddy" – 5:29
4. "Man to Man" – 4:22

Side two

5. "You Could've Been a Lady" (Brown, Tony Wilson) – 3:48; 4:25 on some releases
6. "Sex Appeal" (Harvey Hinsley, Patrick Olive, Tony Connor) – 4:01
7. "Harry" (Hinsley, Olive, Connor) – 4:00
8. "Don't Stop It Now" – 3:02
9. "Seventeen Years of Age" – 3:56

CD bonus tracks (2009)

10. "Beautiful Lady" (Hinsley, Olive, Connor) – 2:48
11. "Eyes of a Growing Child" (Hinsley, Olive, Connor) – 3:57

== Personnel ==
Hot Chocolate

- Errol Brown – lead vocals
- Harvey Hinsley – guitars
- Larry Ferguson – keyboards
- Patrick Olive – bass guitar, backing vocals
- Tony Connor – drums

Production

- Mickie Most – producer
- Doug Hopkins – engineer
- John Cameron – arrangements
- Gered Mankowitz – photography

== Charts ==
Chart performance for Man to Man
Chart (1976)	Peak position
Australian Albums (Kent Music Report)	70
German Albums (Offizielle Top 100)	32
Norwegian Albums (VG-lista)	17
UK Albums (OCC)	32
US Billboard 200	172

== Certifications ==
Certifications for Man to Man
Region	Certification	Certified units/sales
United Kingdom (BPI)	Silver	60,000^{^}
^{^} Shipments figures based on certification alone.
