= No Doubt About It (Hot Chocolate song) =

- 7" vinyl single cover

Single by Hot Chocolate
- Released: May 1980
- Genre: Pop
- Length: 4:25
- Label: RAK
- Songwriter(s): Mike Burns, Steve Glen, David Most
- Producer(s): Mickie Most

Hot Chocolate singles chronology
"Going Through the Motions" (1979)	"No Doubt About It" (1980)	"Are You Getting Enough of What Makes You Happy" (1980)

Music video
- "No Doubt About It" (TopPop, 1980) on YouTube

"No Doubt About It" is a May 1980 single by the British pop group Hot Chocolate. Its lyrics recount the experiences of a man who witnesses a UFO landing.

The single was released on RAK label under the catalogue reference RAK 310 and was the band's highest-charting hit of the 1980s, peaking at number 2 and spending 11 weeks on the UK Singles Chart.

The song was written by Mike Burns, Steve Glen and David Most (the brother of the band's manager, Mickie Most). It was remixed by Frank Mono and released as a single for a second time in 1988.

== Track listing ==
=== 1980 release ===
7" vinyl / 12" vinyl

1. "No Doubt About It" (David Most, Mike Burns, Steve Glen) – 4:25
2. "Gimme Some Of Your Loving" (Harvey Hinsley, Patrick Olive, Tony Connor) – 3:37

=== 1988 remix ===
7" vinyl

1. "No Doubt About It (Little Tequila Mix)" (David Most, Mike Burns, Steve Glen) – 3:51
2. "I Gave You My Heart (Didn't I)" (Richard Gower) – 3:39

12" vinyl

1. "No Doubt About It (Tequila Mix)" (David Most, Mike Burns, Steve Glen) – 6:44
2. "No Doubt About It (Little Tequila Mix)" (David Most, Mike Burns, Steve Glen) – 3:51
3. "I Gave You My Heart (Didn't I)" (Richard Gower) – 3:39

== Chart positions ==
Chart (1980)	Peak position
Austrian Singles Chart	17
Dutch Singles Chart	9
German Singles Chart	3
Irish Singles Chart	2
Swiss Singles Chart	5
UK Singles Chart	2

== Certifications ==
Region	Certification	Certified units/sales
United Kingdom (BPI)	Silver	250,000^{^}
^{^} Shipments figures based on certification alone.
