= Jean Constantin (songwriter) =

French singer-songwriter

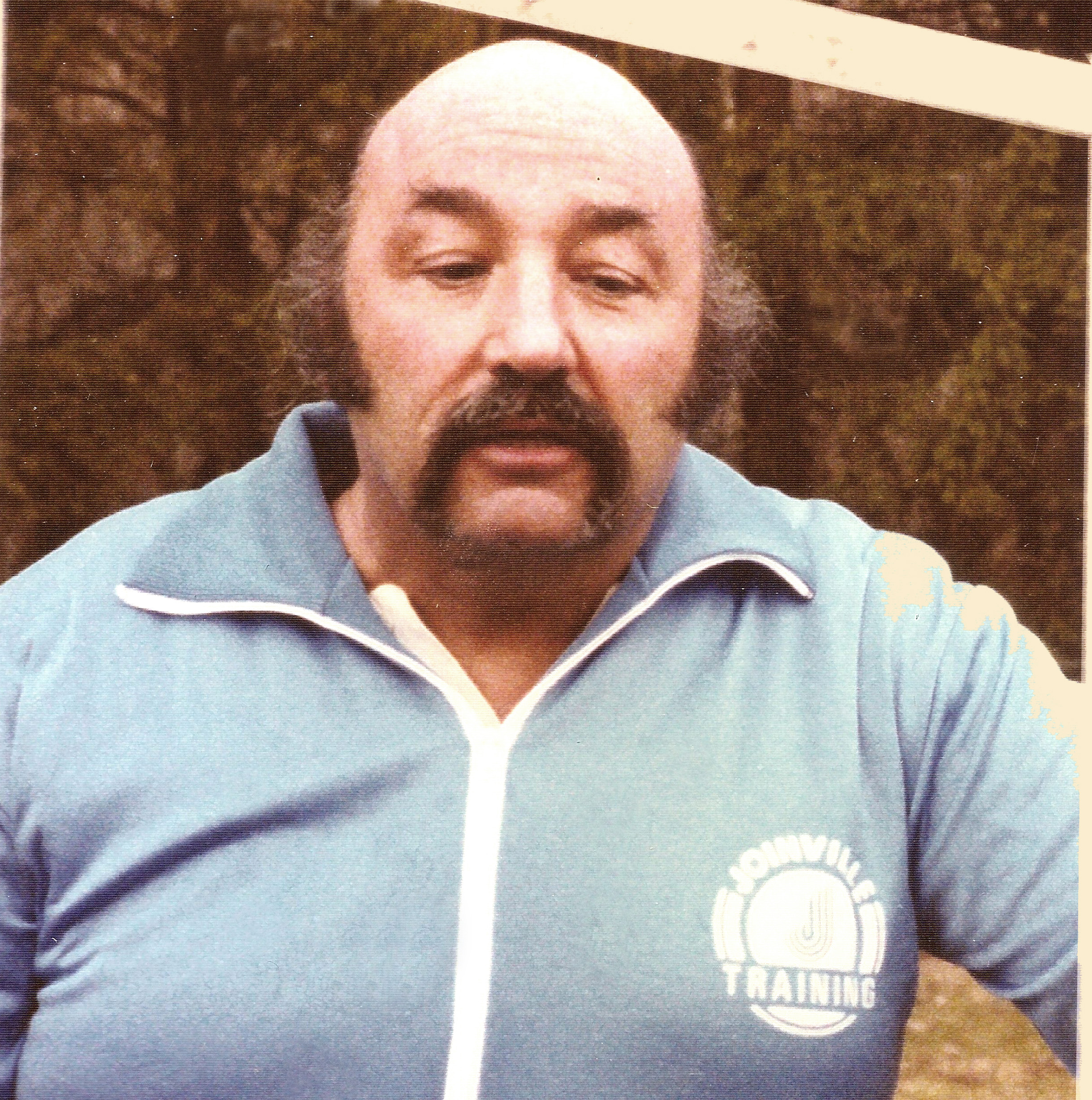
- Jean Constantin

Background information
- Born: 9 February 1923; Paris, France
- Died: 30 January 1997 (aged 73) Créteil, Val-de-Marne, France
- Genres: Film scores, songs
- Occupations: Composer, singer
- Instruments: Piano, voice

Jean Constantin (9 February 1923 – 30 January 1997) was a French singer, songwriter and composer. A prominent songwriter in France, he wrote several songs that became hits like Mon manège à moi sung by Édith Piaf and Mon truc en plumes sung by Zizi Jeanmaire.

Despite being a notable performer of the piano and singing his own work, he was far more prominent for his songwriting for other French artists and musicians.

He also wrote several movie scores, most notably the soundtrack of the film classic The 400 Blows (1959).

== Singer-songwriter ==
Jean Constantin is the composer of one of Édith Piaf's greatest hits, "Mon manège à moi" (1952), with music by Norbert Glanzberg. In 1955, Annie Cordy recorded his song "Jolie fleur de papillon." That same year, "Ne joue pas avec mon cœur" was performed by Colette Deréal, then by Dalida and Lucienne Delyle.

He composed the music for Zizi Jeanmaire's most popular song: "Mon truc en plumes," with lyrics by Bernard Dimey (1956). He wrote the songs "Ma gigolette" (1960) and "Pianola" (1963) for Yves Montand, songs which also became classics of French music thanks to Montand.

After composing the music for the film "Bonjour sourire" (1956), he wrote the score for one of the emblematic films of the French New Wave in 1959: François Truffaut's "Les Quatre Cents Coups." Juliette Gréco recorded a sung version of the film's main theme, "Comment voulez-vous?" (lyrics by Jean Constantin). This was followed by, among others, "La Française et l'Amour" (1960) and "Le Caïd de Champignol" (1966).
