= I Gave You My Heart (Didn't I) =

1984 single by British band Hot Chocolate

- 7" vinyl single cover

Single by Hot Chocolate

from the album Love Shot
- B-side: "Jeannie"
- Released: 1984
- Length: 3:40
- Label: Rak
- Songwriter: Richard Gower
- Producer: Mickie Most

Hot Chocolate singles chronology
"I'm Sorry" (1983)	"I Gave You My Heart (Didn't I)" (1984)	"Heartache No. 9" (1986)

"I Gave You My Heart (Didn't I)" is the third single taken from Hot Chocolate's 1983 album Love Shot. It was the only Top-20 single from the album, peaking at number 13 in the UK Singles Chart in 1984. It remains a popular favourite among fans, but is not one of their more significant hits. The songwriter was Richard Gower, lead singer of the group Racey.

== Track listing ==
7" vinyl

1. "I Gave You My Heart (Didn't I)" (Richard Gower) – 3:33
2. "Jeannie" (Errol Brown) – 3:49
