= Clock (British group) =

English band

- Origin: Manchester, England
- Genres: Eurodance, electronic, hip house
- Years active: 1993–1999
- Label: Media Records
- Past members: Stu Allan; Pete Pritchard; Marcus Thomas; Lorna Saunders; Ché-gun Peters

Clock were a British group from Manchester, England, primarily led by Stu Allan and Pete Pritchard and fronted by rapper Marcus Thomas (using the name ODC MC) and vocalist Lorna Saunders (using the name Tinka), though the single "Keep the Fires Burning" was sung by Georgia Lewis. They resembled many Eurodance acts of the time with a female singer and male rapper. Their earlier work was harder, similar to Cappella, but once they started releasing covers, their sound became more dance/pop oriented. Thomas left in 1998 to join the band Tzant, to be replaced by Ché-gun Peters.

They had a string of top 40 hits with nine covers during the 1990s on the UK Singles Chart. They also released hardcore versions of their hits under the name Visa. Clock broke up in 1999 due to a number of personal reasons; they were not able to continue at the same pace as they had before.

In 2004, Saunders appeared on BBC Television's Never Mind the Buzzcocks in the celebrity line-up. It was announced that she was working as a legal secretary. In 2015, it was revealed that Saunders worked as a lawyer for Jackamans and is married with two children.

In September 2022, Allan died at age 60 from gastrointestinal cancer.

== Discography ==
=== Albums ===
List of albums, with selected chart positions
Title	Album details	Peak chart positions	
Title	Album details	UK Albums Chart	AUS
It's Time...	16 September 1995	27	161
About Time 2	28 March 1997	56	—
Boogie Sound	Japan only	—	—
Hits Around the Clock – Best Of	Japan only	—	—

=== Singles ===
Year	Title	Peak chart positions										Album
Year	Title	UK Singles	UK Dance	AUS	EUR	FIN	FRA	IRE	NED	NZ	SWE	Album
1993	"Holding On"	66	—	—	—	—	—	—	—	—	—	It's Time...
1994	"The Rhythm"	28	1	171	—	—	—	—	—	—	—	It's Time...
1994	"Keep the Fires Burning"	36	—	205	—	—	—	—	—	—	—	It's Time...
1995	"Axel F" / "Keep Pushin'"	7	—	42	20	—	—	8	45	—	37	It's Time...
1995	"Whoomph! (There It Is)"	4	3	96	11	—	—	5	—	—	36	It's Time...
1995	"Everybody"	6	—	105	—	16	—	17	—	—	—	It's Time...
1995	"In the House"	23	—	—	—	—	—	—	—	—	—	It's Time...
1996	"Holding On 4 U"	27	—	183	—	—	—	—	—	—	—	It's Time...
1996	"Oh What a Night"	13	20	153	49	—	—	13	—	—	—	About Time 2
1997	"It's Over"	10	—	—	—	—	—	—	—	—	—	About Time 2
1997	"U Sexy Thing"	11	—	100	31	—	—	8	—	—	—	Boogie Sound
1998	"That's the Way (I Like It)"	11	—	137	—	—	66	17	—	—	—	Boogie Sound
1998	"Rock Your Body"	30	—	—	—	—	—	—	—	—	—	Boogie Sound
1998	"Blame It on the Boogie"	16	—	132	—	—	—	—	—	22	—	Boogie Sound
1999	"Sunshine Day"	58	—	—	—	—	—	—	—	—	—	Non-album single
"—" denotes items which were not released in that country or failed to chart.
