= I'll Put You Together Again =

"I’ll Put You Together Again"
- 7" vinyl single cover

Single by Hot Chocolate
- B-side: "West End of Park Avenue"
- Released: 17 November 1978
- Length: 3:52
- Label: Rak
- Songwriter(s): Don Black, Geoff Stephens
- Producer(s): Mickie Most

"I’ll Put You Together Again" is a song and single written by Don Black and Geoff Stephens performed by Hot Chocolate and released in 1978.

The song was originally written for the musical, Dear Anyone which first appeared in concept album format in 1978 and on the stage in 1983. It was performed on the album by Maggie Moone. In 1978, Moone released the song as a single which peaked at number 98 in Australia.

The single by Hot Chocolate made number 13 in the UK Singles Charts in 1978 staying in the charts for 11 weeks. It was also included on their 1993 compilation album, Their Greatest Hits.
