= Emma (Hot Chocolate song) =

- Belgian 7" vinyl single cover

Single by Hot Chocolate

from the album Cicero Park
- B-side: "Makin’ Music" (UK) "A Love Like Yours" (US)
- Released: 25 February 1974
- Genre: British soul
- Length: 3:52
- Label: RAK, Big Tree (US)
- Songwriters: Errol Brown, Tony Wilson
- Producer: Mickie Most

Hot Chocolate singles chronology
"Rumours" (1973)	"Emma" (1974)	"Changing World" (1974)

Music video
- "Emma" (TopPop, 1974) on YouTube

"Emma" is a 1974 song by the British soul band Hot Chocolate. Written by band members Errol Brown (vocals) and Tony Wilson (music), the song addresses themes of suicide, early death and lost childhood. Brown's lyrics celebrate his then recently deceased mother. Its rawness was developed after producer Mickie Most asked him for further "depth and darkness".

"Emma" reached number 3 on the UK Singles Chart and number 8 on the US Billboard Hot 100 chart.

== Lyrics ==
The song details the love of the (nameless) singer and a girl called Emmalene from the age of five, through a wedding at 17, until her suicide in December at an unspecified date. Emma it seems wanted to be a "movie queen" but could never find the breaks and eventually kills herself because she "just can't keep on living on dreams no more."

== Chart history ==
=== Weekly charts ===
Chart (1974–75)	Peak position
Australia (Kent Music Report)	6
Belgium	2
Canada RPM Top Singles	5
Germany	19
Ireland (IRMA)	7
Netherlands	2
New Zealand (Listener)	2
UK	3
U.S. Billboard Hot 100	8
U.S. Cash Box Top 100	6

=== Year-end charts ===
Chart (1974)	Rank
Australia (Kent Music Report)	45
UK	44
Chart (1975)	Rank
Canada	45
U.S. (Joel Whitburn's Pop Annual)	93
U.S. Cash Box	87

== Certifications ==
Region	Certification	Certified units/sales
United Kingdom (BPI)	Silver	250,000^{^}
^{^} Shipments figures based on certification alone.

== Cover versions ==
- A version by Đorđe Marjanović with new lyrics in Serbo-Croatian and titled "Ema, Emili" was released on the b-side of one of his 1974 singles. It also appeared on his 1975 album A život teče dalje....
- Earth Quake recorded a cover version for their 1977 album, Leveled.
- The Sisters of Mercy started performing the song live in 1983. The studio version was released on the b-side of the 12" version of their 1988 single, "Dominion", and on the 2006 re-release of the album, Floodland. A much-bootlegged alternate version from a 1984 John Peel radio session was officially released in 2021 on the "BBC Sessions 1982–1984" compilation.
- Urge Overkill recorded a version for 1990 Touch and Go Records release, The Supersonic Storybook.
