= Brother Louie (Hot Chocolate song) =

1973 song by Hot Chocolate

Single by Hot Chocolate
- B-side: "I Want to Be Free"
- Released: 23 March 1973
- Length: 4:23
- Label: Rak
- Songwriters: Errol Brown; Tony Wilson
- Producer: Mickie Most

Hot Chocolate singles chronology
| "You'll Always Be a Friend" (1972) | "Brother Louie" (1973) | "Rumours" (1973) |

"Brother Louie" is a song by British soul band Hot Chocolate. Written by members Errol Brown and Tony Wilson and produced by Mickie Most, the song discusses an interracial love affair between a white man and a black woman, and the subsequent rejection of both by their parents because of it. Upon its release as a single, "Brother Louie" peaked at number 7 on the UK Singles Chart in 1973. Alexis Korner has a spoken-word part in this version of the song. Phil Dennys arranged the string section.

== Stories version ==
"Brother Louie"

Single by Stories

from the album About Us
- B-side: "What Comes After"
- Released: 12 June 1973; 31 July 1990 (re-release)
- Genre: Rock; funk; disco; blue-eyed soul
- Length: 3:55
- Label: Kama Sutra
- Songwriters: Errol Brown; Tony Wilson
- Producers: Kenny Kerner; Richie Wise

Stories singles chronology
| "Love Is in Motion" (1973) | "Brother Louie" (1973) | "Mammy Blue" (1973) |

Official audio
- "Brother Louie" on YouTube

"Brother Louie" was covered by the American band Stories (featuring singer Ian Lloyd) about six months after Hot Chocolate's UK hit. The Stories version reached number 1 on the Billboard Hot 100 in the US and sold a million-plus copies to earn a gold disc.

== Charts ==
=== Hot Chocolate version ===
| Chart (1973) | Peak position |
|---|---|
| Ireland (IRMA) | 19 |
| UK Singles (Official Charts) | 7 |

=== Stories version ===
==== Weekly charts ====
| Chart (1973) | Peak position |
|---|---|
| Australia (Kent Music Report) | 36 |
| Canada Top Singles (RPM) | 1 |
| US Billboard Hot 100 | 1 |
| US Hot R&B/Hip-Hop Songs (Billboard) | 22 |
| US Cash Box Top 100 | 1 |
| US Cash Box R&B | 12 |

==== Year-end charts ====
| Chart (1973) | Position |
|---|---|
| Canada Top Singles (RPM) | 9 |
| US Billboard Hot 100 | 13 |
| US Cash Box Top 100 | 19 |

==== All-time charts ====
| Chart (1958–2018) | Position |
|---|---|
| US Billboard Hot 100 | 349 |

==== Certifications ====
| Region | Certification | Certified units/sales |
|---|---|---|
| United States (RIAA) | Gold | 1,000,000^{^} |
^{^} Shipments figures based on certification alone.

== Other versions ==
Another cover was released in 1973 by Roy Ayers on his album Virgo Red, playing vibes instead of singing. The song has since been covered by many other artists, notably Vandenberg singer Bert Heerink who had a top 10 hit in 1995 in the Netherlands with a Dutch version titled "Julie July", and a version by English rock band the Quireboys in 1993 which reached number 32 in the UK.

Puerto Rican/American musician Louie Louie recorded a cover version of the song for his second studio album, Let's Get Started (1993). It was produced by George Michael.

== In popular culture ==
The recording by Stories was featured in the film A Guide to Recognizing Your Saints (2006). The same version also appeared in an episode of the series Nip/Tuck. An alternative rendition of the Stories version of the song was included in the soundtrack of the 2007 film Zodiac. It was also on the soundtrack to the 1999 film Dick and in the 2005 French-Canadian film C.R.A.Z.Y., but the song's first film appearance was in Wim Wenders' 1974 film Alice in the Cities (7:15 into the film).

The song, with slightly different wording, is used as the theme song to the television series Louie, a sitcom loosely based on the life of American comedian Louis C.K. The word "cry" was changed to "die" in the second repetition of the chorus. This version was produced by Reggie Watts, with the intro emulating the Hot Chocolate version, and with Stories singer Ian Lloyd reprising his vocals.

The Stories recording was used as walk-up music by New York Mets baseball player Luis Guillorme.
