= Tony Wilson (musician) =

Trinidadian vocalist and guitarist (1936–2026)

- Born: Anthony Nathaniel Wilson; 8 October 1936; Port of Spain, Trinidad and Tobago
- Died: 24 April 2026 (aged 89) Trinidad and Tobago
- Genres: Pop; soul; funk; disco
- Occupations: Musician; songwriter
- Instruments: Bass guitar; vocals
- Labels: Apple; RAK; EMI; WEA

Anthony Nathaniel Wilson (8 October 1936 – 24 April 2026) was a Trinidad and Tobago vocalist, bass guitarist, and songwriter, best known for his work with soul and funk band Hot Chocolate. He co-wrote the Hot Chocolate hits "Love Is Life", "Brother Louie", "Emma", and "You Sexy Thing".

== Early life and career ==
Wilson was born in Port of Spain, on 8 October 1936, to Gladys (née Hernandez) and Wilfred Wilson. He was educated at Tranquillity Boys School, and Belmont Secondary School and was involved with music from the age of 16. In 1961 Wilson migrated to the United Kingdom where he played with The Flames, The Souvenirs, and The Corduroys. In 1963 he recorded a cover version of "How Many Teardrops" by Lou Christie with The Souvenirs, which was released on Decca Records.

Wilson was a member of the group Soul Brothers, who released three singles. Wilson worked as a songwriter in the 1960s, and wrote songs such as "Bet Yer Life I Do" (Herman's Hermits), "Heaven Is Here" (Julie Felix), and "Think About Your Children" (Mary Hopkin). Wilson met Errol Brown in the late 1960s, as Brown lived in the flat opposite to him. They soon formed Hot Chocolate.

== Hot Chocolate ==
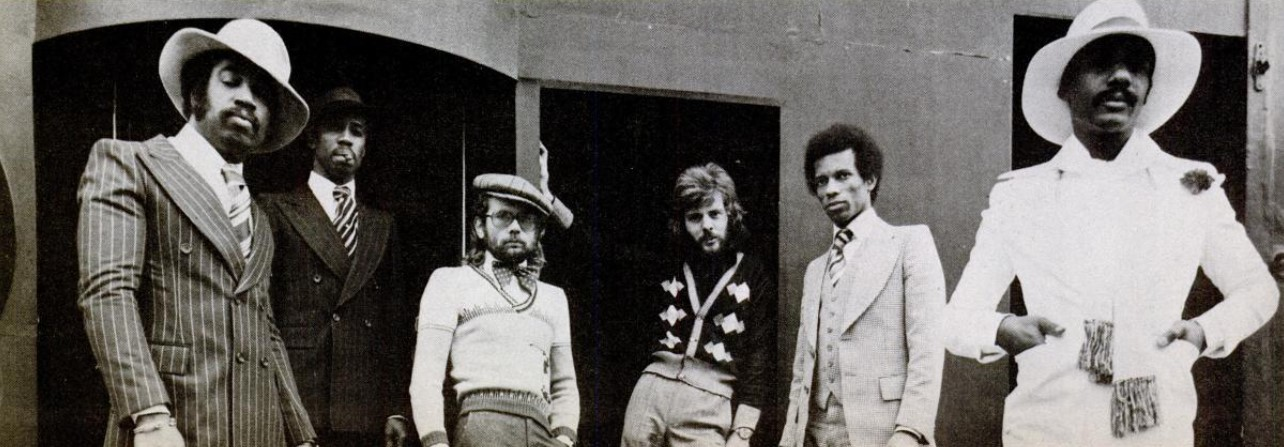
Wilson with Hot Chocolate in 1974

Wilson was a founding member of Hot Chocolate in 1968, and left the band in 1975. Wilson is credited with persuading Hot Chocolate's lead singer Errol Brown to commit his songwriting ideas to paper. He shared lead vocal duties with Brown on Hot Chocolate's early hits. The two wrote many of their earliest hits including: "Love Is Life", "You Could Have Been a Lady", "Emma", "Brother Louie", and "You Sexy Thing".

He left Hot Chocolate in 1975 to begin a solo career. Percussionist Patrick Olive later switched to bass. One main reason for Wilson's departure was because Tony had originally been the lead singer for the band, but Mickie Most, who had been producing for them, wanted to push Brown forward as the frontman instead, which angered Tony, as even Errol and band mates agreed that Tony had the better singing voice:

I told him: "If that is the way that you feel, I don't think we should share royalties any more." His retort was: "I don't want to share anything with you anyway." It must be very tough for him now because that song was "You Sexy Thing" which went on to become a standard. That one argument must have cost him millions of pounds.

— Errol Brown, 1998

== Post–Hot Chocolate ==
Wilson signed to Albert Grossman’s Bearsville label. His first solo album, I Like Your Style was recorded in De Lane Lea Studios in Wembley between 1975 and 1976, and was released in 1976. After the album was released, he and his family moved to the town of Bearsville, New York, in the United States.

In 1979, Wilson asked to write a song for Bill Haley for his upcoming album. The next day, he came back into the studio with a cassette tape featuring a song called "Everyone Can Rock and Roll". Haley liked the song so much, that not only was it featured on the album, but it also became the title of the album. In the 1980s, Wilson worked in a band called Real Magic.

== Personal life and death ==
According to a 1998 interview with Errol Brown, he and Wilson had lost touch. As of 2012, Wilson was living in Trinidad and Tobago. A 1966 Fender Jazz Bass owned by Wilson was brought into The Repair Shop. It had a missing logo, a broken nut, worn out frets, missing pickup and bridge covers, and was partially missing paint.

Wilson died on 24 April 2026, at the age of 89 at his Trinidad home.

== Discography ==
Selected Hot Chocolate songs (See full discography at Hot Chocolate discography)

- "Give Peace a Chance" (1969)
- "Love Is Life" (1970)
- "You Could Have Been a Lady" (1971)
- "Brother Louie" (1973)
- "Emma" (1974)
- "You Sexy Thing" (1975)
