= Love Is Life =

- Spanish 7" vinyl single cover

Single by Hot Chocolate
- B-side: "Pretty Girls"
- Released: 1970
- Genre: Soul pop
- Length: 3:39
- Label: RAK
- Songwriters: Errol Brown, Tony Wilson
- Producer: Mickie Most

Hot Chocolate singles chronology
"Give Peace a Chance" (1969)	"Love Is Life" (1970)	"You Could Have Been a Lady" (1971)

"Love Is Life" is a song and single performed by British group, Hot Chocolate with accompaniment by the Trinidad Singers and written by band members, Errol Brown and Tony Wilson. Produced by Mickie Most, it was released in 1970 and reached 6, on the UK charts, staying for twelve weeks and was their first single to make the UK Charts.
