= You Could've Been a Lady =

1971 single by Hot Chocolate

- Portuguese 7" vinyl single cover

Single by Hot Chocolate
- B-side: "Everybody's Laughing"
- Released: January 1971
- Length: 3:42
- Label: Rak
- Songwriters: Errol Brown; Tony Wilson
- Producer: Mickie Most

Hot Chocolate singles chronology
"Love Is Life" (1970)	"You Could've Been a Lady" (1971)	"I Believe (In Love)" (1971)

"You Could've Been a Lady" is a song by the British soul band Hot Chocolate, written by Errol Brown and Tony Wilson in 1969. Released as a single in 1971, it peaked at number 22 on the UK Singles Chart during a nine-week run. Although initially released by Hot Chocolate as a non-album single, the song later appeared on the 2009 reissue of Cicero Park.

In 1976, the band re-recorded the song for their Man to Man album. Boasting a fuller, heavier production than the 3:42 original, it runs for 4:25. Rather than the original single version, a 3:48 edit of the re-recording has appeared on all compilation albums issued both by the band and with various other artists.

"You Could've Been a Lady" has many similarities to "Why Don't You Quit" by American jazz musician Eddie Harris.

== April Wine version ==
"You Could Have Been a Lady"

Single by April Wine

from the album On Record
- B-side: "Teacher"
- Released: November 1971 (Canada); March 1972 (US); May 1972 (UK)
- Genre: Hard rock
- Length: 3:20
- Label: Aquarius (Canada); Big Tree (US); Pye (Europe)
- Songwriters: Errol Brown; Tony Wilson
- Producer: Ralph Murphy

April Wine singles chronology
"Fast Train" (1971)	"You Could Have Been a Lady" (00000012)	"Bad Side of the Moon" (1972)

The song had further success in North America when it was covered by Canadian rock band April Wine for their 1972 studio album, On Record. Released as the album's first single, it was their first hit, reaching number two on the RPM 100 in Canada and number 32 on the Billboard Hot 100 in the United States.
