= So You Win Again =

1977 single by British band Hot Chocolate

Single by Hot Chocolate

from the album Every 1's a Winner
- B-side: "A Part of Being with You"
- Released: June 1977
- Recorded: 1977
- Genre: Disco
- Length: 4:32 (album version); 4:21 (single version)
- Label: RAK
- Songwriter: Russ Ballard
- Producer: Mickie Most

Hot Chocolate singles chronology
| "Heaven Is in the Back Seat of My Cadillac" (1976) | "So You Win Again" (1977) | "Put Your Love in Me" (1977) |

Music video
- "So You Win Again" (TopPop, 1977) on YouTube

"So You Win Again" is a song by British band Hot Chocolate, released in June 1977 as the lead single from the album Every 1's a Winner.

Written by Russ Ballard and produced by Mickie Most, it is the band's sole UK number one single, spending three weeks at the top in July 1977, and one week as an NME number-one single. The song made it to No. 3 in Australia, No. 6 in Germany, and just missed the top 30 on the Billboard Hot 100 chart in the United States, peaking at No. 31.

== Performances ==
- Hot Chocolate performed the song on Top of the Pops.

== Charts ==
=== Weekly charts ===
| Chart (1977) | Peak position |
|---|---|
| Australia (Kent Music Report) | 12 |
| Austria (Ö3 Austria Top 40) | 6 |
| Belgium (Ultratop 50 Flanders) | 6 |
| Belgium (Ultratop 50 Wallonia) | 7 |
| Canada Top Singles (RPM) | 54 |
| Netherlands (Dutch Top 40) | 7 |
| Netherlands (Single Top 100) | 5 |
| New Zealand (Recorded Music NZ) | 8 |
| Norway (VG-lista) | 6 |
| Sweden (Sverigetopplistan) | 13 |
| UK Singles (OCC) | 1 |
| US Billboard Hot 100 | 31 |
| US Hot R&B/Hip-Hop Songs (Billboard) | 82 |
| West Germany (GfK) | 6 |

=== Year-end charts ===
| Chart (1977) | Position |
|---|---|
| Australia (Kent Music Report) | 62 |
| Austria (Ö3 Austria Top 40) | 24 |
| Belgium (Ultratop Flanders) | 62 |
| Netherlands (Dutch Top 40) | 53 |
| Netherlands (Single Top 100) | 51 |
| West Germany (Official German Charts) | 24 |

== Certifications ==
| Region | Certification | Certified units/sales |
|---|---|---|
| United Kingdom (BPI) | Silver | 250,000^{^} |
^{^} Shipments figures based on certification alone.

== Cover versions ==
- In June 1978, South African band Copperfield entered the local charts with their slowed-down, ballad interpretation of the song, which peaked at No. 2.

== Popular culture ==
- The song was included on the soundtrack for the 1997 British film, Metroland.
