= You Sexy Thing =

1975 single by Hot Chocolate

- Artwork for 1987 vinyl single remix release

Single by Hot Chocolate

from the album Hot Chocolate
- B-side: "A Warm Smile"; "Amazing Skin Song"; "Call the Police"
- Released: 24 October 1975
- Genre: Funk; disco; pop-soul; British soul; R&B
- Length: 4:04 (album version); 3:34 (single version)
- Label: RAK (UK); Big Tree (Atlantic) (US)
- Songwriters: Errol Brown; Tony Wilson
- Producer: Mickie Most

Hot Chocolate singles chronology
"A Child's Prayer" (1975)	"You Sexy Thing" (1975)	"Don't Stop It Now" (1976)

Official audio
- "You Sexy Thing" (album version) on YouTube

"You Sexy Thing" is a song by the British soul band Hot Chocolate. It was written by lead singer Errol Brown and bass guitarist Tony Wilson and was produced by Mickie Most. The song was released in October 1975 as the second single from their second album, Hot Chocolate, and reached number two on the UK Singles Chart in November 1975, as well as number three on the US Billboard Hot 100 the following February. Billboard ranked it the number 22 song for 1976. It went on to gain notability by being featured in the 1997 film The Full Monty.

== Overview ==
The song was originally a B-side. Not yet convinced that the song could be a hit, producer Mickie Most put it on the flip side of the Hot Chocolate single "Blue Night". Some months later, Most released a re-recorded version of the song as an A-side on his RAK label. The song was a hit and ultimately became the group's best-known song. In the UK the song was poised for the number-one spot, but was beaten to it by "Bohemian Rhapsody", when on 29 November 1975 the Queen single leapfrogged it from number nine.

A 1987 remix by Ben Liebrand hit number 10. The release of the compilation album The Very Best of Hot Chocolate, featuring the Liebrand remix, reached number one on the UK Albums Chart in February 1987. Ten years later, when it was featured in the film The Full Monty, it went to number six. In the film, the male lead Gaz (played by Robert Carlyle) performs a striptease to the music of "You Sexy Thing". Another US resurgence in 1999 can be credited to a Burger King television commercial in which the song played while the camera examined a Double Whopper. A 2025 Verizon ad for the iPhone 17 features the instrumental track. In addition, it is the only song to have entered the UK Top Ten in the 1970s, '80s, and '90s.

== Composition ==
The sheet music for "You Sexy Thing" shows the key of F major.

== Track listings ==
=== 1975 release ===
- 7-inch single (Europe, Japan)
1. "You Sexy Thing" (Errol Brown, Tony Wilson) – 4:04
2. "A Warm Smile" (Harvey Hinsley, Patrick Olive, Tony Connor) – 5:23
- 7-inch single (1) (North America)
1. "You Sexy Thing" (Errol Brown, Tony Wilson) – 3:30
2. "Amazing Skin Song" (Errol Brown) – 4:04
- 7-inch single (2) (North America)
1. "You Sexy Thing" (Errol Brown, Tony Wilson) – 3:30
2. "Call the Police" (Tony Wilson) – 4:04

=== 1987 re-release (remix by Ben Liebrand) ===
- 7-inch single
1. "You Sexy Thing" (Errol Brown, Tony Wilson) – 3:46
2. "Every 1's a Winner" (Errol Brown) – 4:01
- 12-inch single (1)
1. "You Sexy Thing (Extended Replay Mix)" (Errol Brown, Tony Wilson) – 7:07
2. "You Sexy Thing (Sexy Bonus Beats)" (Errol Brown, Tony Wilson) – 2:33
3. "You Sexy Thing (Sexy Instrumental)" (Errol Brown, Tony Wilson) – 3:58
4. "Every 1's a Winner" (Errol Brown) – 4:01
- 12-inch single (2)
1. "You Sexy Thing (Extended Replay Mix)" (Errol Brown, Tony Wilson) – 7:07
2. "Megamix" – 9:27
  - "Emma" (E. Brown*, T. Wilson)
  - "So You Win Again" (Russ Ballard)
  - "You Sexy Thing" (E. Brown, T. Wilson)
  - "Every 1's a Winner" (Brown)
  - "You Could've Been a Lady" (Brown)
  - "Heaven Is in the Back Seat of My Cadillac" (Brown)
3. "Every 1's a Winner" (Errol Brown) – 4:01

=== 1997 re-release ===
- CD single
1. "You Sexy Thing" (Errol Brown, Tony Wilson) – 4:02
2. "You Sexy Thing (Remix)" (Errol Brown, Tony Wilson) – 3:46
3. "Every 1's a Winner (Groove Mix)" (Errol Brown) – 3:54

== Charts ==
=== Weekly charts ===
Chart (1975–1976)	Peak position
Australia (Kent Music Report)	4
Austria (Ö3 Austria Top 40)	12
Canada Top Singles (RPM)	5
Ireland (IRMA)	4
Netherlands (Single Top 100)	5
New Zealand (RIANZ)	2
Norway (VG-lista)	10
Sweden (Topplistan)	16
UK Singles (Official Charts)	2
US Billboard Hot 100	3
US Hot Soul Singles (Billboard)	6
US Cash Box Top 100	2
West Germany (GfK)	8

Chart (1987)	Peak position
Austria (Ö3 Austria Top 40)	4
Belgium (Ultratop 50 Flanders)	20
Netherlands (Single Top 100)	56
New Zealand (RIANZ)	2
Switzerland (Schweizer Hitparade)	10
UK Singles (Official Charts)	10
West Germany (GfK)	5

Chart (1997)	Peak position
Australia (ARIA)	80
Europe (Eurochart Hot 100)	38
Scotland (OCC)	16
UK Singles (Official Charts)	6

=== Year-end charts ===
Chart (1975)	Rank
UK Singles (OCC)	41

Chart (1976)	Rank
Australia (Kent Music Report)	33
Canada Top Singles (RPM)	71
New Zealand (RIANZ)	14
US Billboard Hot 100	22

Chart (1987)	Rank
Austria (Ö3 Austria Top 40)	19
New Zealand (RIANZ)	31
West Germany (Media Control)	33

Chart (1997)	Rank
UK Singles (OCC)	75

== Certifications ==
Region	Certification	Certified units/sales
New Zealand (RMNZ)	3× Platinum	90,000^{‡}
United Kingdom (BPI)	Platinum	600,000^{‡}
United States (RIAA)	Gold	1,000,000^{^}
^{^} Shipments figures based on certification alone.^{‡} Sales+streaming figures based on certification alone.

== Cover versions ==
In 1997, two covers were released almost simultaneously as the re-issue of the Hot Chocolate original. One cover was by pop duo T-Shirt, featuring actress Chloé Treend and songwriter Miranda Cooper, while the other version was by English pop/dance act Clock. Both are re-workings with the original music and lyrics but with new additional vocal segments.

=== T-Shirt version ===
"You Sexy Thing"

Single by T-Shirt
- Released: 25 August 1997
- Length: 3:59 (radio edit)
- Label: Eternal
- Songwriters: Errol Brown; Tony Wilson
- Producer: Metro

Music video
- "You Sexy Thing" on YouTube

Actress Chloé Treend and songwriter Miranda Cooper collaborated under the name T-Shirt to release a cover of "You Sexy Thing" in August 1997. This version reached number 63 in the United Kingdom, number five in New Zealand, and number six in Australia. It earned platinum sales certifications in Australia and New Zealand. British magazine Music Week rated this version three out of five, writing, "The Hot Chocolate hit gets a Spice Girls-style reworking with chirpy, cocky vocals mixed in with Errol Brown's soulful delivery. A fresh take on a pop classic."

==== Charts ====
===== Weekly charts =====
Chart (1997–1998)	Peak position
Australia (ARIA)	6
Belgium (Ultratip Bubbling Under Flanders)	10
New Zealand (Recorded Music NZ)	5
Scottish Singles Sales (Official Charts)	69
UK Singles (Official Charts)	63

===== Year-end charts =====
Chart (1997)	Position
Australia (ARIA)	49

Chart (1998)	Position
Australia (ARIA)	30

==== Certifications ====
Region	Certification	Certified units/sales
Australia (ARIA)	Platinum	70,000^{^}
New Zealand (RMNZ)	Platinum	10,000^{*}
^{*} Sales figures based on certification alone.^{^} Shipments figures based on certification alone.

=== Clock version ===
"U Sexy Thing"

Single by Clock
- Released: 6 October 1997
- Genre: Eurodance
- Length: 3:39
- Label: Power Station; Media
- Songwriters: Errol Brown; Tony Wilson

Clock singles chronology
"Oh What a Night" (1996)	"U Sexy Thing" (1997)	"That's the Way (I Like It)" (1997)

Music video
- "You Sexy Thing" on YouTube

British pop/dance act Clock released a cover of "You Sexy Thing" as "U Sexy Thing" in October 1997. It peaked at eight in Ireland, eleven in the United Kingdom, and 100 in Australia. On the Eurochart Hot 100, it reached its highest position as number 31 in November 1997. A music video was also produced to promote the single, featuring the act performing in a swimming pool.

==== Critical reception ====
A reviewer from Music Week rated Clock's version three out of five, adding, "Using what sounds like a sample from the Hot Chocolate version, this Xerox cover has all the elements but little of Errol Brown's soul. Still, catchy enough to be a hit." Music Week editor Alan Jones wrote, "Clock have ticked up an impressive number of hits over the past four years, and are destined for another with a rather tame remake [...]. They stick closely to the original, save for a rather perfunctory rap, but the song's quality wins the day." Kirstin Watson from Smash Hits gave it one out of five, saying, "It's faster and funkier than the original, but has been filled with ear-bashing raps and plinky-plonky bits."

==== Charts ====
===== Weekly charts =====
Chart (1997)	Peak position
Australia (ARIA)	100
Europe (Eurochart Hot 100)	31
Ireland (IRMA)	8
Scottish Singles Sales (Official Charts)	12
UK Singles (Official Charts)	11

===== Year-end charts =====
Chart (1997)	Position
UK Singles (OCC)	103
