= Every 1's a Winner (song) =

Single by Hot Chocolate

from the album Every 1's a Winner
- B-side: "Power of Love"
- Released: 17 February 1978
- Genre: British soul
- Length: 4:49 (album version); 4:04 (UK single version); 3:38 (US single edit); 7:17 (12-inch version)
- Label: RAK
- Songwriter: Errol Brown
- Producer: Mickie Most

Hot Chocolate singles chronology
"Put Your Love In Me" (1977)	"Every 1's a Winner" (1978)	"I'll Put You Together Again" (1978)

"Every 1's a Winner" is the third single from the 1978 Hot Chocolate album of the same name. The single was released on 4 March 1978 on RAK Records in the UK and Infinity Records in the US. It peaked at number 12 on the UK Singles Chart and number 6 on the US Billboard Hot 100; it was the band's second-highest-charting single in the US, behind "You Sexy Thing". A music video of the group performing the song (using the album version) was also made.

== Track listing ==
All tracks written by Errol Brown; except where indicated.

=== 1978 release ===
7" vinyl

1. "Every 1's a Winner" – 3:35
2. "Power of Love" (Harvey Hinsley, Patrick Olive, Tony Connor) – 3:19

12" vinyl (Infinity Records, US)

1. "Every 1's a Winner" – 7:17
2. "Put Your Love in Me" – 5:48

=== 1988 remix ===
7" single

1. "Every 1's a Winner (Groove Mix)" – 3:54
2. "So You Win Again" (Russ Ballard) – 4:29

12" single 1

1. "Every 1's a Winner" (Sexy Remix) – 6:28
2. "Every 1's a Winner" (Bonus Beats) – 2:32
3. "Every 1's a Winner" (7" Groove Mix) – 3:53
4. "So You Win Again" (Ballard) – 4:29

12" single 2

1. "Every 1's a Winner" (Extended Groove Remix) – 6:40
2. "Every 1's a Winner" (Groove Mix Bonus Beats) – 3:05
3. "Every 1's a Winner" (7" Groove Mix) – 3:53
4. "So You Win Again" (Ballard) – 4:29

== Chart history ==
=== Weekly charts ===
Weekly chart performance for "Every 1's a Winner"
Chart (1978–1979)	Peak position
Australia (Kent Music Report)	12
Belgium	29
Canada RPM Top Singles	5
Germany	14
Ireland (IRMA)	11
Netherlands	10
New Zealand	7
UK	12
US Billboard Hot 100	6
US Billboard Hot Soul Songs	7
US Cash Box Top 100	7

=== Year-end charts ===
Year-end chart performance for "Every 1's a Winner"
Chart (1979)	Rank
Australia (Kent Music Report)	69
Canada	44
US Billboard Hot 100	55
US Cash Box	60

== Certifications ==
Certifications for "Every 1's a Winner"
Region	Certification	Certified units/sales
United Kingdom (BPI)	Silver	200,000^{‡}
^{‡} Sales+streaming figures based on certification alone.

== Remixes, covers and sampling ==
Hot Chocolate released a remixed version of the song on their 1987 album 2001; the remix reached number 67 in the UK. A 1999 version of the song by Electrotheque reached number 85 in the UK.
