= Errol Brown =

British-Jamaican singer and songwriter (1943–2015)

Errol Brown MBE
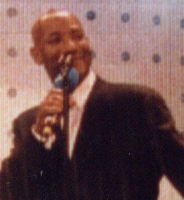
- Brown in 1998

Background information
- Born: Lester Errol Brown; 12 November 1943; Kingston, Colony of Jamaica
- Died: 6 May 2015 (aged 71) Nassau, The Bahamas
- Genres: Funk; pop; disco; R&B
- Occupations: Singer; songwriter
- Instrument: Vocals
- Years active: 1968–2009
- Labels: Apple; Rak; EMI; WEA
- Formerly of: Hot Chocolate
- Website: errolbrown.com

Errol Ainsworth Glenstor Brown MBE (born Lester Errol Brown; 12 November 1943 – 6 May 2015) was a British-Jamaican singer and songwriter, best known as the frontman of the soul and funk band Hot Chocolate. In 2004, Brown received the Ivor Novello Award for his Outstanding Contribution to British Music.

== Career ==
=== Hot Chocolate ===
His break in music came in 1969 when he recorded a version of John Lennon's "Give Peace a Chance" with a band called "Hot Chocolate Band". Unable to change the lyrics without Lennon's permission, he sent a copy to The Beatles' record label, Apple, and the song was released with Lennon's approval.

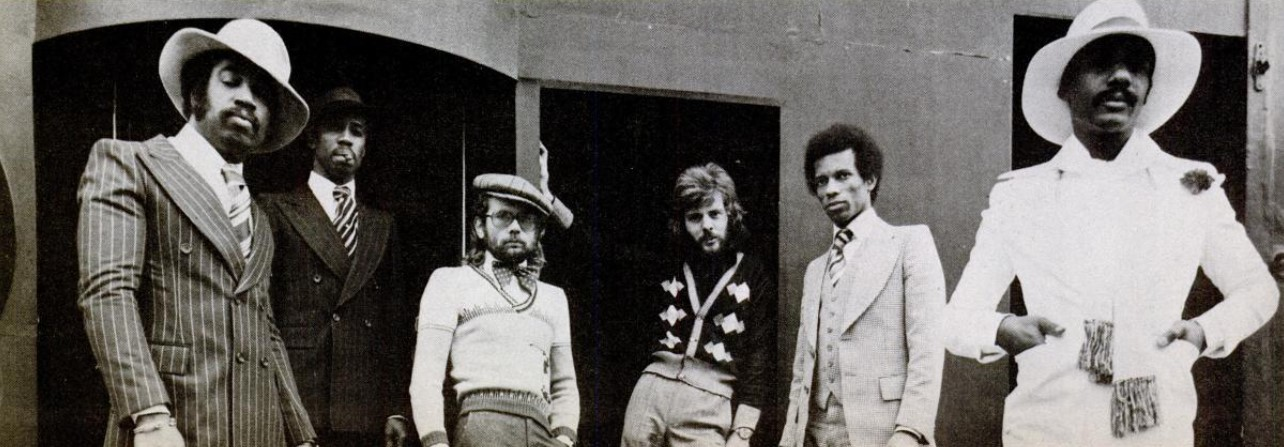
Brown (far right) with Hot Chocolate in 1974.

The Hot Chocolate albums were produced by Mickie Most and recorded at the Rak Records studio. Most of their songs were written by Brown and Hot Chocolate bassist Tony Wilson (before Wilson's departure in 1975), including "Love Is Life", "You Could Have Been a Lady", "Brother Louie", "Emma", and "You Sexy Thing". The band had at least one charting song on the UK singles chart every year from 1970 to 1984.

=== Solo ===
Brown left the group in 1985 to take a hiatus from music. He soon went on to have a solo career, achieving success in the clubs with the 1987 single "Body Rocking", produced by Richard James Burgess.

He was the subject of This Is Your Life in 1997 when he was surprised by Michael Aspel on his birthday.

Brown was a supporter of the Conservative Party and performed at the party's conference in 1984. In 1981, he performed at the wedding reception of Prince Charles and Lady Diana Spencer, at Buckingham Palace.

Brown retired from performing after a farewell tour in 2009.

== Recognition ==
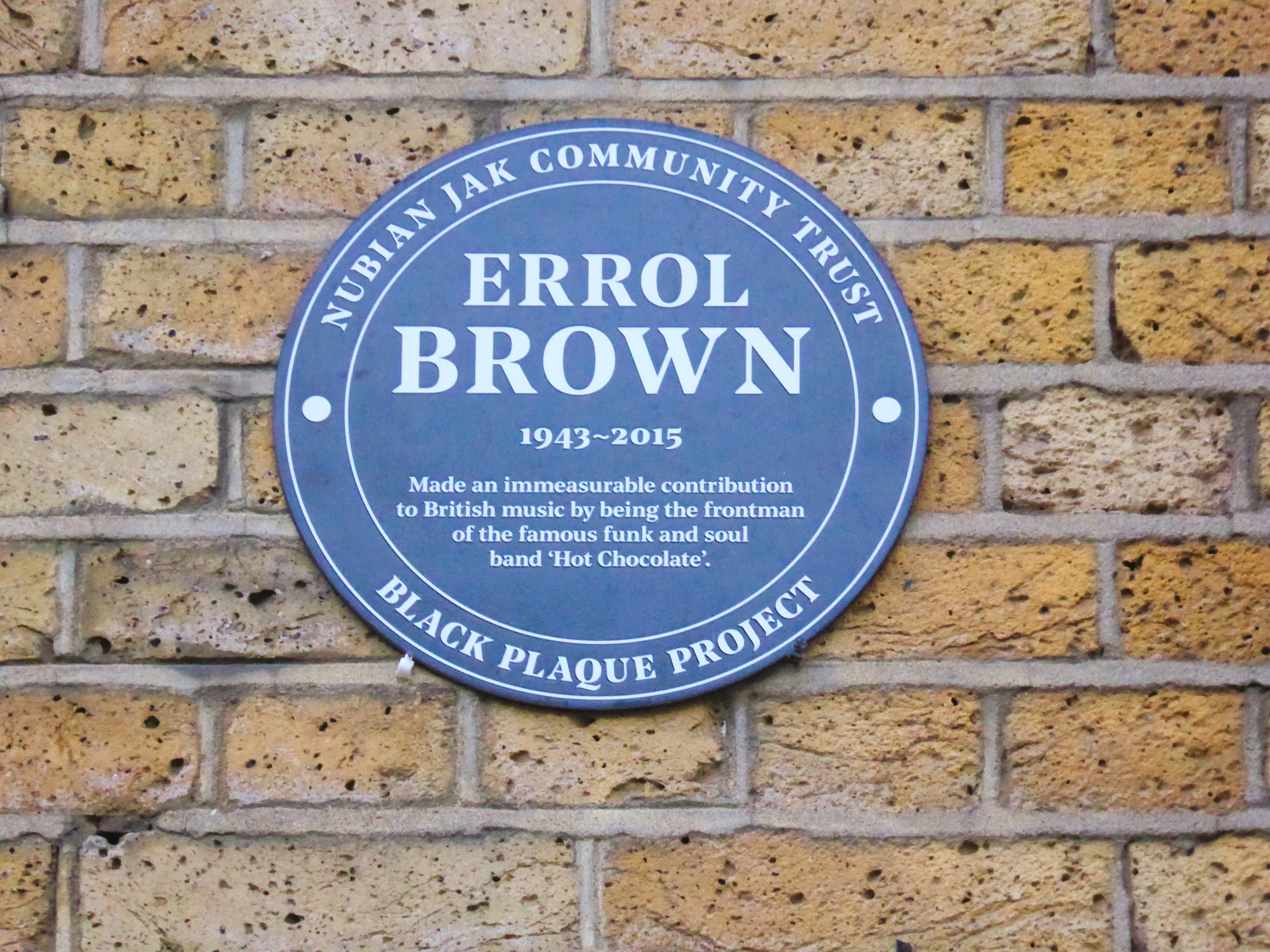
Plaque to Brown in the City of Westminster, England

In 2003, Queen Elizabeth II named Brown a Member of the Order of the British Empire (MBE) for "services to popular music for the United Kingdom". In 2004, he received an Ivor Novello Award for outstanding contributions to British music.

== Personal life and death ==
Brown was born in Kingston, Jamaica, on 12 November 1943, but moved to the Streatham district of south London when he was 11 years old. His father, Ivan, was a police officer, and his mother, Edna, died when Brown was 19 years old. After leaving school, he worked as a clerk.

Brown married Ginette Marie in 1976, and they had two daughters. Brown owned National Hunt racing horses, including Gainsay, who won the Ritz Club Trophy at Cheltenham in 1987.

Brown, known for his signature bald head, first adopted the look after he was encouraged by friends to shave all his hair off as a joke. He liked the way it looked, and remained with a shaven head for the rest of his life.

In 2000, Brown moved to the Caves Village section of Nassau, Bahamas. He died from liver cancer at his home on 6 May 2015, aged 71.

== Discography ==
=== Hot Chocolate ===
- "Give Peace a Chance" (1969)
- "Love Is Life" (1970)
- "You Could Have Been a Lady" (1971)
- "Brother Louie" (1973)
- "Emma" (1974)
- "You Sexy Thing" (1975)
- "I'll Put You Together Again" (1976)
- "So You Win Again" (1977)
- "Every 1's a Winner" (1978)
- "No Doubt About It" (1980)
- "It Started with a Kiss" (1982)
- "I Gave You My Heart" (1983)

=== Solo albums ===
- 1989: That's How Love Is – WEA 243 925
- 1992: Secret Rendezvous – East West 4509-90688
- 1996: Love In This – East West 0630-15260
- 2001: Still Sexy — The Album – Universal Music TV 138162 (UK No.44)

=== Solo singles ===
- 1987: "Personal Touch" – WEA YZ 130 (UK No. 25)
- 1987: "Body Rocking" – WEA YZ 162 (UK No. 51)
- 1988: "Maya" – WEA YZ 313
- 1989: "Love Goes Up and Down" (UK No. 89)
- 1990: "Send a Prayer (To Heaven)" (UK No. 83)
- 1992: "This Time It's Forever" – East West 4509-90064 (Germany No. 26)
- 1992: "Secret Rendezvous" – East West 4509-90913
- 1993: "Emmalene (That's No Lie)" – East West 4509-92322
- 1996: "Ain't No Love in This" – East West 0630-13951
- 1996: "Change the People's Hearts" – East West 0630-16898
- 1998: "It Started with a Kiss"^{1} – EMI CDHOT 101 (UK No. 18)
- 2001: "Still Sexy (Yes U Are)" – Universal 158940 (UK No. 85)
- 2001: "Heaven's in the Back Seat of My Cadillac"
- 2002: "I Love You Everyday" – Universal 0157592

^{1}Credited to Hot Chocolate featuring Errol Brown

== See also ==
- List of lead vocalists
