= Hot Chocolate =

British soul band

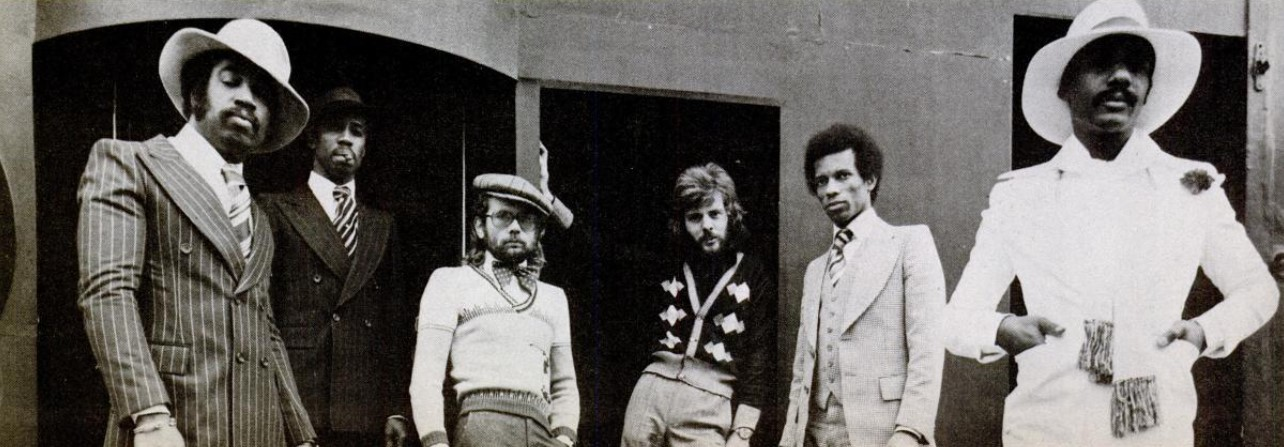
- Hot Chocolate in 1974. Left to right: Patrick Olive, Larry Ferguson, Tony Connor, Harvey Hinsley, Tony Wilson, Errol Brown

Background information
- Also known as: The Hot Chocolate Band
- Origin: West Hampstead, London, England
- Genres: R&B; funk; soul; disco
- Years active: 1968–1986; 1988; 1992–present
- Labels: Rak; EMI; MCA; Apple; WEA; Manticore
- Members: Patrick Olive; Tony Connor; Harvey Hinsley; Steve Ansell; Andy Smith; Kennie Simon
- Past members: Errol Brown; Tony Wilson; Franklyn DeAllie; Jim King; Ian King; Larry Ferguson; Brian Satterwhite; Grant Evelyn; Greg Bannis; Willy Dowling; Steve Matthews; Derek Lewis
- Website: hot-chocolate.co.uk

Hot Chocolate are a British soul band formed by Errol Brown and Tony Wilson. The group had at least one hit song every year on the UK Singles Chart from 1970 to 1984.

Their hits include "You Sexy Thing", a UK number two which also made the top 10 in three decades, reached number three on the US Billboard Hot 100 and number five in Canada, and also featured in the film The Full Monty (1997); "So You Win Again", which topped the UK Charts; "Every 1's a Winner" which reached number five in Canada and number six in the US; "It Started with a Kiss", which reached the UK top five, and "Emma", which charted at number three in the UK, number five in Canada, and number 8 in the US. In 2004, Brown received the Ivor Novello Award for Outstanding Contribution to British Music from the British Academy of Songwriters, Composers and Authors.

== Beginnings ==
Formed in 1968, the band initially consisted of lead vocalist Errol Brown, bassist Tony Wilson, percussionist Patrick Olive, guitarist Franklyn De Allie, and drummer Jim King (shortly thereafter replaced by the unrelated Ian King) with keyboardist Larry Ferguson joining the band in the following year. The band was originally named Hot Chocolate Band by Mavis Smith, who worked for the Apple Corps press office. This was quickly amended, first to The Hot Chocolate and then to Hot Chocolate, by Mickie Most. By 1970, the band's line-up had changed again to include Harvey Hinsley and Tony Connor (who was also a member of Audience at the time) replacing De Allie and King respectively.

Hot Chocolate started their recording career making a reggae version of John Lennon's "Give Peace a Chance", but frontman Errol Brown was told he needed permission. He was contacted by Apple Records, discovered that Lennon liked his version, and the group was subsequently signed to Apple Records. The link was short-lived as the Beatles were starting to break up, and the Apple connection soon ended.

Later in 1970, Hot Chocolate, with the help of record producer Mickie Most, began releasing tracks that became hits, such as "Love Is Life", "Emma", "You Could Have Been a Lady" (a US and Canadian hit for April Wine), and "I Believe in Love". All those releases were on the Rak record label, owned by Most. Brown and bassist Tony Wilson wrote most of their original material, and also provided hits for Herman's Hermits, "Bet Yer Life I Do", for Julie Felix, "Heaven Is Here", and for Mary Hopkin, "Think About Your Children".

Gradually the band started to become UK Singles Chart regulars. One of the hits from this period, "Brother Louie", featured a guest spoken vocal from Alexis Korner.

== Success ==
Hot Chocolate became a big success in the disco era of the mid-1970s. A combination of high production standards, the growing confidence of the main songwriting team of Wilson and Brown, and tight vocal harmonies enabled them to secure further big hits such as "You Sexy Thing" and "Every 1's a Winner", which were also US hits, peaking at No. 3 (1976) and No. 6 (1979), respectively. After Wilson's departure for a solo career, that included a 1976 album I Like Your Style, Brown assumed all songwriting duties. Wilson was initially replaced by Brian Satterwhite, until Satterwhite departed the band and Olive switched to bass as his primary instrument.

In 1977, after 15 hits, they finally reached number one with "So You Win Again". It was one of the few of their recordings that was not written, at least partly, by Brown The track was a Russ Ballard composition.

The band became the only group, and one of just three acts, that had a hit in every year of the 1970s in the UK charts (the other two being Elvis Presley and Diana Ross). The band eventually had at least one hit, every year, between 1970 and 1984.

The band continued well into the 1980s, and clocked up another big hit record, "It Started with a Kiss", in 1982, which reached number 5 in the UK. In all, the group charted 25 UK top 40 hit singles. Their single "You Sexy Thing" became the only track that made British top ten status in the 1970s, 1980s and 1990s.

In 1987, Dutch DJ and producer Ben Liebrand made remixes of the Hot Chocolate hits; "You Sexy Thing" and "Every 1's a Winner". Liebrand also made a combination remix of those two hits called "Two in a Bed" for the exclusive Disco Mix Club.

== Later years ==
Renewed interest in Hot Chocolate came in part with the band's appearances on a string of successful film soundtracks, starting with the 1997 comedy The Full Monty, as well as in a 1989 Clearasil acne lotion commercial (featuring a young Patsy Palmer). From the late 1980s onwards, the group experienced a resurgence of credibility: Urge Overkill, PJ Harvey and the Sisters of Mercy all added Hot Chocolate songs to their live sets, and Cud's cover of "You Sexy Thing" featured in John Peel's Festive 50 in 1987.

Errol Brown and Larry Ferguson departed the band in 1986, ultimately leading the group to disband. Brown then began a solo career. Two of his singles made the UK Singles Chart – "Personal Touch" and "Body Rockin'". Hot Chocolate had a hit in 1988 in Germany. "Never Pretend" was written by Harvey Hinsley and Susan Stuttard, and the vocalist was Grant Evelyn. The band's enduring popularity was verified when two compilation albums both reached No. 1 in the UK Albums Chart (see below). In 2003, Errol Brown received the MBE; and in 2004, the Ivor Novello Award for his contribution to British music.

In 1992, the band reformed with new vocalist Greg Bannis and keyboardists Steve Ansell, Andy Smith, Willy Dowling, and Steve Matthews (the latter two of whom departed the band in 1994), and manager and agent Ric Martin took control over the band's bookings and live appearances. Kennie Simon took over lead vocals in 2010 following the departure of Bannis and Hot Chocolate continue to make live appearances in the UK and Europe.

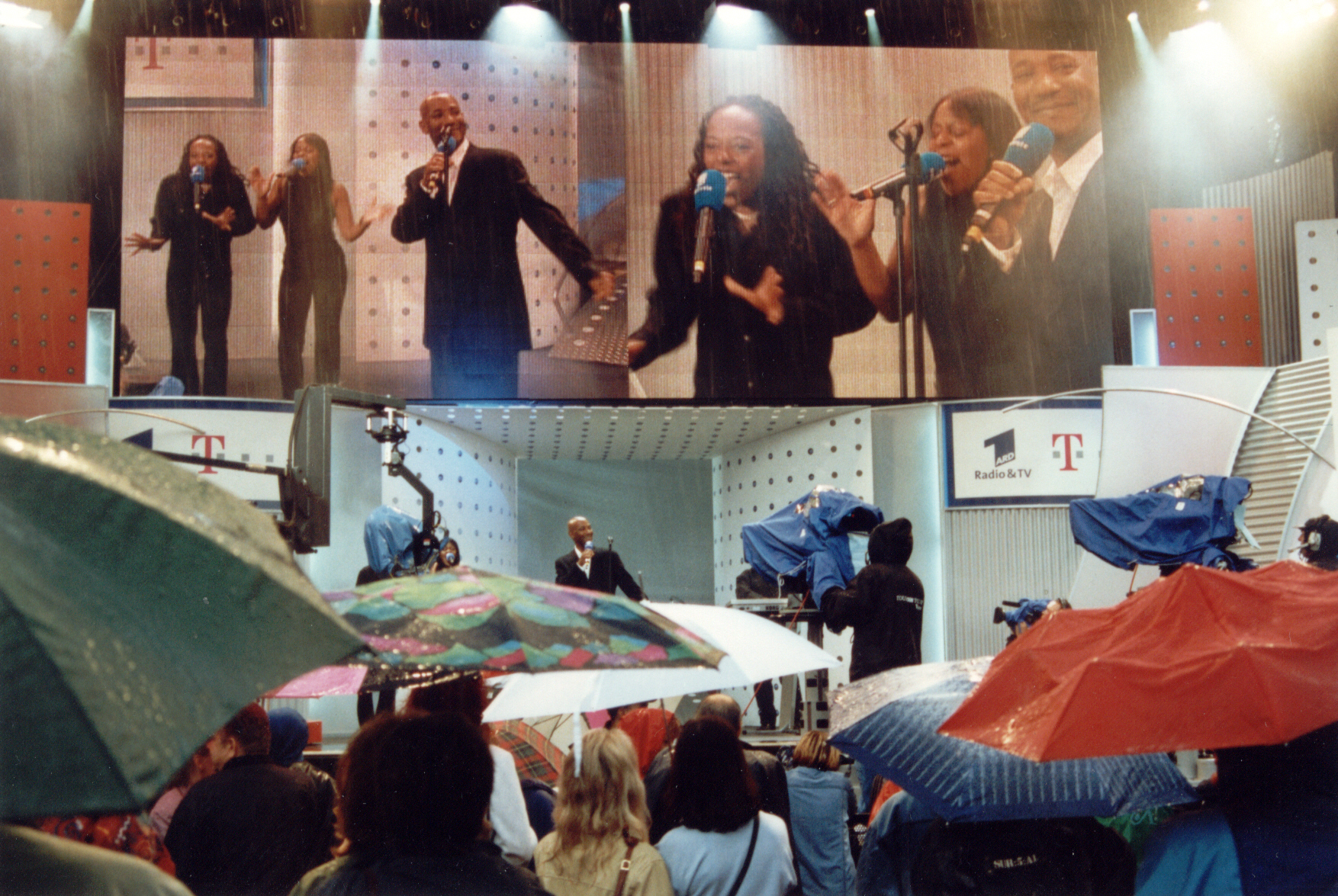
Errol Brown performing on stage in 1998

On 6 May 2015, original frontman and principal songwriter Errol Brown died from liver cancer. He was 71.

Original guitarist Franklyn Delano De Allie (born 21 January 1944, St. Marks Parish, Grenada, West Indies) later became a police officer, and died in Warwick, Bermuda on 30 December 2018.

Keyboardist Steve Matthews died on 29 August 2025.

== Personnel ==
=== Members ===
Principal members of the band that played on most hit records are Errol Brown, Tony Wilson, Patrick Olive, Larry Ferguson, Harvey Hinsley, and Tony Connor.

Current members

- Patrick Olive – percussion (1968–1975), bass (1975–1984, 1988, 1992–present)
- Tony Connor – drums, percussion (1970–1986, 1988, 1992–present)
- Harvey Hinsley – guitars (1970–1986, 1988, 1992–present)
- Steve Ansell – keyboards, guitars (1994–present)
- Andy Smith – keyboards (1994–present)
- Kennie Simon – lead vocals, keyboards (2010–present)

Former members

- Errol Brown – lead vocals (1968–1986; died 2015)
- Tony Wilson – bass, lead & backing vocals (1968–1975; died 2026)
- Franklyn De Allie – guitars (1968–1970; died 2018)
- Jim King – drums, percussion (1968–1969)
- Ian King – drums, percussion (1969–1970)
- Larry Ferguson – keyboards (1969–1986)
- Derek Lewis – percussion, backing vocals (1975)
- Brian Satterwhite – bass, backing vocals (1975)
- Rick Green – keyboards (1975)
- Chris Cameron – keyboards, backing vocals (1982–1985)
- Grant Evelyn – lead vocals (1988)
- Greg Bannis – lead vocals (1992–2010)
- Willy Dowling – keyboards, backing vocals (1992–1994)
- Steve Matthews – keyboards, backing vocals (1992–1994; died 2025)

=== Line-ups ===
1968–1969	1969–1970	1970–1975	1975
Errol Brown – lead vocals; Tony Wilson – bass, vocals; Patrick Olive – percussion; Franklyn De Allie – guitars; Jim King – drums, percussion	Errol Brown – lead vocals; Tony Wilson – bass, vocals; Patrick Olive – percussion; Franklyn De Allie – guitars; Larry Ferguson – keyboards; Ian King – drums, percussion	Errol Brown – lead vocals; Tony Wilson – bass, lead vocals; Patrick Olive – percussion; Larry Ferguson – keyboards; Tony Connor – drums, percussion; Harvey Hinsley – guitars	Errol Brown – lead vocals; Patrick Olive – percussion; Larry Ferguson – keyboards; Tony Connor – drums, percussion; Harvey Hinsley – guitars; Brian Satterwhite – bass, backing vocals; Derek Lewis – percussion, backing vocals
1975–1986	1986–1988	1988	1988–1992
Errol Brown – lead vocals; Patrick Olive – bass; Larry Ferguson – keyboards; Tony Connor – drums, percussion; Harvey Hinsley – guitars	Disbanded	Patrick Olive – bass; Tony Connor – drums, percussion; Harvey Hinsley – guitars; Grant Evelyn – lead vocals	Disbanded
1992–1994	1994–2010	2010–present
Patrick Olive – bass; Tony Connor – drums, percussion; Harvey Hinsley – guitars; Greg Bannis – lead vocals; Willie Dowling – keyboards, backing vocals; Steve Matthews – keyboards, backing vocals	Patrick Olive – bass; Tony Connor – drums, percussion; Harvey Hinsley – guitars; Steve Ansell – keyboards, guitars; Greg Bannis – lead vocals; Andy Smith – keyboards	Patrick Olive – bass; Tony Connor – drums, percussion; Harvey Hinsley – guitars; Steve Ansell – keyboards, guitars; Andy Smith – keyboards; Kennie Simon – lead vocals, keyboards

== Discography ==
- Cicero Park (1974)
- Hot Chocolate (1975)
- Man to Man (1976)
- Every 1's a Winner (1978)
- Going Through the Motions (1979)
- Class (1980)
- Mystery (1982)
- Love Shot (1983)
- Strictly Dance (1993)
