= That's the Way I Like It: The Best of Dead or Alive =

Greatest hits album by Dead or Alive
- Released: 25 October 2010
- Label: Sony Music Entertainment
- Producer: Stock Aitken Waterman; Zeus B. Held; Dead or Alive

Dead or Alive chronology
Evolution: The Hits (2003)	That's the Way I Like It: The Best of Dead or Alive (2010)	Sophisticated Boom Box MMXVI (2016)

Professional ratings
Review scores
Source	Rating
AllMusic	4/5 stars

That's the Way I Like It: The Best of Dead or Alive is the third greatest hits album by English pop band Dead or Alive, released in 2010. It is the last release by Dead or Alive before lead singer Pete Burns died in 2016; the box set Sophisticated Boom Box MMXVI was released just five days after his death.

== Track listing ==
1. "You Spin Me Round (Like a Record)" – from Youthquake
2. "That's the Way I Like It" (7" version) – from Sophisticated Boom Boom
3. "Lover Come Back to Me" – from Youthquake
4. "In Too Deep" (7" remix) – from Youthquake
5. "My Heart Goes Bang (Get Me to the Doctor)" (7" version) – original version from Youthquake
6. "Brand New Lover" (Single edit) – from Mad, Bad, and Dangerous to Know
7. "Something in My House" (7" remix) – from Mad, Bad, and Dangerous to Know
8. "Hooked on Love" – from Mad, Bad, and Dangerous to Know
9. "I'll Save You All My Kisses" (Remix) – from Mad, Bad, and Dangerous to Know
10. "Turn Around and Count 2 Ten" – from Nude
11. "Come Home with Me Baby" – from Nude
12. "Misty Circles" (7" version) – from Sophisticated Boom Boom
13. "What I Want" (Original 7" version) – from Sophisticated Boom Boom
14. "I'd Do Anything" (7" version) – from Sophisticated Boom Boom
15. "Lover Come Back to Me" (Extended remix)
16. "My Heart Goes Bang" (American "Wipe-Out" Mix – short)
17. "Something in My House" (Mortevicar Mix)
18. "You Spin Me Round (Like a Record)" (Murder Mix)

== Personnel ==
Adapted from AllMusic.

- Matt Aitken – producer
- Jay Burnett – engineer, re-recording
- Pete Burns – composer, producer
- Harry Wayne "K.C." Casey – composer
- Steve Coy – producer
- Dead or Alive – composer, primary artist, producer, remixing
- Phil Harding – remixing
- Zeus B. Held – producer, remixing
- Mike Stock – producer
