= Come Home With Me Baby =

Single by Dead or Alive

from the album Nude
- B-side: "I'll Save You All My Kisses": "I Want You"
- Released: May 17, 1989
- Studio: Good Earth Studios, London
- Genre: Synth-pop, dance-pop, hi-NRG
- Length: 3:48; 6:20 (12" version)
- Label: Epic Records
- Songwriter: Pete Burns
- Producer: Dead Or Alive

Dead or Alive singles chronology
"Turn Around And Count 2 Ten" (1988)	"Come Home With Me Baby" (1989)	"Baby Don't Say Goodbye" (1989)

"Come Home With Me Baby" is a song by the English pop band Dead or Alive, released as the second single from their fourth studio album Nude on May 17, 1989. Although the track followed its predecessor "Turn Around and Count 2 Ten" in terms of lukewarm success in their native United Kingdom, it saw major success on the US Dance Club chart, becoming their second of two number-one hits.

== Release and promotion ==
"Come Home With Me Baby" was released on May 17, 1989 as the second single from Nude in the UK and Japan, and the album's lead single in the US. The single was backed with two tracks from the band's third studio album Mad, Bad, and Dangerous to Know; previous a-side "I'll Save You All My Kisses", and "I Want You". Both "Come Home With Me Baby" and "I Want You" were remixed for the single's release; the former also being re-recorded and mixed by Jay Burnett.

To promote the single, Epic Records released two separate twelve-inch singles of the track; the first being an extended version of Burnett's single mix, and the second a remix by Rique 'Billy Bob' Alonso and Miami-based DJ Lewis A. Martinee.

The single's sleeve was designed by frequent visual collaborator Andie Airfix for Satori, who previously designed the sleeves for many Dead or Alive releases, including those for the Youthquake and Mad, Bad, and Dangerous to Know albums.

== Music video ==
The music video for "Come Home With Me Baby" was seen by frontman Pete Burns as "freedom" from the commercial and merely promotional nature of the band's prior music videos. In his foreword to the band's 2003 video compilation Evolution: The Videos, Burns recalls the making of the "Come Home With Me Baby" video in the wake of Epic's objections to the video for Something In My House:

It seems to me that it was perfectly acceptable for a female artist to be a bit "cheeky," but another thing altogether for somebody with my "disabilities" or "dubious sexuality" to even wink at a camera! Of course by now I was "in on the joke" and if I couldn't be myself, what was the point anyway? And, as there [were] still budgets available I did just that... within reason... So, by the time we got to "Come Home With Me Baby" I was off and running... freedom... and it felt great. Of course if a video's success is judged by the amount of times it is on TV, by that time I was in commercial Siberia! But I never liked hot places anyway.

The video was promotionally serviced in two iterations: the standard video, and a re-edited version for club play utilising the song's twelve-inch remix. The latter was commercially released on Evolution: The Videos.

== Chart performance ==
In the UK, "Come Home With Me Baby" saw a slight upturn in chart success for the band following "Turn Around and Count 2 Ten", peaking at #62 and charting for three weeks. The song's low chart placement was subsequently attributed to the track's lyrical content; its subject of casual sex was seen as untimely due to the prevalence of the AIDS epidemic. Despite slow sales at home, the track was a great success in clubs in the US, and peaked at number one on both the Billboard Dance Club Songs and Dance Singles Sales chart in August 1989, the latter due to particularly strong twelve-inch sales. Despite this, the song's minor success on the Billboard Hot 100 was allegedly stunted by Epic Records, whom "objected to the male dancers in the music video." In Japan, "Come Home With Me Baby" peaked at number one, the second of two chart-toppers from Nude in the territory.

== Critical reception ==
In the August 5, 1989 issue of Melody Maker, Steve Sutherland described "Come Home With Me Baby" as "strutting" and "pirouetting the thin line between immorality and amorality," and commented on its poor UK chart performance, highlighting the track as "a brutally honest (some would say cynical) pick-up song – bold to the point of controversy in a climate of AIDS paranoia. [...] Little wonder why Radio 1 have seen fit to pretend it doesn't exist."

== Personnel ==
Dead or Alive

- Pete Burns – lyrics, producer, mixer, composer
- Steve Coy – producer, mixer, composer

Production and artwork

- Jay Burnett – recorded by, engineer, mixer
- Andy Stennet – additional keyboards
- Rique 'Billy Bob' Alonso – additional production, remix (the "Deadhouse dub")
- Lewis A. Martinee – additional production, remix supervisor (the "Deadhouse dub")
- Peter Brown – photography
- Pierre Chand – photography
- John McKitterick – design
- Andie Arifix – artwork and design

== Track listing ==
7" single (1989, Epic, BURNS 5)

1. Come Home With Me Baby 3:48
2. I'll Save You All My Kisses 3:28

12" single (1989, Epic, BURNS T5)

1. Come Home With Me Baby (12" version) 6:20
2. I'll Save You All My Kisses 3:28
3. I Want You 4:05

12" single (1989, Epic, BURNS Q5)

1. Come Home With Me Baby (The Deadhouse dub) 6:24
2. Come Home With Me Baby (The Deadhouse 7" edit) 3:30
3. Come Home With Me Baby 3:48

CD single (1989, Epic, BURNS C5)

1. Come Home With Me Baby 3:48
2. Come Home With Me Baby (12" version) 6:20
3. Come Home With Me Baby (The Deadhouse dub) 6:24

== Charts ==
Chart (1989)	Peak position
Australia (Australian Music Report)	45
Japan (Oricon)	1
UK Singles (Official Charts)	62
US Billboard Hot 100	69
US Dance Club Songs (Billboard)	1
US Dance Singles Sales (Billboard)	1

== See also ==
- List of artists who reached number one on the U.S. Dance Club Songs chart
