= Massive Ego =

British darkwave band

Background information
- Origin: United Kingdom
- Genres: Electronic, darkwave, gothic, romo
- Years active: 1996–2022, 2024–present
- Label: Out of Line Music
- Members: Marc Massive; Oliver Frost; Lloyd Price; Porl Young
- Past members: Andy J Thirwall; Stuart 'Barnaby' Moffatt; Dan Black; Eddie Orange Dasher (Steady); Dean Bright; Scot Collins
- Website: massiveego.co.uk

Massive Ego is a British darkwave musical group formed in 1996 by singer Marc Massive (also the owner of the Public Disordar label) and Andy J Thirwall. The band has changed its sound and image since its formation. The original releases being mostly covers in a Eurodance, Hi-NRG style. Massive and Thirwall later parted ways, and Massive searched for a new musical direction for the band. Collaborations with Empire State Human and Lia Organa & Electric Prince were the start of a darker sound for the band. The band joined alternative German label Out of Line Music in 2015 with the line-up; Marc Massive, Oliver Frost, Lloyd Price and Scot Collins. Their debut album for Out of Line was released on 17 February 2017. The current themes of the songs centre around the darker side of life, depression and anxiety, death, suicide, love, sex and vampirism.

In March 2022, Massive Ego announced that they were breaking up due to "health issues and personal circumstances." Later reforming in 2024, with Marc joined by Olly, Lloyd and Porl.

== History ==
=== Formation and Nite Klub Skewl (1996–2010) ===
Massive Ego was formed in 1996 with original band members; Marc Massive and Andy J Thirwall. Fronting the band from the start, ex-model and dancer for Boy George's 90s band Jesus Loves You and MC Kinky. Marc joined Ezee Possee as a dancer, before they released their single Everything Starts with an 'E' on Boy George's small independent label, More Protein. Marc went on to DJ and co-curate London's ACT ART events for several years. Dan Black and Stuart 'Barnaby' Moffatt joined the band's line-up in the same year. The band performed their first live gig in January 1996 at Club Skinny at HQ's in Camden, the latter featuring a young Dan Black on guitar. one of two clubnights, along with Arcadia in Soho, which formed the core of the Romo scene. On 12 October, Massive Ego were featured on the cover of Boyz magazine.

In 1997, You Think You're a Man a Hi-NRG cover of Divine, was released as the band's debut single. In 1997 and '98, they performed at Summer Rites Fest in Brockwell Park, Brixton. Planet Earth was the second single, released in 1999, a cover of Duran Duran. September 2000 saw the band playing their first Pride festival in Nottingham.

2002 saw Steady (Eddie Orange Dasher) join the band on keyboards. Steady had previously been in Leigh Bowery's band Minty, The Offset, as well as his own bands Elizabeth Bunny and Sweetie. A third single; My Heart Goes Bang (Get Me to the Doctor) (vs. Miss Dusty 'O') a Dead Or Alive cover, was released later that year. A radio edit of unreleased track, Murder, was the b-side to the single, and featured Steady on guitars as well as synths. Dean Bright (ex-Dead Or Alive) also joined the band that year. Bright was also a fashion designer, whose credits included the purple coat worn by Pete Burns in both the video for You Spin Me Round (Like a Record) and on the cover of the album Youthquake.

Oliver Frost joined the band in 2004, on keyboards. Massive Ego played Brighton Pride in the same year.

In 2005, Steady committed suicide. The song Low Life was later written as a dedication to his memory.

The long-awaited debut album, Nite Klub Skewl was released in 2007, which included all three of the previously released singles. The album consisted mostly of covers, but also had original songs, such as Murder, Fight the Feeling, Wrecked and Nite Klub Skewl.

On 13 March 2009 the compilation Master & Servant was released. It featured eleven of twelve tracks from Nite Klub Skewl plus three new tracks, including the single Sex Drive, the second Dead Or Alive cover released as a single, on 30 October later that year.

Massive Ego played Pride London in 2010.

=== Collaborations and change of direction (2011–2014) ===
In 2011, Massive began searching for a new musical direction for the band, and released the single I Idolize You, written by Massive & Thirwall. It marked a darker electronic and industrial sound. Lyrically the title track of the single was a complete departure from their previous releases, and centred around the darker side of fame.

In 2012, Massive began collaborating with Irish electronic band, Empire State Human. A cover of Hazel O'Connor's Eighth Day was released digitally on Halloween, later that year, with a music video to promote the single. All profits were donated to F.R.I.E.N.D a farmed animal sanctuary in Kent, UK.

2013 saw Massive collaborating with Belgian duo Lia Organa & Electric Prince writing and performing vocals on their track Dead Silence, released on 28 February via Black Leather Records. Two digital singles were released via the Bandcamp site; Devil in Disguise (Originally released on the I Idolize You single) and the previously unreleased, I Like Boys (Lia Organa & Electric Prince Remix), both on 9 July.

2014 saw the first collaboratorive release with Empire State Human, Sound of the Download was released as a digital single on Massive's own independent label, Public Disordar Records on 4 February. This release saw Massive venturing into the Britpop genre. On 25 August, a second collaboration single with Empire State Human was released. Animal Rights Human Wrongs was a modern take on the 'animal rights song', with proceeds going to the charities, Saving strays in Sarajevo and The Mayhew Animal Home in the UK. The track Generation V was released on the compilation Fuel For the Machine.

On 20 October, a new EP was released. Low Life was a release of further collaborations with Empire State Human featuring vocals by Maggie K DeMonde of Scarlet Fantastic as well as remixes. A video was released of the title track for the EP.

Massive Ego played Brighton Pride again.

=== Signing to Out of Line and Beautiful Suicide (2015–2022) ===
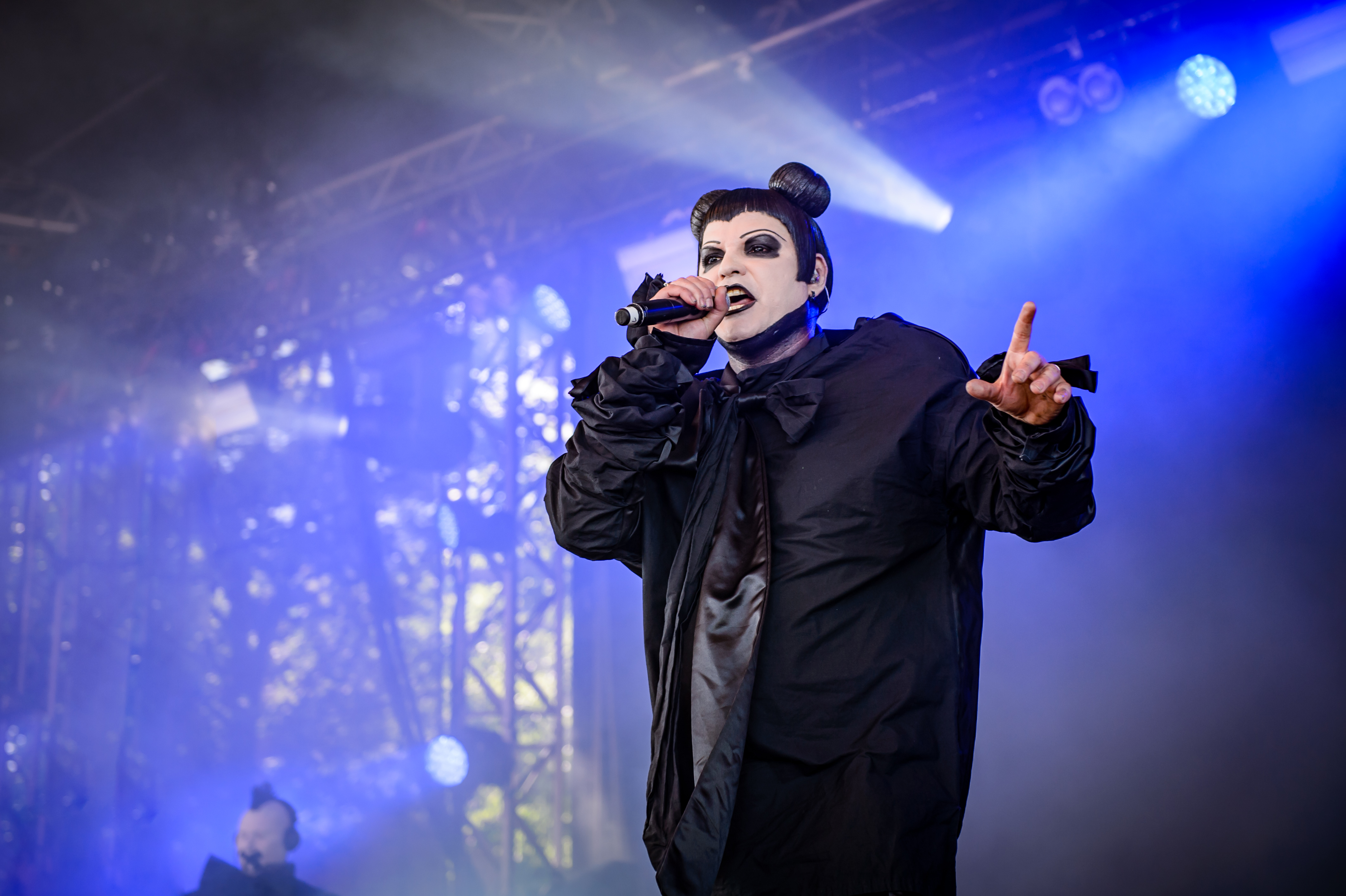
Marc Massive in 2017

Marc continued to look for a darker sound for the band, and after the Modification remix done by Lloyd Price (ex-Sigue Sigue Sputnik) for the I Idolize You single in 2011, he joined the band in 2015 on keyboards and programming. An EP was put together for release through the band's new label, Out of Line Music. Before the release of the new EP, the Modification Edit of I Idolize You was released on Out of Line's Electrostorm Vol. 6, Marking it as the first official release on the new label. Noise in the Machine was released on 24 July 2015. It featured remixes of I Idolize You, Dead Silence, Generation V and Low Life, from The Frixion, Lloyd's side project, Aesthetic Perfection and Leæther Strip. Two music videos were released to promote the EP; I Idolize You (Modification Edit) and Dead Silence Rising (Frixion Mix) Scot Collins joined the band on keyboards and programming, later in 2015, and they began work on a new album, which was recorded throughout 2016.

The new line-up performed their first live gig together at London's Electrowerkz on 30 January 2016. In the new line-up, Frost moved from keyboards to percussion. They performed new tracks from their EP, as well as tracks from their upcoming new album. Two new tracks were later released; Drag Me in, Drag Me Under on the Out of Line compilation series Electrostorm Vol. 7 and Out of Line on the Electronic Saviours compilation series Electronic Saviors: Industrial Music to Cure Cancer Vol. 4. On 20 May, the Mat Pop remix of Reigning in the Machines was released via bandcamp, with all profits being donated to Norton Animal Rescue Foundation set up by Gary Edwards in 2010. The band performed at the Out of Line Weekender 2016, opened for Blutengel at their Nemesis Open Air Festival, and at Infest Festival. Their last performance of the year saw the band return to Elektrowerkz on 10 September.

On 1 December, Massive and Collins both contributed to a track by multimedia artist Christo on her single Malfunctioning Me. With Massive contributing lyrics and vocals, and Collins adding synths and electronic guitar. 2 December 2016 saw the release of BlutEngel's single Complete which featured the Massive Ego remix of the title track. It was lead single from their 10th album, Leitbild.

The title of the new album was announced in a Christmas message from the band through their social media accounts. Beautiful Suicide was released on 17 February 2017. Featured vocalists include Chris Pohl (BlutEngel), Maggie K DeMonde (Scarlet Fantastic), German gothic rapper Belzebub and Gene Serene (The Frixion). Photography for the album was done by 80's photographer David Levine.

The Beautiful Suicide version of Low Life was featured on the Out of Line compilation, Electrostorm Vol. 8. This is the third consecutive feature on the compilation series. In April and May, they supported BlutEngel on their Leitbild tour. They also performed at Amphi Festival and Wave Gothic Treffen 2017. Later in the year they played Whitby Goth Weekend and the second half of the Leitbild tour.

On 9 November, the band released an official statement on their website and through social media, that Lloyd parted ways with the band, due to work and family commitments.

In 2018, the band supported Covenant as part of their UK tour in March. In April, they returned to Whitby to headline. Later in 2018, they played again at the Out of Line Weekender, and M'era Luna Festival. To celebrate a year since the release of Beautiful Suicide, the band released Nothing But A Void via their Bandcamp page. It featured two previously unreleased tracks from the album's recording sessions. Later, in September they supported Solar Fake, and entered the studio to record the follow-up to Beautiful Suicide. And in December they headlined their A Black xMassive show in London.

The new album's title was revealed in February 2019 as, Church For the Malfunctioned. Massive Ego began their support of BlutEngel in the same month on the first half of their Un:Gott Tour. In March, the album was made available for pre-order, which revealed the release date of 26 April, and the track My Religion is Dark was made available to buy via iTunes. Digital Heroin was released 12 April with an accompanying video.

In January 2020, Massive Ego went on a double headliner tour with labelmates Ashbury Heights. During the COVID-19 pandemic touring was cancelled for various festivals including Plage Noir, Out of Line Weekender and Castle Party. With being unable to tour, they collaborated with BlutEngel on a new single called, Nothing But A Void, released on Friday 13 November. Massive Ego was also featured on Ashbury Heights' song One Trick Pony, released in late March 2021.

In September 2021, they played HRH Goth Festival, their first show since the pandemic. Featuring 3 new songs from the upcoming EP The New Normal, including the single You Will Comply which was released 1 October. The band line-up changed with the live performance, reintroducing Lloyd Price after the departure of Scot Collins. As of January 2022, former Rosetta Stone member Porl Young has joined the band line-up.

=== Comeback (2024) ===
In 2024, Massive Ego announced their reformation with a comeback performance at Out of Line Weekender festival 2024. During the performance on 2 May, they announced their upcoming single called In Your Own Darkness. As well as showcasing the new fuller live sound and image of the band, having moved on from the recognisable trademark make-up and 'Mickey Mouse' geisha hair style, in favour of a more grounded and gimmick free look going forward. On May 8th 2026, They released their third album on Out of Line called Symphony of Flies.

== Band name ==
It was a kind of juxtaposition to the anxiety-ridden reality of myself. It was meant to be a mickey-take of what I was really like as a person. In hindsight, I probably wouldn't have called it that now but after 20+ years, it's a bit late to change. I think the lack of confidence is why I like to dress up, wear make-up and generally express myself through the look.

— Interview with Marc Massive: Whitby Gazette

The name of the band was thought up by Marc, as an ironic wordplay on his personality, compared to what was expected of him as having been a model. Seeing how most models, with being in the public eye, were focused on their image and how they portrayed themselves as being larger than life. With most buying into their own hyped up personas, and developing an ego that matched who they had convinced themselves that they were.

== Line-up ==
=== Current members ===
- Marc Massive – lyrics, vocals (1996–2022, 2024–present)
- Oliver Frost – percussion (2004–2022, 2024–present)
- Lloyd Price – keyboards, programming, music (2015–2017, 2021–2022, 2024–present)
- Porl Young – Guitar, programming, music (2022, 2024–present)

=== Former members ===
- Andy J Thirwall – keyboards, programming, music (1996–2000)
- Stuart 'Barnaby' Moffatt – bass (1996–1997)
- Dan Black – guitar (1996–1997)
- Eddie Orange Dasher (Steady) – keyboards, guitar (2002–2005)
- Dean Bright – keyboards (2002–2005)
- Scot Collins – keyboards, programming, music (2015–2021)

== Discography ==
=== Albums ===
- 2006: Nite Klub Skewl
- 2017: Beautiful Suicide
- 2019: Church for the Malfunctioned
- 2026: Symphony of Flies

=== Compilations ===
- 2009: Master & Servant

=== EPs ===
- 2014: Low Life
- 2015: Noise in the Machine
- 2018: Nothing But A Void
- 2022: The New Normal

=== Singles ===
- 1997: "You Think You're a Man!" (Divine cover)
- 1999: "Planet Earth" (Duran Duran cover)
- 2002: "My Heart Goes Bang (Get Me to the Doctor)" (vs. Miss Dusty 'O') (Dead or Alive cover)
- 2009: "Sex Drive" (Dead or Alive cover) (iTunes digital single)
- 2011: "I Idolize You"
- 2012: "Eighth Day (Hazel O'Connor cover)"
- 2013: "Dead Silence" (Lia Organa & Electric Prince feat. Marc Massive)
- 2013: "I Like Boys (Lia Organa & Electric Prince Remix)" (Bandcamp digital single)
- 2013: "Devil in Disguise" (Bandcamp digital single)
- 2014: "Sound of the Download"
- 2014: "Animal Rights, Human Wrongs"
- 2016: "Reining in the Machines (Matt Pop Remix)" (Bandcamp digital single)
- 2016: "Malfunctioning Me" (with Christo)
- 2019: "Digital Heroin"
- 2020: "Nothing but a Void" (with BlutEngel)
- 2021: "You Will Comply"
- 2021: "Dead Eyes Black"
- 2024: "In Your Own Darkness"
- 2025: "(My) Death Song"
- 2025: "Hit the Kerb Running"
- 2025: "Man Become Monster"
- 2026: "Broken Tomorrow" (feat. Boy George)

=== Music videos ===
| Year | Video | Director |
|---|---|---|
| 2006 | "Supernature" | Oliver Frost & Marc Massive |
| 2009 | "Planet Earth (Jewels & Stone Edit)" | Gaz Reynolds |
| 2009 | "Master and Servant (Lia Organa & Electric Prince Remix)" | Frost & Massive; Suka Off |
| 2011 | "I Idolize You" | Frost & Massive; Bambi Fantastic |
| 2012 | "Eighth Day" | Frost & Massive |
| 2013 | "Dead Silence (Lia Organa & Electric Prince feat. Marc Massive)" | Frost & Massive; Suka Off |
| 2014 | "Sound of the Download" | Tachyons; Logan Owlbeemoth |
| 2014 | "Low Life" (with Empire State Human) | Massive & Anonymous |
| 2015 | "I Idolize You (Modification Edit)" | Bambi Fantastic & Massive Ego |
| 2016 | "Dead Silence Rising (Frixion Mix)" | Frost & Massive; Suka Off |
| 2017 | "Low Life" | Massive & Anonymous |
| 2017 | "Let Go" | Manic Molecule |
| 2019 | "Digital Heroin" | Massive Ego & Anonymous |
| 2021 | "Nothing but a Void" with BlutEngel | Sven Friedrich & Anonymous |
| 2021 | "You Will Comply" | Massive Ego |
| 2021 | "Dead Eyes Black" | Javier Gallego Escutia |
| 2024 | "In Your Own Darkness" | Marc Massive & Nick Courcoux |
| 2025 | "(My) Death Song" | Frost + Massive |
| 2025 | "Hit the Kerb Running" | Frost + Massive |
| 2025 | "Man Become Monster" | Frost + Massive |
| 2026 | "Broken Tomorrow feat. Boy George" | Frost + Massive & Dean Stockings |

=== Remixes ===
| Title | Year | Artist | Album |
|---|---|---|---|
| "Nein" | 2016 | Ost+Front | Ultra – Das Dritte Ohr (Intepretationen befreundeter Künstler) |
| "Dance with Your Own Skeletons" | 2016 | Nature of Wires | Cyber Rendezvous (Remixed) |
| "Elated" (feat. Shiv-R) | 2016 | Benjamin'sPlague | Elated (single) |
| "Murder Fantasies" | 2016 | Chrom | Peak & Decay |
| "Eisengott" | 2016 | Rummelsnuff | Rummelsnuff & Asbach |
| "Complete" | 2016 | BlutEngel | Complete (single) |
| "Frozen Star" | 2017 | Helalyn Flowers | Frozen Star EP |
| "Absence" | 2017 | Ludovico Technique | Absence (single) |
| "Free" | 2019 | Mondträume | Lovers, Sinners & Liars |
| "Hourglass of Life" | 2019 | BlutEngel | Damokles (Limited Edition) |
| "Magic Spell" | 2020 | Prometheus Flame | Magic Spell(s) (single) |
| "I Despise You" | 2021 | Solar Fake | Enjoy Dystopia (Deluxe Edition) |
