= Master & Servant (Massive Ego album) =

Compilation album by Massive Ego
- Released: 13 March 2009
- Genre: Dance
- Label: Dance Street; ZYX

Massive Ego chronology
Nite Klub Skewl (2007)	Master & Servant (2009)	I Idolize You (2011)

Singles from Master & Servant
- 1. "Sex Drive" Released: 30 October 2009; 2. "Sex Drive/Master and Servant" Released: 2010; 3. "I Like Boys (Lia Organa & Electric Prince Remix)" Released: 9 July 2013

Master & Servant is a compilation album by dance band Massive Ego. It consists of eleven of twelve tracks from the album Nite Klub Skewl plus three more new tracks, including the single "Sex Drive". A music video was made for the Lia Organa & Electric Prince remix of "Master and Servant" and was planned for a release as a single, but the single remained unreleased until 2010 as a double A-side with "Sex Drive".

== Background ==
Massive Ego licensed the Nite Klub Skewl album to the German label, Dance Street/ZYX Records, who re-packaged and renamed the album Master & Servant. The only track from Nite Klub Skewl not to be included on this release was "Never Felt As Good".

The band recorded two new songs for the album with Groovesisters; a cover of David Bowie's "Hallo Spaceboy" and "Sex Drive", which was the second single released by Massive Ego, that was a cover of Pete Burns band, Dead or Alive. and was re-released as a double A-side single with a cover of Depeche Mode's "Master and Servant" in 2010.

Lia Organa & Electric Prince remixed "Master and Servant" for the single and video, and later remixed "I Like Boys", which was released via the Massive Ego Bandcamp page on 9 July 2013.

== Track listing ==
No.	Title	Originally by	Length
1.	"Master and Servant"	Depeche Mode	3:09
2.	"Supernature"	Cerrone	4:46
3.	"Sex Drive (Groovesister Edit)"	Dead or Alive	3:45
4.	"You Think You're a Man"	Divine	3:12
5.	"Murder"		8:31
6.	"Obsession"	Animotion	3:41
7.	"My Heart Goes Bang (Get Me to the Doctor)"	Dead or Alive	3:55
8.	"Nite Klub Skewl"		6:08
9.	"Hallo Spaceboy (Groovesisters Mix)"	David Bowie	4:28
10.	"Broken Land"	The Adventures	4:52
11.	"Planet Earth"	Duran Duran	4:36
12.	"Sweet Harmony"	The Beloved	3:26
13.	"I Like Boys (Benni D Mix)"		3:22
14.	"Wrecked"		3:58
15.	"Fight the Feeling"		3:49
16.	"Supernature (Music video)"
17.	"Planet Earth (Music video)"

== Personnel ==
- Vocals: Marc Massive
- Guitar: Steady Eddie Orange Dasher (Track 5)
- Sequencing: Duncan Millar (Track 3)
- Featured vocals: Caron Geary The Infidel (Track 10)
- Featured vocals: Dusty 'O' (Tracks 7 & 8)
- Featured vocals: Maggie K DeMonde (Track 15)
- Featured vocals: Zoe Fuller (Track 6, 12)
- Backing vocals: Jacquii Cann (Track 10)
- Backing vocals: Sally Jaxx (Track 2)
- Backing vocals: Teresa Marie (Track 1)
- Written by: Jewels & Stone (Track 5)
- Written by: Marc Massive (Tracks 8, 13, 14 & 15)
- Written by: Andy J Thirwall (Track 15)
- Written by: Dusty 'O' (Track 8)
- Written by: Barry Stone (Track 5, 14)
- Written by: James Sammon (Pianoman) (Track 13)
- Remix: Ross Alexander (Track 7)
- Remix: Nick Crittenden & Scott Houzet (Groovesisters) (Track 7)
- Remix: Benni Digital (Track 13)
- Producer: Marc Massive (Tracks 8, 14 & 15)
- Producer: Ross Alexander (Track 1, 2, 6, 10 & 12)
- Producer: Sandy Burnett (Track 5)
- Producer: Nick Crittenden & Paul Tams (Track 7)
- Producer: Barry Stone (Track 11 & 13)
