= Nude (Dead or Alive album) =

1988 studio album by Dead or Alive

Studio album by Dead or Alive
- Released: 18 December 1988 (Japan); 31 July 1989 (UK)
- Recorded: 1988
- Studio: Good Earth (London)
- Genres: Dance-pop; hi-NRG
- Length: 44:06
- Label: Epic
- Producer: Dead or Alive

Dead or Alive chronology
Rip It Up (1987)	Nude (1988)	Fan the Flame (Part 1) (1990)

Singles from Nude
- 1. "Turn Around and Count 2 Ten" Released: 22 August 1988; 2. "Come Home With Me Baby" Released: 17 May 1989; 3. "Baby Don't Say Goodbye" Released: 26 October 1989

Nude is the fourth studio album by the English pop band Dead or Alive, released in Japan on 18 December 1988, and in Europe and America in July 1989 on Epic Records. Nude marked the band's first entirely self-produced album. Tim Lever and Mike Percy left the band during the album's production, leaving remaining members Pete Burns and Steve Coy. While the album was not as commercially successful in the band's native United Kingdom as their previous offerings, the album peaked within the top 10 in Japan, charted for 18 weeks, and produced the band's biggest hit single in the territory, "Turn Around and Count 2 Ten", which peaked atop the Oricon Singles Chart. The album was re-released in the UK in 2016 as a part of the comprehensive box set Sophisticated Boom Box MMXVI.

== Promotion ==
Three singles were released to promote the release of Nude, the Japanese number-one Turn Around and Count 2 Ten, and US Dance hits Come Home with Me Baby (#1) and Baby Don't Say Goodbye (#6). I Cannot Carry On was lifted from the album as an airplay single in Japan in 1988, but did not receive a commercial release. In the UK, Baby Don't Say Goodbye was to be released as the third and final single from the album in 1989 (catalogue numbers ‘BURNS T6’ 12” vinyl and ‘BURNS C6’ CD single) however the release was quickly withdrawn. The mixes from this planned release would later feature on the box set Still Spinnin': The Singles Collection 1983-2021 in February 2024. Furthermore, Give It Back (That Love Is Mine) appeared on various Epic sampler releases in both Japan and the US in 1989, but no official single release ever materialised.

In support of the album, the band embarked on the Disco in Dream Tour alongside fellow Stock Aitken Waterman-produced acts Kylie Minogue and Sinitta in Japan, which opened in Nagoya at the Nagoya Rainbow Hall on October 2, 1989, and concluded in Osaka at the Osaka-jō Hall on October 8, 1989. The performance at the Tokyo Dome, recorded on October 6, 1989, was broadcast on NHK, wherein the band performed multiple tracks from Nude.

== Critical reception ==
Reviewing the album for Melody Maker (issue dated August 5, 1989), Steve Sutherland concluded the album's lyrical content was "rife with confrontations, accusations, proclamations, anything that keeps Burns centre-stage, preening himself through roles like a camp Olivier," whilst noting that, "stylistically, Nude [hadn't] moved much anywhere from the exhilarating hi-NRG of Mad, Bad and Dangerous to Know." Retrospectively reviewing the album in 2021, Connor Grotto for RetroPop Magazine described Nude as the "perfect Dead or Alive album" and "their strongest offering overall".

== Track listing ==
No.	Title	Length
1.	"Turn Around and Count 2 Ten"	6:52
2.	"Give It Back That Love Is Mine"	3:28
3.	"Baby Don't Say Goodbye"	5:56
4.	"Stop Kicking My Heart Around"	6:09
5.	"Come Home With Me Baby"	4:07
6.	"I Don't Wanna Be Your Boyfriend"	4:40
7.	"Get Out of My House"	4:19
8.	"I Cannot Carry On"	5:00
9.	"My Forbidden Lover"	3:35

Japanese edition bonus tracks
No.	Title	Length
10.	"Give It Back" (Instrumental)	3:27
11.	"Baby Don't Say Goodbye" (Alternative Mix)	4:19
12.	"Love Toy" (Instrumental)	1:55

== Personnel ==
Dead or Alive

- Pete Burns – vocals
- Steve Coy – drums
- Mike Percy - bass (track 1)
- Tim Lever - keyboards (track 1)

Additional personnel

- Andy Stennet – additional keyboards
- Tracy Ackerman, Laura Pallas, Jackie Raw – backing vocals

=== Production ===
- All tracks produced, arranged and mixed by Pete Burns and Steve Coy
- Tracks 1, 3 and 5 engineered and mixed by Bruce Robins, re-recorded and mixed by Phil Bodger
- House engineers: Paul Cartledge, Simon Clay
- Assistant engineers: Benjamin Hallowell, Garrison III
- Recorded and mixed at Good Earth Studios, London
- Digitally edited by Simon Everett at Mayfair
- Photography: Paul Cox, Peter Brown, Marti and Pierre Chan
- Graphic design: Andie Airfix - Satori

== Chart performance ==
Chart (1989)	Peak position
Australian Albums Chart	62
Canada Top 100 Albums	87
Finnish Album Chart	20
Japanese Oricon Albums Chart	9
US Billboard 200	106
UK Albums Chart	82

== Nude - Remade Remodelled ==
Nude - Remade Remodelled

Remix album by Dead or Alive
- Released: 21 September 1989
- Genres: Dance-pop; hi-NRG
- Length: 43:17
- Label: Epic
- Producer: Dead or Alive

To accompany the album and to promote the concert tour Disco in Dream in Japan, a remix album entitled Nude - Remade Remodelled was released exclusively in the territory on September 21, 1989. Featuring the first six tracks from Nude remixed by Burns and Coy and the 12" Version of Come Home with Me Baby, the album proved a success in Japan, reaching number 17 on the Oricon Albums Chart and charting for six weeks.
