= Nite Klub Skewl =

Studio album by Massive Ego
- Released: 29 January 2007
- Genre: Dance
- Label: Dance Street

Massive Ego chronology
Nite Klub Skewl (2007)	Master & Servant (2009)

Singles from Nite Klub Skewl
- 1. "You Think You're a Man" Released: 1997; 2. "Planet Earth" Released: 1999; 3. "My Heart Goes Bang (Get Me to the Doctor)" Released: 2002

Nite Klub Skewl is the debut album by then-dance band Massive Ego. It features the band's three earlier singles, and is composed mostly of covers. It also has songs written by the band, such as "Murder" which had been released as a radio edit on the "My Heart Goes Bang" single. Two music videos were released to promote the album; "Supernature" and "Planet Earth" (Jewels & Stone Edit).

== Track listing ==
No.	Title	Originally by	Length
1.	"Broken Land"	The Adventures	4:51
2.	"Planet Earth"	Duran Duran	4:38
3.	"Supernature"	Cerrone	4:44
4.	"Murder"		8:30
5.	"Sweet Harmony"	The Beloved	3:26
6.	"My Heart Goes Bang (Get Me to the Doctor)"	Dead or Alive	3:56
7.	"Fight the Feeling"		3:50
8.	"Obsession"	Animotion	3:41
9.	"You Think You're a Man"	Divine	3:13
10.	"Wrecked"		3:57
11.	"Nite Klub Skewl"		6:09
12.	"Never Felt As Good"	Belvedere Kane (Note: A contemporary band to early Massive Ego, also from the Romo movement)	4:01
13.	"Master and Servant"	Depeche Mode	3:07
14.	"Supernature (Music video)"
15.	"Planet Earth (Music video)"

== Personnel ==
- Marc Massive – vocals, lyrics
- Steady – guitar (track 4)
- Caron Geary The Infidel – featured vocals (track 1)
- Dusty 'O' – featured vocals (tracks 6 & 11)
- Maggie K DeMonde – featured vocals (track 7)
- Zoe Fuller – featured vocals (track 5 & 8)
- Jacquii Cann – backing vocals (track 1)
- Sally Jaxx – backing vocals (track 3)
- Laura Harding – backing vocals (track 12)
- Teresa Marie – backing vocals (track 13)
- Ross Alexander – remix (track 6)
- Andy J Thirwall – producer (tracks 7, 9 & 10)
- Marc Massive – producer (tracks 7, 10 & 11)
- Ross Alexander – producer (track 1, 3, 5, 8, 12 & 13)
- Barry Stone – producer (track 2)
- Sandy Burnett – producer (track 4)
- Nick Crittenden & Paul Tams – producer (track 6)
- Peter Maher – mastering
- Bambi Fantastic – photography
