= Low Life (EP) =

EP by Massive Ego & Empire State Human
- Released: 20 October 2014
- Genre: Electronic
- Label: Public Disordar

Massive Ego & Empire State Human chronology
I Idolize You (2011)	Low Life (2014)	Noise in the Machine (2015)

Singles from Low Life
- 1. "Sound of the Download" Released: 4 February 2014; 2. "Animal Rights, Human Wrongs" Released: 24 August 2014; 3. "Reining in the Machines (Matt Pop Remix)" Released: 20 May 2016

Low Life is the first EP from British darkwave band Massive Ego. It was a collaboration with the Irish electronic group Empire State Human. It was released on Marc Massive's own independent label, Public Disordar Records, on 20 October 2014.

Two singles preceded the album, and two singles donated profits from their release to animal charities. Two music videos were released to promote the EP; Sound of the Download and Low Life

== Background ==
In 2014, Massive Ego began collaborating with Irish electronic band, Empire State Human, and on 4 February, Sound of the Download was released as a digital single. A song about illegal downloading. This would be the first release from a collaboration EP by the two bands. Later that year, Animal Rights Human Wrongs was released as a digital single with proceeds going to the charities, Saving Strays in Sarajevo and The Mayhew Animal Home in the UK. It was a modern take on the 'animal rights song' genre.

The Low Life EP was a released on 20 October. The title track was a song about the tragic loss of ex-bandmember, Steady (Eddie Orange Dasher), when he committed suicide in 2005. And features guest vocals by Maggie K DeMonde of Scarlet Fantastic. Low Life was re-recorded with the new band lineup in 2016, for the upcoming album Beautiful Suicide. The album will feature a dedication to his memory inside the album booklet.

Reigning in the Machines, a song that reflects on darker side of technology, was released as a digital single, remixed by Matt Pop, exclusively on the Public Disordar Bandcamp and donates all profits from its sale to the Norton Animal Rescue Foundation.

== Track listing ==
No.	Title	Length
1.	"Low Life"	3:50
2.	"Low Life (People Theatre's Candle Mix)"	4:56
3.	"Low Life (Zarkoff Remix)"	4:45
4.	"Low Life (Logan Sky's Quick Escape Remix)"	3:46
5.	"Reining in the Machines"	3:38
6.	"Animal Rights, Human Wrongs"	3:38
7.	"Plastic Toy From China"	1:28
8.	"Sound of the Download (Original Version)"	4:19

== Personnel ==
- Music by: Empire State Human > Marc Massive
- Lyrics, vocals: Marc Massive
- Music by Marc Massive
- Music by: Empire State Human
- Lyrics: Zaran Naylor & Marc Massive (Track 6)
- Featured vocals: Maggie K DeMonde (Track 1-4)
- Remix by: Peter Rainman (Track 2)
- Remix: Saša Rajković (Track 3)
- Mastered by: Peter Maher
- Sleeve image: Plane Clothing
