= Symphony of Flies =

Studio album by Massive Ego
- Released: 8 May 2026
- Recorded: 2024–2026
- Studio: Ford Lane Studios, Ford and Hove, UK
- Genre: Darkwave; electronic
- Label: Out of Line

Massive Ego chronology
Church For the Malfunctioned (2019)	Symphony of Flies (2026)

Singles from Symphony of Flies
- 1. "In Your Own Darkness" Released: 21 June 2024; 2. "(My) Death Song" Released: 6 February 2025; 3. "Hit the Kerb Running" Released: 24 April 2025; 4. "Man Become Monster" Released: 24 July 2025; 5. "Broken Tomorrow (feat Boy George)" Released: 30 January 2026

Symphony of Flies is the fourth studio album from British darkwave band Massive Ego and the third album released on the label Out of Line Music. It marks the first recording of the band with Lloyd and Porl in the lineup.

== Background ==
The album was recorded between 2024 & 2026, at Ford Lane Studios. The band split up in 2022 due to mental health issues caused by targeted harassment from an ex-band member, of whom the band refuse to name. After coming close to suicide, it took Marc 18 months, sequestered with his husband, Olly, to work through self help books. In 2024 the band reformed and began to write music together. Having worked through their mental health issues, Marc found a new mantra, "The worst things that happen to you are the best things that happen to you," which aided in the cathartic process of writing lyrics for the album.

The album also features a duet with the 80s icon Boy George. After having known George for a few dacades, and having written the single Let Go for the album Beautiful Suicide, Marc sent him the demo for Broken Tomorrow. Having listened to the demo, he rewrote the vocals and lyrics, keeping only the title. "You don't argue with someone who's sold millions of records," Marc said about the new iteration of the song. A music video was later filmed for the release of the track as the band's fifth single from the album.

Five of the tracks have been performed live. Three prior to the album's release and two post-release. The first being the album's first single, In Your Own Darkness, at the Out of Line Weekender 2024. Third and fourth singles, Hit the Kerb Running and Man Become Monster received their live debut at Flugplatz Hildesheim-Drispenstedt, Hildesheim, Germany in 2025. The last two songs to debut, were played the day after the album's release, at the Out of Line Weekender 2026. Those were the fifth and final single from the album, Broken Tomorrow, the duet with Boy George, and Spectacle of My Own Making.

Symphony of Flies marks the first release by the band on vinyl.

== Critical reception ==
Professional ratings
Review scores
Source	Rating
ClassiC Pop Magazine	4/5 stars

Symphony of Flies has received favourable reviews from music critics. In ClassiC Pop Magazine, the album scored above four of five stars and was described as infectious in every sense.

== Track listing ==
All lyrics are written by Marc Massive, except "Broken Tomorrow" by Boy George.
All music written by Massive Ego.

No.	Title	Length
1.	"In Your Own Darkness"	4:16
2.	"Hit the Kerb Running"	3:32
3.	"(My) Death Song"	5:32
4.	"Broken Tomorrow" (featuring Boy George)	3:29
5.	"Life Has Other Plans"	3:22
6.	"Man Become Monster"	3:31
7.	"Dark Matter"	4:03
8.	"Shiver Shadow"	4:51
9.	"Beautiful Mind"	3:46
10.	"Spectacle of My Own Making"	4:09

== Personnel ==
- Marc Massive – vocals & lyrics
- Lloyd Price – keyboards, programming, guitars & production
- Porl Young – guitars, programming, keyboards, production, mixing & mastering
- Oliver Frost – drums
- Richard Olah – additional production (tracks 1, 3, 6 & 7)
- Boy George – featured vocals (track 4)
- Frost + Massive – art direction
- Dean Stockings – band photography
- Ryan Antony Hunt – sleeve design & graphics
- Christine Bateman – make-up for Marc Massive
