= Fragile (Dead or Alive album) =

Studio album by Dead or Alive
- Released: 27 September 2000
- Recorded: 1996–2000
- Genre: Dance; hi-NRG; nu-disco
- Label: Avex Trax (Japan)
- Producer: Dead or Alive

Dead or Alive chronology
Nukleopatra (1995)	Fragile (2000)	Unbreakable (2001)

Singles from Fragile
- 1. "Hit and Run Lover" Released: 2000

Fragile is the seventh album released by British band Dead or Alive in 2000 and the final album of newly-recorded material (their following album, Fan the Flame (Part 2): The Resurrection, would consist of tracks recorded from 1990–1994). The album was originally only released in Japan by independent record company Avex Trax. The album remained an exclusive release in this territory until 2016. With thirteen tracks, the album contains some new material as well as re-recordings of previous songs. Also included is a cover of U2's song "Even Better Than the Real Thing", which had previously appeared on a U2 tribute album. In 2001, Dead or Alive released the remix album Unbreakable, containing further remixes of songs from Fragile.

== Track listing ==
1. "Hit and Run Lover" – 4:42
2. "Turn Around & Count 2 Ten" – 5:17 *
3. "Something in My House" – 4:01 *
4. "Even Better Than the Real Thing 2000" – 3:07
5. "I Paralyze" – 5:55
6. "Isn't It a Pity?" – 4:45
7. "You Spin Me Round (Like a Record)" – 6:05 *
8. "Just What I Always Wanted" – 5:16
9. "My Heart Goes Bang" – 5:05 *
10. "Lover Come Back to Me" – 5:36 *
11. "I Promised Myself" – 4:32
12. "Blue Christmas 2000" – 3:39 *
13. "Hit and Run Lover (Bonus Hit Remix)" – 4:42

( * ) 2000 remix version (not original)

== Chart performance ==
Chart (2000)	Peak position
Oricon Japanese Albums Chart	45

== Personnel ==
- Pete Burns – vocals, production
- Jason Alburey – keyboards, guitars, production
- Dean Bright – keyboards, keytar, production
- Steve Coy – drums, production
