= Beautiful Suicide =

Studio album by Massive Ego
- Released: 17 February 2017
- Genre: Darkwave; electronic
- Length: 1:50:57
- Label: Out of Line

Massive Ego chronology
Noise in the Machine (2015)	Beautiful Suicide (2017)	Church For the Malfunctioned (2019)

Singles from Beautiful Suicide
- 1. "Low Life" Released: 20 April 2017

Beautiful Suicide is the second studio album from British darkwave band Massive Ego. It was released as a double-disc album on the label Out of Line Music. It is the debut album for both the label, and the new lineup of the band.

== Background ==
The album was recorded throughout 2016, with many tracks also performed live throughout the year, including "Let Go", written by Boy George, a friend of Marc Massive. This would later be announced as the lead single for the album, with a video being recorded in January 2017. Other tracks such as "Drag Me In, Drag Me Under" and "Out of Line" were released on the Out of Line compilation series Electrostorm Vol. 6 and on the Electronic Saviours compilation series Electronic Saviors: Industrial Music to Cure Cancer Vol. 4, respectively. Each being an exclusive mix for each of the compilations.

Older tracks such as "Low Life", originally a collaboration with Empire State Human prior to signing to Out of Line Music, was completely re-recorded for the new album. There are four tracks that have featured vocalists: "For the Blood in Your Veins" featuring label mates Blutengel's Chris Pohl; "Haters Gonna Hate", with German gothic rapper Belzebub; Maggie K DeMonde of Scarlet Fantastic on "Low Life"; and Gene Serene (who has collaborated with Lloyd Price's side project The Frixion) takes the place of Holly Pearl on a new version of "Out of Line".

The album's prologue, "Ghost in My Dream", was written by Price, and samples an interview of Nick Rhodes. The orchestral epilogue was written by Scot Collins, based on the track "I Idolize You". A cover of Hazel O'Connor's "Eighth Day" was recorded for the album, but was then removed from the final track listing.

Prior to the album, Massive Ego had remixed songs for Blutengel and Chrom, who are both on Out of Line Music, and British electronic group Nature of Wires. In return, they remixed tracks that were included on the album.

The title of the album, Beautiful Suicide, was announced in a Christmas message from the band through their social media accounts. The title was originally inspired by a photo by Robert C. Wiles called The Most Beautiful Suicide. The photo shows Evelyn McHale, a young woman of 23, who jumped from the observation deck of the Empire State Building in 1947, landing on a car.

Photography for the album cover and booklet was done by '80s photographer David Levine and SuicideGirls model Honey Manko, who featured in the video for "I Idolize You" in December 2016. The booklet contains a dedication to ex-bandmember Steady (Eddie Orange Dasher), of whom the song "Low Life" was written about. The album was mastered by Chris Pohl and Mario Rühlicke at Fear in Motion Productions, Berlin. The release date was announced when the album was made available through Out of Line Music's website.

To celebrate a year since the release of Beautiful Suicide, the band released Nothing But A Void via their Bandcamp page. It featured two previously unreleased tracks from the album's recording sessions: Eighth Day and the Brando remix of Let Go.

== Track listing ==
All lyrics are written by Marc Massive, except; "Let Go" by George O'Dowd, Luke Begley & Sam Lewis, "Haters Gonna Hate" by Marc Massive & Manuel Enghuber, "For the Blood in Your Veins" & "Coldest Light of Day" by Lloyd Price.

No.	Title	Music	Length
1.	"Ghost in My Dream (Prologue)"	Price	1:14
2.	"Low Life" (featuring Maggie K DeMonde)	Price	4:04
3.	"She Uses Sex"	Price, Scot Collins	3:54
4.	"The Girl Who Finds Gifts from Crows"	Price	3:44
5.	"Kate's in a State"	Collins, Price	3:21
6.	"Let Go"	O'Dowd, Begley, Lewis, Collins, Price	4:24
7.	"Haters Gonna Hate" (featuring Belzebub)	Collins, Price	3:31
8.	"For the Blood in Your Veins" (featuring Chris Pohl)	Price, Collins	4:06
9.	"I Idolize You"	Price	4:40
10.	"Out of Line" (featuring Gene Serene)	Price, Collins	4:54
11.	"Coldest Light of Day"	Price, Collins	4:57
12.	"Where I Find Myself"	Price	4:28
13.	"Drag Me in, Drag Me Under"	Collins, Price	5:03
14.	"Beautiful Suicide"	Collins, Price	5:27
15.	"I Idolize You (Orchestral Epilogue)"	Collins	3:49

All lyrics are written by Marc Massive.

No.	Title	Music	Length
1.	"Public Disorder"	Collins	1:36
2.	"Rise"	Collins, Price	4:49
3.	"Dead Silence Rising"	Price	5:33
4.	"Goodbye London"	Price	4:01
5.	"Let Go" (BlutEngel Remix)	BlutEngel	4:33
6.	"Let Go" (Ashbury Heights Remix)	Ashbury Heights	4:03
7.	"She Uses Sex" (Chrom Remix)	Chrom	4:24
8.	"Kate's in a State" (Ludovico Technique Remix)	Ludovico Technique	3:46
9.	"For the Blood in Your Veins" (Nature of Wires Remix)	Nature of Wires	5:53
10.	"For the Blood in Your Veins" (Ash Code Remix)	Ash Code	4:38
11.	"Drag Me in, Drag Me Under" (Neroargento Remix)	Neroargento	5:46

== Personnel ==
- Marc Massive – vocals, lyrics, art direction
- Lloyd Price – keyboards, programming, music
- Scot Collins – keyboards, programming, music
- Oliver Frost – percussion, art direction
- Nick Rhodes – sample (track 1)
- Maggie K. DeMonde – featured vocals (track 2)
- Manuel Enghuber – featured vocals (track 7)
- Chris Pohl – featured vocals (track 8)
- Gene Serene – featured vocals (track 10)
- Chris Pohl – mixing
- Mario Rühlicke – mixing
- David Levine – photography
- Honey Manko – model
- UserDX – sleeve design
