= Nukleopatra =

Studio album by Dead or Alive
- Released: 21 October 1995
- Recorded: 1994–1995
- Label: Epic
- Producer: Steve Coy; Barry Stone

Dead or Alive chronology
| Fan the Flame (Part 1) (1990) | Nukleopatra (1995) | Fragile (2000) |

Singles from Nukleopatra
- 1. "Rebel Rebel" Released: 18 June 1994; 2. "You Spin Me Round (Like a Record) (1996 Remix)" Released: 1996; 3. "Sex Drive" Released: 10 March 1997

Professional ratings
Review scores
| Source | Rating |
|---|---|
| AllMusic | 3/5 stars |
| Pitchfork | 2.1/10 |

Nukleopatra is the sixth studio album from British synth-pop band Dead or Alive, first released in Japan in 1995 by Epic Records. Nukleopatra was subsequently issued by several different labels in different territories, with varying track listings, timings and artwork.

== Production ==
In the early-1990s, Burns and Coy signed with Pete Waterman's PWL Records and work was started on new tracks co-written and produced by Mike Stock. The sessions were aborted when Stock abruptly quit over his dissatisfaction with his share of publishing royalties on the new material.

Work on new material recommenced at PWL with Barry Stone taking over co-production duties and the project now funded by Sony Japan. The first release was a cover version of David Bowie's "Rebel Rebel", released as a single under the name International Chrysis – named after the late transsexual nightclub performer. An initial version of the track, featuring new lyrics written by Burns, was blocked by Bowie – who legally denied permission to use new lyrics, and unsuccessfully requested the track not be covered by the band at all.

Several of the tracks on Nukleopatra were re-written, re-recorded or remixed versions of songs from Fan the Flame (Part 1), which had then only been released in Japan, and the unfinished Fan the Flame (Part 2). Burns had also collaborated with the Italian Eurodance-duo Glam to produce the single "Sex Drive", which was re-recorded for inclusion on Nukleopatra. In 1997, Burns claimed that some of the song covers were included as "album fillers", when studio time to write new material was cut short as "the record label started to fall to bits".

The album was initially released by different labels in various territories between 1995 and 1998. The band claimed that Pete Waterman refused their request to use Paul Oakenfold and other remixers to work on further singles, as he had wanted to write and produce for the band himself.

== Track listing ==
Japanese version – 1995, Epic Records (ESCA 6215)
| No. | Title | Writer(s) | Length |
|---|---|---|---|
| 1. | "Nukleopatra" | Pete Burns, Steve Coy | 7:03 |
| 2. | "Unhappy Birthday" | Burns, Coy, Peter Oxendale | 6:13 |
| 3. | "Rebel Rebel" | David Bowie | 4:17 |
| 4. | "Sleep with You" | Burns, Coy, Oxendale | 5:33 |
| 5. | "The Right Stuff" | Burns, Coy, Zeben Jameson | 4:06 |
| 6. | "I'm a Star" | Burns, Coy, Oxendale | 4:54 |
| 7. | "International Thing" | Burns, Coy, Oxendale | 6:57 |
| 8. | "Picture This" | Deborah Harry, Chris Stein, Jimmy Destri | 4:53 |
| 9. | "Spend the Night Together" | Burns, Coy, Oxendale | 9:06 |
| 10. | "Gone Too Long" | Burns, Coy, Oxendale | 5:02 |
| 11. | "Getting It On" | Burns, Coy | 7:19 |
| 12. | "Sex Drive" | Burns, Ricky Persi, Davide Rizzatti, Elvio Moratto, Riccardo Testoni | 6:40 |

Australian and European versions – 1996, Columbia (484354 2)
| No. | Title | Length |
|---|---|---|
| 1. | "Nukleopatra" | 4:18 |
| 2. | "Sex Drive" | 5:14 |
| 3. | "You Spin Me Round (Like a Record)" ('96 Remix – Sugar Pumpers Radio Remix) | 3:39 |
| 4. | "International Thing" | 3:45 |
| 5. | "Picture This" | 4:53 |
| 6. | "Unhappy Birthday" (12" Remix) | 7:32 |
| 7. | "Rebel Rebel" | 6:37 |
| 8. | "I'm a Star" | 4:54 |
| 9. | "Sleep with You" | 5:33 |
| 10. | "The Right Stuff" | 4:06 |
| 11. | "Gone Too Long" | 5:02 |
| 12. | "Getting It On" | 7:19 |
| 13. | "Spend the Night Together" | 9:06 |

France version – 1997, RKG Records / Plug In / Polygram (537 895-2)
| No. | Title | Length |
|---|---|---|
| 1. | "Sex Drive" | 6:34 |
| 2. | "You Spin Me Round (like a record...) '97 (400HZ – Kleopatra Remix)" | 4:12 |
| 3. | "International Thing" | 6:57 |
| 4. | "Rebel Rebel" | 4:15 |
| 5. | "Getting It On" | 7:17 |
| 6. | "Nukleopatra" | 4:15 |
| 7. | "Spend The Night Together" | 8:20 |
| 8. | "Sleep With You" | 5:31 |
| 9. | "The Right Stuff" | 4:05 |
| 10. | "Gone Too Long" | 5:00 |
| 11. | "Unhappy Birthday" | 6:22 |
| 12. | "Picture This" | 4:54 |
| 13. | "I'm A Star" | 4:47 |
| 14. | "You Spin Me Round (like a record...) '97 (Jail House – Club Remix)" | 4:59 |

US version – 1998, Cleopatra (CLP 0318-2)
| No. | Title | Length |
|---|---|---|
| 1. | "Nukleopatra" | 4:18 |
| 2. | "Sex Drive" | 5:14 |
| 3. | "You Spin Me Round" (Sugar Pumpers Radio Remix) | 3:39 |
| 4. | "International Thing" | 6:57 |
| 5. | "Picture This" | 4:53 |
| 6. | "Unhappy Birthday" (12" Remix) | 7:32 |
| 7. | "Rebel Rebel" | 4:17 |
| 8. | "I'm a Star" | 4:54 |
| 9. | "Sleep with You" | 5:33 |
| 10. | "The Right Stuff" | 4:06 |
| 11. | "Gone Too Long" | 5:02 |
| 12. | "Getting It On" | 5:49 |
| 13. | "Spend the Night Together" | 4:06 |
| 14. | "You Spin Me Round" (Jail House Mix) | 4:35 |
| 15. | "Sex Drive" (Scream Driven Mix) | 6:59 |

== Personnel ==
- Pete Burns – vocals
- Jason Alburey – keyboards
- Dean Bright – keyboards, keytar
- Steve Coy – drums, bass guitar, guitars

== Charts ==
Chart performance for Nukleopatra
| Chart (1995) | Peak position |
|---|---|
| Australian Albums (ARIA) | 43 |
| Chart (1997) | Peak position |
| Hungarian Albums (Mahasz) | 37 |
