= Something in My House =

Single by Dead or Alive

from the album Mad, Bad and Dangerous to Know
- B-side: "D.J. Hit That Button"
- Released: 29 December 1986
- Recorded: 1986
- Genre: Hi-NRG; synth-pop
- Length: 3:48 (7" single); 7:21 (album version)
- Label: Epic
- Songwriters: Pete Burns; Tim Lever; Mike Percy; Steve Coy
- Producer: Stock Aitken Waterman

Dead or Alive singles chronology
"Brand New Lover" (1986)	"Something in My House" (1986)	"Hooked on Love" (1987)

Music video
- "Something in My House” on YouTube

"Something in My House" is a song by the English pop band Dead or Alive, produced by Stock Aitken Waterman. It was released in the UK in December 1986 as the second single from the band's third studio album, Mad, Bad and Dangerous to Know. The single peaked at No. 12 on the UK singles chart.

== Production ==
Originally conceived by singer Pete Burns as a Halloween release, the Gothic-themed "Something in My House" was delayed until late December in the UK amid wrangling between the band and their record company, with the latter feeling the track was "too brutal" to be a single.

Recording of the song was also fraught, with Burns alleging that producer Mike Stock erased his original vocal take after objecting to the singer's use of the phrase "wicked queen"; a lyrical double entendre implying reference to a gay relationship. "We would butt heads so fucking badly; it was unbelievable," Burns told journalist James Arena in his book Europe's Stars of 80s Dance Pop. "That's why we eventually walked away from them. For instance, there was a lyric from 'Something in My House' where I make reference to a wicked queen. "The actual producer, Mike Stock stopped me and said I couldn't use that term because it would mean the record is about gay people. I was like, 'Fuck this, it's going on!' They actually wiped the original vocal, but then Pete Waterman came back and said, 'Let him do it the way he wants to.'"

Despite the reservations of the label and producers, the track proved to be Dead or Alive's biggest hit in the UK since "Lover Come Back to Me" and was the only single from their third album to earn a UK Top 20 placement. Jerry Smith of the Music Week magazine described "Something in My House" a "furiously juddering and sluttering high energy dance tune with a very catchy feel", and praised Phil Harding's "vibrant mix". The song also proved to be the act's final Top 40 hit with an original release in the UK, and their last Top 20 hit in Australia.

=== Multiple versions ===
The song was released in numerous differing forms. The album track, the first version to be released, is actually a remix extended to over 7 minutes, which features flamenco instead of electric guitar and additional tuned percussion. The 7" single release comprises the song in its unedited format, and features electric guitar and a Gothic-inspired intro; it was titled as a "Remix" due to ultimately being released after the album.

Two 12” singles were released in the UK with multiple remixes included. The "Mortevicar Mix" and "Flamenco Mix" both use the flamenco guitar from the album version and the former includes audio samples from the horror movie The Exorcist (1973). The “US Wipe-Out Mix Part 2” is an extended remix, including the electric guitar from the 7" single and the tuned percussion from the album version, and was released with a further remix titled the "House Instrumental".

An additional 12" white label promo mix, known as "Naughty XXX Mix", was released exclusively to club DJs and featured more explicit audio samples from The Exorcist than the "Mortevicar Mix". The track has been described as "unique" in its capacity as the only example of a "filthy, obscene [and] sexually explicit" Stock Aitken Waterman record.

== Music video ==
Clashes between the band and the label continued over the song's music video, with Epic Records reportedly objecting to a "mildly suggestive" sequence involving Burns and a banana.

"By the time we got to 'Something in My House', I felt I wanted to express myself on film, as well as record, amuse myself, show my sense of humour," Burns wrote on the liner notes to his Evolution: The Videos compilation DVD. "Well apparently the manner in which I 'peeled a banana' seemed to work against me/us! And, it was downhill all the way after that."

There are two edits of the music video, one version showing Burns peeling a banana and the other omits it.

== Track listing ==
UK 7", 1986
No.	Title	Length
1.	"Something in My House (Remix)"	3:48
2.	"D.J. Hit That Button"	3:23

UK 12" single, 1986
No.	Title	Length
1.	"Something In My House (Mortevicar Mix)"	6:57
2.	"Something In My House (Flamenco Version)"	4:20
3.	"D.J. Hit That Button"	3:23

UK 12" single, 1986
No.	Title	Length
1.	"Something in My House (U.S. Wipe-Out Mix Part 2)"	7:18
2.	"Something In My House (House Instrumental)"	5:16
3.	"D.J. Hit That Button"	3:21

US & Canda 12" single, 1986
No.	Title	Length
1.	"Something In My House (US Wipe Out Mix - Part 2)"	7:18
2.	"Something In My House (Instrumental)"	5:19
3.	"Something In My House (Mortevicar Mix)"	6:55
4.	"Something In My House (Flamenco Mix)"	4:21

== Charts ==
Chart (1987)	Peak position
Australia (Kent Music Report)	19
Finland (Suomen virallinen lista)	12
Ireland (IRMA)	8
Netherlands (Single Top 100)	79
Luxembourg (Radio Luxembourg)	9
New Zealand (Recorded Music NZ)	31
United Kingdom (CIN)	12
US Billboard Hot 100	85
US Dance Club Songs (Billboard)	3
