= Ashbury Heights =

Swedish electronic music duo

- Origin: Sundsvall, Medelpad, Sweden
- Genres: Synthpop; futurepop; electropop
- Years active: 2005–2010; 2011–present
- Label: Out of Line
- Members: Anders Hagström; Yasmine Uhlin; Johan Andersson
- Past members: Kari Berg; Tea F. Thimé

Ashbury Heights is a Swedish electronic music duo from Sundsvall, Medelpad, formed in 2005. The duo consisted originally of Anders Hagström (vocals, songwriter, music, and programming) and Yasmine Uhlin (vocals). Uhlin left the band after the release of their EP, Morning Star in a Black Car, and was replaced by Kari Berg (vocals) as the lead vocalist. Berg was a member of Ashbury Heights until 2010 and was featured on one album, Take Cair Paramour. In 2010, following a long-running dispute between Hagström and the Out of Line label, the band disbanded. The dispute was settled in 2011, whereupon Hagström and Out of Line renewed their collaboration. In 2013, Tea F. Thimé (vocals and lyrics) joined the band as the new vocalist, coming from a background of alternative modelling and burlesque performance (going by the stage name Tea Time). After Thimé's departure, original member Yasmine Uhlin rejoined the band.

== History ==
=== 2005: Formation ===
Ashbury Heights was created when Anders Hagström asked Yasmine Uhlin if she wanted to sing on his demos. The newly formed band was signed by record label Out of Line soon after, and from then they attained wider recognition.

=== 2008: Yasmine Uhlin's departure ===
Uhlin announced her departure from the band in November 2008 in Hamburg at the last concert of the Out of Line festival tour. On her blog, she wrote: "Why I am doing this is not because of lack of energy or love for the band. There are no grudges to be held and the air within Ashbury Heights is free from any pollution. You see, this is something I have to do. I need to let go in order to build something of my own. I've been fighting myself in this matter for a long time but I can't change what I truly feel."

=== 2008–2010: Kari Berg ===
Anders sought a new singer and found Kari Berg. Previous to joining Ashbury Heights, she had focused mostly on singing opera. Kari was a member of Ashbury Heights from 2008 until 2010, featuring on one album and a remix for BlutEngel. The band's second studio album, Take Cair Paramour was released on 2 July 2010, and is their only album to feature Berg. A limited edition of the album was also released, including a bonus CD with remixes, demos, and exclusive tracks.

=== 2011–2013: Disbandment and renewal ===
In October 2010, Hagström announced that he was disbanding Ashbury Heights due to ongoing disputes with his record label, Out of Line. This dispute was settled in 2011, resulting in the renewed collaboration between Hagström and Out of Line. However, Ashbury Heights did not start recording a new album until 2013, this time with a new singer, Tea F. Thimé.

=== 2013–2019: Tea F. Thimé in Ashbury Heights ===
The first interview with the new Ashbury Heights was published in ElectroStorm 01/2014. There the band stated that Thimé had no previous experience as a singer when joining the band, but was the first full collaborative partner. She has a degree in English literature and is the first band member to co-write lyrics. Thimé used to be an alternative model and styled shoots as well as burlesque performances. The first album with Tea is called The Looking Glass Society and was released in 2015. Before the album was released, Ashbury Heights made their live comeback at the 3rd Out of Line Weekender in Berlin.

Thimé announced her departure from Ashbury Heights to work on her Ph.D on the band's Facebook page on 5 February 2019.

=== 2020–present: Yasmine Uhlin's return and Ghost House Sessions vol. 1 ===
In September 2020 Ashbury Heights released Spectres from the Black Moss, a single featuring original member Yasmine Uhlin. In the following years, the band consistently released new music, often collaborating with other artists. July 2024 saw the release of Ghost House Sessions vol. 1, their first LP since 2018. It features 25 tracks, including 10 previously digital-only singles.

== Live supporting musicians ==
- Elliott Berlin – Keyboards/Guitars (2014–present)
- Johan Andersson – Keyboards/Guitars (2008–present)
- Kendra Katz – Keyboards (2014–present)
- Tomas Gunnarson – Keyboards (2009 on Synapsi in Finland)

== Discography ==
=== Singles ===
- Firebird (2018)
- Spectres from the Black Moss (2020)
- Wild Eyes feat. Madil Hardis (2020)
- One Trick Pony feat. Massive Ego (2021)
- Cutscenes feat. Danny Blu (2021)
- A Cut In A Place feat. Madil Hardis (2022)
- Is That Your Uniform (2022)
- Tunguska feat. Corlyx (2023)
- Ghosts Electric (2023)
- A Lifetime in the Service of Darkness feat. Ulrike Goldmann (2024)

=== Studio albums ===
- Three Cheers for the Newlydeads (2007)
- Take Cair Paramour (2010)
- Take Cair Paramour Alternatives (2012)
- The Looking Glass Society (2015)
- The Victorian Wallflowers (2018)
- Ghost House Sessions, Vol. 1 (2024)

=== Compilation albums ===
- Origins (2010)

=== Extended plays ===
- Parliament of Rooks (2006)
- Morning Star in a Black Car (2008)

=== Demos ===
- Angora Overdrive (2005)
