= Church for the Malfunctioned =

Church For the Malfunctioned

Studio album by Massive Ego
- Released: 26 April 2019
- Recorded: August 2018
- Studio: Studio Under the Stairs
- Genre: Darkwave; electronic
- Label: Out of Line
- Producer: Kyle J. Wilson

Massive Ego chronology
| Beautiful Suicide (2017) | Church For the Malfunctioned (2019) | Symphony of Flies (2026) |

Singles from Church For the Malfunctioned
- 1. "Digital Heroin" Released: 12 April 2019

Church For the Malfunctioned is the third studio album from British darkwave band Massive Ego. It is the second album released on the label Out of Line Music. It marks the first recording of the band as a trio with a heavier and darker style than their previous album.

== Background ==
The album was recorded and produced in August 2018, at The Studio Under the Stairs in Blackpool, by Kyle J. Wilson of Auger. The album also features two duets, one with Auger, and one with Chris L. of Agonoize/Funker Vogt as well as a cover of And One's 2006 classic Military Fashion Show.

Four of the tracks have been performed live prior to the album's release. The first being Digital Heroin and Malfunctioning Me, and later My Religion is Dark and Kill the Conspiracy. Malfunctioning Me was originally a collaboration with multimedia artist, Christo, with Marc contributing lyrics and vocals, and Scot adding synths and guitars. It has changed from slow and atmospheric to a heavier style club track, in keeping with the darker and heavier style of the album. On April 12, the album was preceded by the digital single, Digital Heroin, as well as an accompanying video.

The Last Sunrays in June and Mother Requiem were both written about Marc's Mother, June Lilian Wedgewood, who died in 2017. Her final dying breaths were recorded by Marc at the ZetlandWard, Redcar Primary Care Hospital on 1 October 2017 and used in both of the tracks. The former of the two tells the story of her last days and recounting memories of her life.

Remixes for the album include Mr. Strange, who supported Massive Ego at their A Black XMASsive performance in London 2018. Solar Fake and BlutEngel, the latter of whom they have supported, the latter on their 2019 Un:Gott Tour.

Photography for the album cover and booklet was done by Goddard Llewellyn Goddard of GOD Photography at St Bartholomew's Church, in the band's home town of Brighton.

== Track listing ==
All lyrics are written by Marc Massive, except "The Wolf" by Scot Collins, and "Military Fashion Show" by Steve Naghavi.
All music written by Scot Collins, except "Malfunctioning Me" by Christabel Christo & Marc Massive, and "Military Fashion Show" by Steve Naghavi.

| No. | Title | Length |
|---|---|---|
| 1. | "The Last Sunrays in June" | 6:55 |
| 2. | "Digital Heroin" | 4:14 |
| 3. | "Malfunctioning Me" | 5:07 |
| 4. | "My Religion is Dark" | 4:55 |
| 5. | "Fallen From Grace" | 4:22 |
| 6. | "The Wolf" | 4:28 |
| 7. | "Point of No Return" (featuring Auger) | 5:21 |
| 8. | "Super Selfie Superstar" | 5:29 |
| 9. | "Killing For Gods" | 5:37 |
| 10. | "World in the Gutter" | 4:28 |
| 11. | "Kill the Conspiracy" (featuring Chris L. of Agonoize) | 4:18 |
| 12. | "Military Fashion Show (And One cover)" | 4:33 |
| 13. | "Is the Universe Trying to Tell Me Something?" | 3:37 |
| 14. | "Mother Requiem" | 2:02 |

All lyrics are written by Marc Massive.

| No. | Title | Length |
|---|---|---|
| 1. | "Digital Heroin" (Mr. Strange Remix) | 4:47 |
| 2. | "My Religion is Dark" (BlutEngel Remix) | 5:25 |
| 3. | "Kill the Conspiracy" (Agonoize Remix, featuring Chris L.) | 5:01 |
| 4. | "Digital Heroin" (Solar Fake Remix) | 3:24 |
| 5. | "World in the Gutter" (Auger Remix) | 4:21 |
| 6. | "Kill the Conspiracy" (Kunstwerk Remix, featuring Chris L.) | 4:04 |
| 7. | "Digital Heroin" (OST+Front Liebesgrüße Aus Berlin Remix) | 2:53 |
| 8. | "Killing For Gods" (Forcenry Remix) | 5:33 |
| 9. | "Digital Heroin" (DKAG Remix) | 6:13 |
| 10. | "Malfunctioning Me" (The Horrorist Remix) | 4:11 |

== Critical reception ==
Professional ratings
Review scores
| Source | Rating |
|---|---|
| Electrozombies | 3.8/5 stars |

Church For the Malfunctioned has received generally favourable reviews from music critics. At Electrozombies, the 10/14 tracks were scored above four of five stars. The album was described as a musical gem.

== Personnel ==
- Marc Massive – vocals, lyrics, art direction
- Scot Collins – keyboards, programming, music
- Oliver Frost – percussion, art direction
- Kyle J Wilson – recording, production, mixing, featured vocals (track 7), backing vocals (tracks 1, 2, 4 & 5)
- Chris L. – featured vocals (track 11)
- Feral is Kinky - guest vocal (Track 5)
- June Lilian Wedgewood - final breaths recorded (Tracks 1 & 14)
- Pete Maher – mastering
- GOD Photography – photography
- Ryan Antony Hunt – sleeve design, graphics
- Zara Lipstixx - make-up
