= Swans Way (band) =

British pop band

- Origin: Birmingham, England
- Genre: Pop
- Years active: 1981–1985
- Labels: Exit International, Balgier, Universal, Cherry Pop
- Past members: Maggie De Monde; Rick P. Jones; Robert Shaw

Swans Way were a three-piece English pop group formed in Birmingham in late 1981. The band comprised Robert Shaw (vocals), Maggie De Monde (vocals and percussion) and Rick P. Jones (double bass). They released one album and had a UK Top 20 hit with "Soul Train", before splitting up in 1985.

== History ==
Shaw had previously been the singer/guitarist in The Last Gang, while De Monde and Jones, who met at the University of Kent, had been members of the Playthings. All three were living on the same road in Birmingham when they formed the band, and initially rehearsed in an old casino, experimenting with different instruments. The band's name was a play on Swann's Way, the first volume of Marcel Proust's À la recherche du temps perdu.

Swans Way presented a mixture of musical influences, from jazz to classical and pop to disco. After an appearance on the cassette magazine SFX in May 1982, their first single, "Theme from the Balcony" was issued later that year on Exit Records a label owned by their manager Simon M Woods. Their second single released on Polygram, "Soul Train", gave them their first hit, reaching number 20 in the UK Singles Chart in February 1984. The band subsequently appeared on BBC One's Top of the Pops performing the song on 9 February 1984. They also released further singles, with varying success. "The Anchor", in March 1984, did not chart, whilst "Illuminations" made number 57 in May 1984, and their third and final hit, "When The Wild Calls", peaked outside the Top 75 at number 80. The group recorded an album, The Fugitive Kind, which reached number 88 on the UK Albums Chart in November 1984. The album was issued on CD, but only about 100 copies were pressed. It was re-released on CD in 1997 with extra tracks as The Best of Swans Way and again in 2012 with a different set of bonus tracks under the title of The Fugitive Kind - Expanded Edition.

They performed live on two major television music programmes in 1984 - The Tube in February and Whistle Test in March. In June 1985, a seven song performance filmed at Pebble Mill Studios was broadcast on BBC One as This Is Swans Way. Performances from a concert recorded at The Astoria, London, together with interviews, were broadcast on Channel 4 in May 1985 as part of the Mirror Image series, and the full concert also released by Polygram Video as History and Image.

In July 1985, the band signed a five-year, five-album deal with EMI Records and had recorded demos of new songs, with a new single, "Hot Summer" planned for an August release, but the band split up before any new material was released due to musical differences.

De Monde and Jones went on to work together as Scarlet Fantastic, while Shaw released two albums in the early 2000s under the name Mighty Math and another in 2022 as Sparkleray. De Monde later became half of the recording duos Kahal & Kahal and Maggie & Martin.

== Discography ==
=== Albums ===
- The Fugitive Kind (1984), Balgier - UK No. 88
- The Best Of Swans Way (1998), Universal
- The Fugitive Kind - Expanded Edition (2012), Cherry Pop

=== Singles ===
- "Theme from the Balcony" (1982), Exit International
- "Soul Train" (1984), Exit International - UK No. 20
- "The Anchor" (1984), Exit International
- "Illuminations" (1984), Balgier - UK No. 57
- "When the Wild Calls" (1984), Balgier - UK No. 80

=== Videos ===
- Swans Way History and Image (VHS, 50 mins) (1985), Polygram Video
