= No Memory (Scarlet Fantastic song) =

1987 single by Scarlet Fantastic

Single by Scarlet Fantastic

from the album 24 Hours
- B-side: "No Memory (No Technology)"
- Released: September 1987
- Genre: Synth-pop
- Label: Arista
- Songwriter(s): Maggie De Monde; Rick P. Jones
- Producer(s): Rick P. Jones; Daize Washbourn

Scarlet Fantastic singles chronology
"Plug Me In" (1987)	"No Memory" (1987)	"Film Star Kiss" (1988)

Audio
- "No Memory" on YouTube

"No Memory" is a song by the English synth-pop duo Scarlet Fantastic, released in September 1987 by Arista Records. The song appears on their 1988 debut album 24 Hours. The song was co-written by Maggie De Monde and Rick P. Jones, and produced by Jones and Daize Washbourn. It reached No. 24 on the UK Singles Chart. The song also reached No. 35 in New Zealand.

== Credits and personnel ==
- Maggie De Monde – songwriter, vocals
- Rick P. Jones – songwriter, producer
- Daize Washbourn – producer
- Karen Hewitt – engineering
- Pete Hammond – mixing
- Pete Waterman – mixing
- Peter Ashworth – cover art, photographer
- Laurence Stevens – cover art designer

Credits and personnel adapted from the 24 Hours album liner notes.

== Charts ==
=== Weekly charts ===
Weekly chart performance for "No Memory"
Chart (1987–1988)	Peak position
New Zealand (Recorded Music NZ)	35
UK Singles (OCC)	24
