= Barry Stone =

- Also known as: Belvedere Kane
- Occupations: Songwriter; music producer; remixer
- Years active: 1990s–present

Barry Stone is an Irish songwriter, music producer, and remixer. He is a founding member of the production and songwriting duo The Alias (formerly known as Jewels & Stone), alongside long-term collaborator Julian Gingell. Stone is noted for his extensive work within the British pop genre and for co-composing the theme music for the Idol television franchise.

== Career ==
=== Early career and Belvedere Kane ===
Stone began his career in the music industry during the early 1990s as a recording artist. Performing under the pseudonym Belvedere Kane and associated with the Romo movement, he released the single "Never Felt As Good" in 1996. Although the accompanying album Such Trying Times was recorded, it was ultimately shelved as Stone transitioned into production and engineering. In 1995, he co-produced Dead or Alive's sixth studio album, Nukleopatra, working alongside band members Pete Burns and Steve Coy.

After a 30-year hiatus, the album Such Trying Times was released on 13 February 2026. The record included the song "Legends (Forever Young)," which features a vocal by Burns; the track was released with the blessing of the Dead or Alive estate.

=== The Alias and Jewels & Stone ===
Stone's professional output is primarily characterized by his partnership with Julian Gingell. Initially operating as Jewels & Stone, the duo became established figures in the United Kingdom's pop production sector. They subsequently rebranded as The Alias, focusing on contemporary production and commercial remixing. Stone has maintained a recurring creative involvement with the British group Steps, acting as a producer and songwriter for their contemporary studio albums, including Tears on the Dancefloor (2017) and What the Future Holds (2020). His production credits further include works for The Saturdays, Dannii Minogue, and Sophie Ellis-Bextor. As a remixer, Stone has provided official revisions for international artists such as Britney Spears, Katy Perry, and Selena Gomez.

=== Television composition ===
In 2001, Stone, Gingell, and songwriter Cathy Dennis were commissioned to compose the theme music for the reality television competition Pop Idol. This composition was subsequently adapted for the United States version, American Idol, and was later implemented across numerous international iterations of the franchise. The theme is regarded as one of the most widely broadcast musical compositions in the history of the medium.

== Production and songwriting credits ==
| Year | Artist | Work | Role |
|---|---|---|---|
| 1995 | Dead or Alive | Nukleopatra | Co-producer |
| 2001 | Various | "Pop Idol Theme" | Co-writer |
| 2003 | Dannii Minogue | Neon Nights | Producer / Writer |
| 2017 | Steps | Tears on the Dancefloor | Producer / Writer |
| 2020 | Sophie Ellis-Bextor | Crying at the Discotheque | Producer |

== Solo discography ==
| Title | Format | Year | Label |
|---|---|---|---|
| Never Felt As Good | Single | 1996 | |
| "Such Trying Times " | Album | 2026 | |

== See also ==
- Cathy Dennis
- Pop Idol
