= Fan the Flame (Part 1) =

Studio album by Dead or Alive
- Released: 13 December 1990
- Recorded: 1990
- Genre: Dance-pop; hi-NRG
- Length: 51:38
- Label: Epic
- Producer: Dead or Alive; Tim Weidner

Dead or Alive chronology
Nude – Remade Remodelled (1989)	Fan the Flame (Part 1) (1990)	Nukleopatra (1995)

Singles from Fan the Flame (Part 1)
- 1. "Your Sweetness (Is Your Weakness)" Released: 12 December 1990; 2. "Gone 2 Long" Released: April 1991; 3. "Unhappy Birthday" Released: 21 September 1991

Fan the Flame (Part 1) is the fifth studio album by the English pop band Dead or Alive, released in 1990. Epic Records released Fan the Flame (Part 1) in Japan only, after its international release was cancelled for an unknown reason. The album remained an exclusive release in Japan until 2016.

The album marked a change in the band's musical style with more melancholic lyrics and a different vocal style from Burns. The background vocals on "Total Stranger" were performed by British pop group Londonbeat and the London Community Gospel Choir provided backing vocals for "Unhappy Birthday".

A follow-up album, Fan the Flame (Part 2), also began recording in 1990 but, following the cancelled worldwide release of Part 1, was abandoned until posthumous completion in 2021. Several of the songs from both Part 1 and Part 2 were re-recorded and remixed for the band's following album Nukleopatra.

The track "My Love's on the Line" was also recorded for the album and performed live in 1990, but went unreleased. In 2020, the master tape was discovered in Steve Coy's personal collection and the track was released on the Invincible reissue set the following year.

An acoustic album Love, Pete was also made available during a US personal appearance tour in 1992 and was since widely bootlegged with the title Fan the Flame (Part 2): The Acoustic Sessions. Pete strongly criticized its subsequent distribution. The album peaked at No. 23 on the Japanese Albums Chart.

== Track listing ==
No.	Title	Length
1.	"Your Sweetness (Is Your Weakness)"	5:50
2.	"Unhappy Birthday"	6:47
3.	"Gone 2 Long"	5:45
4.	"Total Stranger"	7:04
5.	"Lucky Day"	7:55
6.	"What Have U Done (2 Make Me Change)"	6:15
7.	"And Then I Met U"	8:04
8.	"Blue Christmas"	3:56

Sophisticated Boom Box bonus track
No.	Title	Length
1.	"Fan The Flame" (previously unreleased)	3:50

Invincible bonus track
No.	Title	Length
9.	"My Love's on the Line" (previously unreleased)	6:28

== Personnel ==
- Pete Burns – vocals
- Peter Oxendale – keyboards
- Steve Coy – drums, keyboards, bass guitar, guitars

Additional personnel

- Billy Currie – electric viola
- Tracy Ackerman – backing vocals
- Londonbeat – male backing vocals
- London Community Gospel Choir – additional backing vocals

Technical

- Tim Weidner – co-producer
- Mickey Mulligan – engineer

== Chart performance ==
Chart (1990)	Peak position
Oricon Japanese Albums Chart	23
