= Brand New Lover =

Single by Dead or Alive

from the album Mad, Bad and Dangerous to Know
- B-side: "In Too Deep" (live)
- Released: 12 September 1986
- Genre: Synth-pop
- Length: 3:35
- Label: Epic
- Songwriters: Pete Burns; Tim Lever; Mike Percy; Steve Coy
- Producer: Stock Aitken Waterman

Dead or Alive singles chronology
"My Heart Goes Bang (Get Me to the Doctor)" (1985)	"Brand New Lover" (1986)	"Something in My House" (1986)

Music video
- "Brand New Lover” on YouTube

"Brand New Lover" is a song recorded by the English pop band Dead or Alive. It is the lead single released from the band's third studio album, Mad, Bad and Dangerous to Know on Epic Records. It achieved international success when released as a single in 1986, including the United States and Japan, though it failed to enter the Top 20 in the UK.

== Background ==
Following a fraught six-month recording session with producers Stock Aitken Waterman (SAW), which was marked by fights and disagreements between the band, record company and producers over the sound of their new material, lead vocalist Pete Burns claimed he struggled to get Epic Records to commit to a release schedule for the single. He said this changed when Bananarama had major success with their Dead or Alive-inspired cover of "Venus", which Burns claimed encouraged the label to schedule "Brand New Lover" for release. Later, Burns blamed the song's disappointing chart run in his home country on his then-ongoing war with his UK label, alleging that the company had failed to press and distribute enough copies of the single to make it a hit, and claiming the band had lost out on 67,000 UK sales as a result.

The album version of the song is a shortened edit of the "Dust Monkey's Love Bubble Club" 12" extended remix version.

== Critical reception ==
Jerry Smith of the Music Week magazine described "Brand New Lover" as a "high energy dance track" with a "typically effervescent style", and praised Burns' "instantly memorable vocal" and SAW's "polished production". By contrast, Ro Newton of Smash Hits considered "it's just the same old... Hi-NRG stomp" and "that's a lost thing" here, as there are "no surprises, no shocks and hardly worth the wait". Retrospectively, in 2020, Daniel Griffiths of musicradar.com considered it a "criminally overlooked nine-minute-plus, rock guitar remix tour-de-force". In 2021, British magazine Classic Pop ranked "Brand New Lover" number 31 in their list of "Top 40 Stock/Aitken/Waterman songs", adding that it "shared rhythmic similarities to their No.1 smash "You Spin Me Round" but leaned heavily on the synth-bass, with Pete Burns' goth-pop tones vocalising his need to flee his lover".

== Chart performance ==
"Brand New Lover" proved to be more successful in the US and in Japan than in the band's native UK, where it reached No. 31. In the US, "Brand New Lover" peaked at No. 15 on the Billboard Hot 100 chart (the band's second and last single to reach the Top 20), and spent two weeks at No. 1 on the American dance chart in December 1986.

"Brand New Lover" was also included on the 1996 compilation album VH-1: The Big 80's.

== Track listing ==
UK 7", 1986
No.	Title	Length
1.	"Brand New Lover"	3:35
2.	"In Too Deep (Live at the Hammersmith Odeon, July 1985)"	4:34

UK 12" single, 1986
No.	Title	Length
1.	"Brand New Lover (The Dust Monkey's Love Bubble Club Mix)"	9:00
2.	"Brand New Lover (Instrumental)"	4:15
3.	"In Too Deep (Live at the Hammersmith Odeon, July 1985)"	4:34

UK 12" single (Up Ducky Mix), 1986
No.	Title	Length
1.	"Brand New Lover (Up Ducky Mix)"	6:25
2.	"Cake And Eat It (Live at the Hammersmith Odeon, July 1985)"	5:33
3.	"In Too Deep (Live at the Hammersmith Odeon, July 1985)"	4:34

US 12" single, 1986
No.	Title	Length
1.	"Brand New Lover (The Dust Monkey's Love Bubble Club Mix)"	9:00
2.	"Brand New Lover (Instrumental)"	4:15
3.	"Brand New Lover (Up Ducky Mix)"	6:35
4.	"In Too Deep (Live at the Hammersmith Odeon, July 1985)"	4:34

== Charts ==
Weekly chart performance for "Brand New Lover"
Chart (1986–1987)	Peak position
Australia (Kent Music Report)	21
Canada (RPM Top Singles)	27
Europe (European Hot 100)	84
Europe (European Airplay Top 50)	32
Finland (Suomen virallinen lista)	6
Ireland (IRMA)	22
Japan (Oricon Singles Chart)	2
Luxembourg (Radio Luxembourg)	23
New Zealand (Recorded Music NZ)	15
South Africa (Springbok Radio)	19
Spain (AFYVE)	39
UK (OCC)	31
US Billboard Hot 100	15
US Billboard Hot Dance Club Play	1
US Billboard 12-inch Singles Sales	1
