= Turn Around and Count 2 Ten =

Single by Dead or Alive

from the album Nude
- B-side: "Something In My House (Instru-Mental Mix)"
- Released: 22 August 1988
- Recorded: 1988
- Genre: Hi-NRG; Eurobeat
- Length: 6:54
- Label: Epic
- Songwriters: Pete Burns; Mike Percy; Tim Lever; Steve Coy

Dead or Alive singles chronology
"I'll Save You All My Kisses" (1987)	"Turn Around and Count 2 Ten" (1988)	"Come Home With Me Baby" (1989)

Music video
- "Turn Around and Count 2 Ten" on YouTube

"Turn Around and Count 2 Ten" is the lead single by the English pop band Dead or Alive from their fourth studio album Nude (1988). Despite that its UK singles chart success was limited to the Top 100 (No. 70 peak), the song reached No. 2 in the US Hot Dance Club Songs chart as well as being No. 1 for 17 weeks in Japan. Two edits were made of the video (the single version and "The Pearl and Dean "I Had A Disco Dream" Mix).

== Track listing ==
=== UK CD single – 1988, Epic (BURNS C4) ===
1. "Turn Around and Count 2 Ten" (7" Version) – 4:52
2. "Something in My House" (Instru-Mental Mix) – 3:34
3. "Turn Around and Count 2 Ten" (The Pearl and Dean "I Love" BPM Mix) – 8:38
4. "Turn Around and Count 2 Ten" (Instru-Mental Mix) – 3:00

== Chart performance ==
Chart (1988)	Peak position
Australian Singles Chart	30
Japanese Singles Chart	1
UK Singles Chart	70
US Billboard Hot Dance Club Songs	2
