= Youthquake (album) =

Studio album by Dead or Alive
- Released: 13 May 1985
- Recorded: 1984–1985
- Genres: Pop; synth-pop; disco
- Length: 36:50
- Label: Epic
- Producer: Stock Aitken Waterman

Dead or Alive chronology
Sophisticated Boom Boom (1984)	Youthquake (1985)	Mad, Bad and Dangerous to Know (1986)

Singles from Youthquake
- 1. "You Spin Me Round (Like a Record)" Released: 9 November 1984; 2. "Lover Come Back to Me" Released: 12 April 1985; 3. "In Too Deep" Released: 21 June 1985; 4. "My Heart Goes Bang (Get Me to the Doctor)" Released: September 1985

Professional ratings
Review scores
Source	Rating
AllMusic	3/5 stars
Rolling Stone	(unfavourable)
Smash Hits	8/10 stars

Youthquake is the second studio album by the English pop band Dead or Alive, released on 13 May 1985 by Epic Records. The album was their commercial breakthrough in Europe and the United States, due to its lead single "You Spin Me Round (Like a Record)", which was a No. 1 hit on the UK singles chart and a Top 20 hit on the US Billboard Hot 100. Additional single releases from the album included "Lover Come Back to Me", "In Too Deep" and "My Heart Goes Bang (Get Me to the Doctor)".

This was Dead or Alive's first collaboration with the Stock Aitken Waterman (SAW) production team. The recording was marked by tension and clashes between band and producers, which audio engineer Phil Harding alleges almost escalated to violence. Youthquake was re-released in the UK on compact disc (CD) in 1994, with the two bonus tracks that were previously included on the original CD (Note: Original European CD copies were manufactured in Japan and were un-barcoded.) and cassette versions of the album.

The album peaked at No. 9 on the UK Albums Chart and was certified gold by the British Phonographic Industry (BPI) for sales of over 100,000 copies. It also peaked at No. 31 on the US Billboard 200 and was certified gold by the Recording Industry Association of America (RIAA) for sales over 500,000. In Canada, the album peaked at No. 8 and was certified platinum. The album cover was taken by the Peruvian fashion and portrait photographer Mario Testino.

== Critical reception ==
Upon its release the album received a mixed reception. Smash Hits Ian Cranna gave the album a favourable 8 out 10 rating, but criticised the album's production which he found too often relegated the songs and the vocals to the background in favour of "emotionless, clattering computer rhythms. Played loud, virtually every track could be a dancefloor favourite or potential hit: played at home, it takes ages for the songs to come through their unsympathetic surroundings."

In an unfavourable review for Rolling Stone, Rob Tannenbaum wrote: "With layers of sleek sequencers and static percussion invoking the locked dance groove of disco, Youthquake maintains a high energy pace best suited for aerobics. Because without the dynamic production or provocative lyrics or even plain old good singing that recommend the best of its peers, this LP is like a night at Area – initially entertaining, occasionally sexy, but very suddenly a bore."

== Track listing ==
1985 LP and US CD
No.	Title	Length
1.	"You Spin Me Round (Like a Record)"	3:20
2.	"I Wanna Be a Toy"	3:57
3.	"DJ Hit That Button"	3:27
4.	"In Too Deep"	4:09
5.	"Big Daddy of the Rhythm"	3:24
6.	"Cake and Eat It"	4:41
7.	"Lover Come Back to Me"	3:07
8.	"My Heart Goes Bang"	3:10
9.	"It's Been a Long Time"	8:02

1985 cassette and Europe CD
No.	Title	Length
1.	"You Spin Me Round (Like a Record)"	3:20
2.	"I Wanna Be a Toy"	3:57
3.	"DJ Hit That Button"	3:27
4.	"In Too Deep"	4:09
5.	"Big Daddy of the Rhythm"	3:24
6.	"You Spin Me Round (Like a Record)" (Performance Mix)	7:25
7.	"Cake and Eat It"	4:41
8.	"Lover Come Back to Me"	3:07
9.	"My Heart Goes Bang"	3:10
10.	"It's Been a Long Time"	8:02
11.	"Lover Come Back to Me" (Extended Mix)	5:24

== Personnel ==
Dead or Alive

- Pete Burns – lead and backing vocals; melodica (on track 2)
- Mike Percy – synthesisers, electric guitar; bass guitar
- Tim Lever – synthesizers, sequencer, sampler, electric guitar, saxophone; backing vocals
- Steve Coy – drum machines, percussion; backing vocals

Production and artwork

- Mike Stock – producer
- Pete Waterman – producer
- Matt Aitken – producer
- Phil Harding – engineer; mixing
- Satori – design
- Mario Testino – photography

== Chart performance ==
Chart performance for Youthquake
Chart (1985)	Peak position
Australian Albums (Kent Music Report)	17
Canada Top Albums/CDs (RPM)	8
Dutch Albums (Album Top 100)	37
Finnish Albums Chart	26
German Albums (Offizielle Top 100)	24
Italian Albums Chart	18
New Zealand Albums (RMNZ)	43
Japanese Albums (Oricon)	31
Swedish Albums (Sverigetopplistan)	29
Swiss Albums (Schweizer Hitparade)	10
UK Albums (Official Charts)	9
US Billboard 200	31

== Certifications ==
Certifications for Youthquake
Region	Certification	Certified units/sales
Canada (Music Canada)	Platinum	100,000^{^}
United Kingdom (BPI)	Gold	100,000^{^}
United States (RIAA)	Gold	500,000^{^}
^{^} Shipments figures based on certification alone.
