= I Idolize You (Massive Ego song) =

Single by Massive Ego
- Released: 15 August 2011
- Genre: Darkwave, industrial
- Label: Public Disordar
- Songwriter(s): Marc Massive and Andy Thirwall

Massive Ego singles chronology
"Sex Drive" (2009)	"I Idolize You" (2011)	"Dead Silence" (2013)

"I Idolize You" is the fifth single from British Darkwave band Massive Ego. It was written by Massive and Thirwall. It was the first release for the band on Marc Massive's own independent label, Public Disordar Records, on 15 August 2011. The single marked the departure from the Hi-NRG, Eurodance sound of the band's previous releases.

== Background ==
The video for "I Idolize You" was filmed by Bambi Fantastic and directed by Massive and Frost. It features the SuicideGirls model Honey Manko, who later modelled for the cover of the Beautiful Suicide album.

"Devil in Disguise" was written for the band by Australian production team, T1 Music and originally recorded for their second album, but was later released on the single as a B-side. On 9 July 2013, it was released as a digital-only single via the Public Disordar Bandcamp.(

The Modification Mix, done by Lloyd Price of Sigue Sigue Sputnik, was just the sound that Massive was looking for. Price later joined the band in 2015.

== Versions and remixes ==
There have been ten different variations of "I Idolize You":

- The original single version
- Modification Mix by Lloyd Price
- Dirty Solar Nite Mix
- Afterburner Remix
- Modification Edit by Lloyd Price (Noise in the Machine)
- Aesthetic Perfection Remix (Noise in the Machine)
- Leæther Strip Remix (Noise in the Machine)
- Sawtooth Remix (Released as a free download via SoundCloud)
- Envious Mix by Benjamin'sPlague (Released as a free download via SoundCloud)
- Orchestral Epilogue by Scot Collins (Beautiful Suicide)

== Track listing ==
No.	Title	Length
1.	"I Idolize You"	4:38
2.	"I Idolize You" (LP's Modification Mix)	6:01
3.	"I Idolize You" (Dirty Solar Nite Mix)	5:55
4.	"I Idolize You" (Afterburner Remix)	4:29
5.	"Devil in Disguise"	3:18

== Credits and personnel ==
- Written by Marc Massive and Andy Thirwall
- Vocals: Marc Massive
- Written by Peter Wilson and Chris Richards (Track 5)
- Backing vocals: Tara Oldfield and Peter Wilson (Track 5)
- Remix: Lloyd Price (Track 2)
- Remix: Dirty Solar (Track 3)
- Remix: Flemming Jensby (Sappy) (Track 4)
- Mastering: Peter Maher
- Photography: Bambi Fantastic
