= Lover Come Back to Me (Dead or Alive song) =

1985 single by Dead or Alive

Single by Dead or Alive

from the album Youthquake
- B-side: "Far Too Hard"
- Released: 12 April 1985
- Recorded: 1984
- Genre: Pop
- Length: 3:06
- Label: Epic
- Songwriters: Pete Burns; Mike Percy; Tim Lever; Steve Coy
- Producer: Stock Aitken Waterman

Dead or Alive singles chronology
"You Spin Me Round (Like a Record)" (1984)	"Lover Come Back to Me" (1985)	"In Too Deep" (1985)

Music video
- "Lover Come Back to Me” on YouTube

"Lover Come Back to Me" is a 1985 single by the English pop band Dead or Alive, produced by Stock Aitken Waterman. It was released as the second single from the band's second studio album, Youthquake. The single peaked at No. 11 on the UK singles chart, No. 3 in South Africa, No. 5 in Switzerland, No. 21 in Germany, No. 13 in Australia and No. 75 on the US Billboard Hot 100.

In addition to the standard 7" and 12" formats, a fan-shaped picture disc was also released in the UK. The B-side to the single was "Far Too Hard", a song from the band's debut studio album Sophisticated Boom Boom. As with "You Spin Me Round (Like a Record)", the song was re-recorded in 2003 for the band's retrospective compilation album Evolution: The Hits.

== Critical reception ==
The single generally received positive reviews, being described as "appealing" by Ira Robbins of Trouser Press while Ned Raggett of AllMusic said, "When Burns commands at the end of the chorus, 'Kick it right down, right down!' it's as memorable as mass media pop of any stripe ever gets."

== Track listing ==
UK 7"
No.	Title	Length
1.	"Lover Come Back to Me"	3:08
2.	"Far Too Hard"	4:32

UK 12"
No.	Title	Length
1.	"Lover Come Back to Me (Extended Remix)"	5:50
2.	"Far Too Hard"	4:32
3.	"Lover Come Back to Me (7" Version)"	3:08

== Charts ==
Weekly chart performance for "Love Come Back to Me"
Chart (1985)	Peak position
Australia (Kent Music Report)	13
Canada RPM Top Singles	95
Finland (Suomen virallinen lista)	21
Ireland (IRMA)	6
Italy (FIMI)	24
Japan (Oricon Singles Chart)	9
Luxembourg (Radio Luxembourg)	8
Netherlands (Single Top 100)	30
South Africa (Springbok Radio)	3
Switzerland (Schweizer Hitparade)	5
UK (OCC)	11
US Billboard Hot 100	75
US Billboard Hot Dance Club Play	13
West Germany (Media Control Charts)	21
