= Andie Airfix =

British graphic designer

- Born: 27 August 1946; Warrington, England
- Died: 10 October 2018 (aged 72); United Kingdom
- Occupation: Graphic designer
- Notable work: Album, CD and DVD covers

Andie Airfix (27 August 1946 – 10 October 2018) was a British graphic designer who created album covers for Black Sabbath, Def Leppard, Judas Priest, Metallica, Philip Lynott, the Rolling Stones, Guns N' Roses, Paul McCartney, Dead or Alive and Thompson Twins, among many others under his own company Satori.

Andie Airfix catalogued his graphic design experience in his blog “B*b G*ld*ph stole my sunglasses? A Guide to Graphic design as an extreme sport”.

Airfix died after a short illness on 10 October 2018 at the age of 72. Airfix's death was announced on 17 October via his social media accounts. His cause of death has not been revealed.
