= Mad, Bad and Dangerous to Know (Dead or Alive album) =

Studio album by Dead or Alive
- Released: 21 November 1986
- Recorded: 1986
- Genres: Dance-pop; Hi-NRG
- Length: 40:58
- Label: Epic
- Producer: Stock Aitken Waterman

Dead or Alive chronology
Youthquake (1985)	Mad, Bad and Dangerous to Know (1986)	Rip It Up (1987)

Singles from Mad, Bad and Dangerous to Know
- 1. "Brand New Lover" Released: 12 September 1986; 2. "Something in My House" Released: 29 December 1986; 3. "Hooked on Love" Released: 23 March 1987; 4. "I'll Save You All My Kisses" Released: 28 September 1987; 5. "Son of a Gun" Released: January 1988 (Japan)

Professional ratings
Review scores
Source	Rating
Smash Hits	6.5/10

Mad, Bad and Dangerous to Know is the third studio album by the English pop band Dead or Alive, released in December 1986 by Epic Records. Continuing their association with the Stock Aitken Waterman (SAW) production team, Dead or Alive scored several hit singles from this album, including "Brand New Lover" and "Something in My House". In addition to an image of lead vocalist Pete Burns, the cover features one of the game walls at the Château de Raray, where some of the scenes for La Belle et la Bête (1946) were filmed. The cover photography was by Bob Carlos Clarke. The phrase "Mad, Bad, and Dangerous to Know" itself comes from a statement by Lady Caroline Lamb describing controversial English literary figure Lord Byron.

Production of the album was marked by arguments between the band and SAW, with the latter frustrated by the band's refusal to branch into house music, and lead vocalist Pete Burns' unwillingness to hand over songwriting duties to the producers. Burns expressed frustration with his record company's attitude to his single choices, complaining the label only relented on scheduling "Brand New Lover" for release after Bananarama had a hit with their Dead or Alive-inspired cover of "Venus", and alleging they also refused to give "Something in My House" a Halloween release date.

While Burns claimed vicious studio arguments during production of the album made him ill, audio engineer Karen Hewitt stated the singer appeared to thrive on his often explosive and confrontational dynamic with Mike Stock and Matt Aitken during the album sessions. Fellow album engineer Yoyo described tensions as mostly good humoured and centred on artistic disagreements, rather than personal animosity.

== Track listing ==
Side one

1. "Brand New Lover" – 5:18
2. "I'll Save You All My Kisses" – 3:35
3. "Son of a Gun" – 4:15
4. "Then There Was You" – 3:45
5. "Come Inside" – 4:28

Side two

1. "Something in My House" – 7:20
2. "Hooked on Love" – 3:55
3. "I Want You" – 4:12
4. "Special Star" – 4:10

== Personnel ==
Dead or Alive

- Pete Burns – vocals
- Mike Percy – bass guitar; guitars
- Tim Lever – keyboards
- Steve Coy – drums

Additional personnel

- Mike Stock – producer
- Pete Waterman – producer
- Matt Aitken – producer
- Mark McGuire – engineer
- Burni Adams – tape operator

== Chart performance ==
Chart (1987)	Peak position
Australian (Kent Music Report)	37
Canada Top 100 Albums	52
Finnish Album Chart	14
Japanese Oricon Albums Chart	19
Sweden Top 60 Albums	21
UK Top 75 Albums	27
US Billboard 200	52
