= Scarlet Fantastic =

British pop band

- Origin: United Kingdom
- Genre: Dance-pop
- Years active: 1987–1991, 2016–present
- Label: Arista
- Spinoff of: Swans Way
- Members: Maggie De Monde
- Past members: Rick P. Jones

Scarlet Fantastic are a British pop act, originally active in the 1980s as a duo consisting of Maggie K. De Monde and Rick P. Jones. The duo were former members of pop trio Swans Way, who had a hit with "Soul Train" in 1984. Scarlet Fantastic reached the top 40 of the UK Singles Chart only once, with the October 1987 single "No Memory", a song which would become popular a few years later on the rave and Ibiza dance music scenes.

Since "No Memory" was a hit, De Monde has performed with her band the Mighty K, released the album Union as part of the duo Maggie & Martin, and has made guest appearances on various projects including Empire State Human and glean.

In 2016, De Monde resurrected the Scarlet Fantastic name with the release of her album Reverie and the Beyond Pluto EP. In 2021, Scarlet Fantastic released the singles "Better Day" and "Make Way for Love" (produced by HiFi Sean Dickson of the Soup Dragons) as tasters for a new album with tracks co-written with John L. Walters of 1980s band Landscape. By 2025, Scarlet Fantastic had signed to Last Night from Glasgow with the album From Montreal to Rotherham released in March 2026.

== Discography ==
=== Albums ===
- 1987: 24 Hours (CD)
- 1988: 24 Hours (LP)
- 2011: 24 Hours (CD re-release)
- 2016: Reverie (CD)
- 2026: From Montreal to Rotherham (LP & CD)

=== Singles ===
- "No Memory" (1987), Arista - UK No. 24
- "Plug Me In (To the Central Love Line)" (1988) - UK No. 67
- "Film Star Kiss"
- "Stay"
- "No Memory 91" (1991)
- "Better Day" (2021)
- "Make Way for Love" (2021)
