= My Heart Goes Bang (Get Me to the Doctor) =

Single by Dead or Alive

from the album Youthquake
- B-side: "Big Daddy of the Rhythm" (live)
- Released: September 1985
- Recorded: 1985
- Genre: Hi-NRG • dance-pop
- Length: 3:13
- Label: Epic
- Songwriters: Pete Burns; Tim Lever; Mike Percy; Steve Coy
- Producer: Stock Aitken Waterman

Dead or Alive singles chronology
| "In Too Deep" (1985) | "My Heart Goes Bang (Get Me to the Doctor)" (1985) | "Brand New Lover" (1986) |

Music video
- "My Heart Goes Bang (Get Me to the Doctor)" on YouTube

"My Heart Goes Bang (Get Me to the Doctor)" is a 1985 song by the English pop band Dead or Alive. It was the fourth and final single from the band's second studio album Youthquake. It peaked at No. 23 on the UK singles chart, No. 12 in Japan, and became a dance hit in the U.S.

The original album version of the song was reworked for its subsequent single release, receiving largely different instrumentation that closer resembled the band's earlier hit single You Spin Me Round (Like A Record).

Two 7" single mixes and two 12" extended remixes were released, including the "American 'Wipe-out'" mixes featuring additional, uncredited guitar by Matt Aitken. The single was then remixed a third time for Dead or Alive's compilation album, Rip It Up, released in the fall of 1987. "My Heart Goes Bang" was again remixed and re-recorded for Fragile (2000) and Unbreakable (2001) which were only available on Avex Trax in Japan.

The music video depicts lead singer Pete Burns in a leather jacket on the back of a motorcycle, and the band walking down a catwalk.

== Track listing ==
UK 7"
| No. | Title | Length |
|---|---|---|
| 1. | "My Heart Goes Bang (Get Me to the Doctor)" (7" version) | 3:10 |
| 2. | "Big Daddy of the Rhythm" (live at the Hammersmith Odeon, July 1985) | 3:25 |

US 7"
| No. | Title | Length |
|---|---|---|
| 1. | "My Heart Goes Bang (Get Me to the Doctor)" (7" Wipe-out mix^{†}) | 3:31 |
| 2. | "Cake and Eat It" (fade-in intro) | 4:44 |

UK 12"
| No. | Title | Length |
|---|---|---|
| 1. | "My Heart Goes Bang (Get Me to the Doctor)" (Extended mix) | 7:20 |
| 2. | "Big Daddy of the Rhythm" (live at the Hammersmith Odeon, July 1985) | 3:25 |
| 3. | "My Heart Goes Bang (Get Me to the Doctor)" (7" version) | 3:10 |

UK 12" Limited Edition
| No. | Title | Length |
|---|---|---|
| 1. | "My Heart Goes Bang (Get Me to the Doctor)" (7" version) | 3:10 |
| 2. | "Big Daddy of the Rhythm" (live at the Hammersmith Odeon, July 1985) | 3:25 |
| 3. | "Cake and Eat It" (live at the Hammersmith Odeon, July 1985) | 5:35 |
| 4. | "In Too Deep" (live at the Hammersmith Odeon, July 1985) | 4:36 |

UK 12" (American 'Wipe-out' mix)
| No. | Title | Length |
|---|---|---|
| 1. | "My Heart Goes Bang (Get Me to the Doctor)" (American 'Wipe-out' mix) | 6:40 |
| 2. | "Big Daddy of the Rhythm" (live at the Hammersmith Odeon, July 1985) | 3:25 |
| 3. | "My Heart Goes Bang (Get Me to the Doctor)" (instrumental version) | 4:31 |

US 12" (American 'Wipe-out' mix)
| No. | Title | Length |
|---|---|---|
| 1. | "My Heart Goes Bang (Get Me to the Doctor)" (American 'Wipe-out' mix^{††}) | 6:19 |
| 2. | "My Heart Goes Bang (Get Me to the Doctor)" (Extended mix) | 7:20 |

=== Notes ===
^{†} Exclusive to the U.S.

^{††} Edited to 6:19 from the original UK 12" release.

== Charts ==
| Chart (1985–1986) | Peak position |
|---|---|
| Australia (Kent Music Report) | 41 |
| France (SNEP) | 32 |
| Ireland (IRMA) | 21 |
| Japan (Oricon Singles Chart) | 12 |
| Luxembourg (Radio Luxembourg) | 15 |
| South Africa (Springbok Radio) | 30 |
| UK (OCC) | 23 |
| US Billboard Hot Dance Club Play | 15 |
