= Culture in Dresden =

Overview of the culture in the German city of Dresden, Saxony

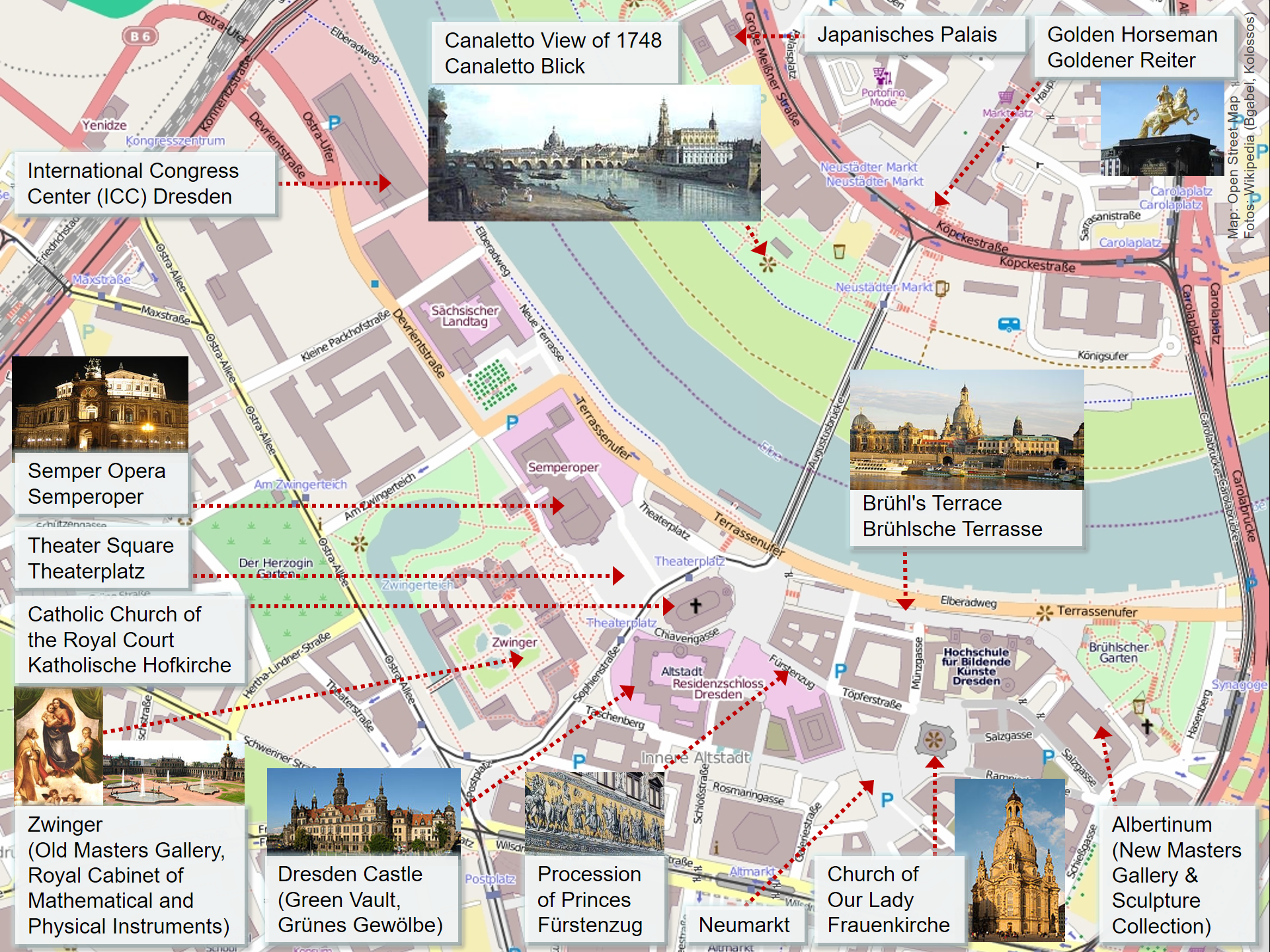
Main cultural sights in the historic city center of Dresden

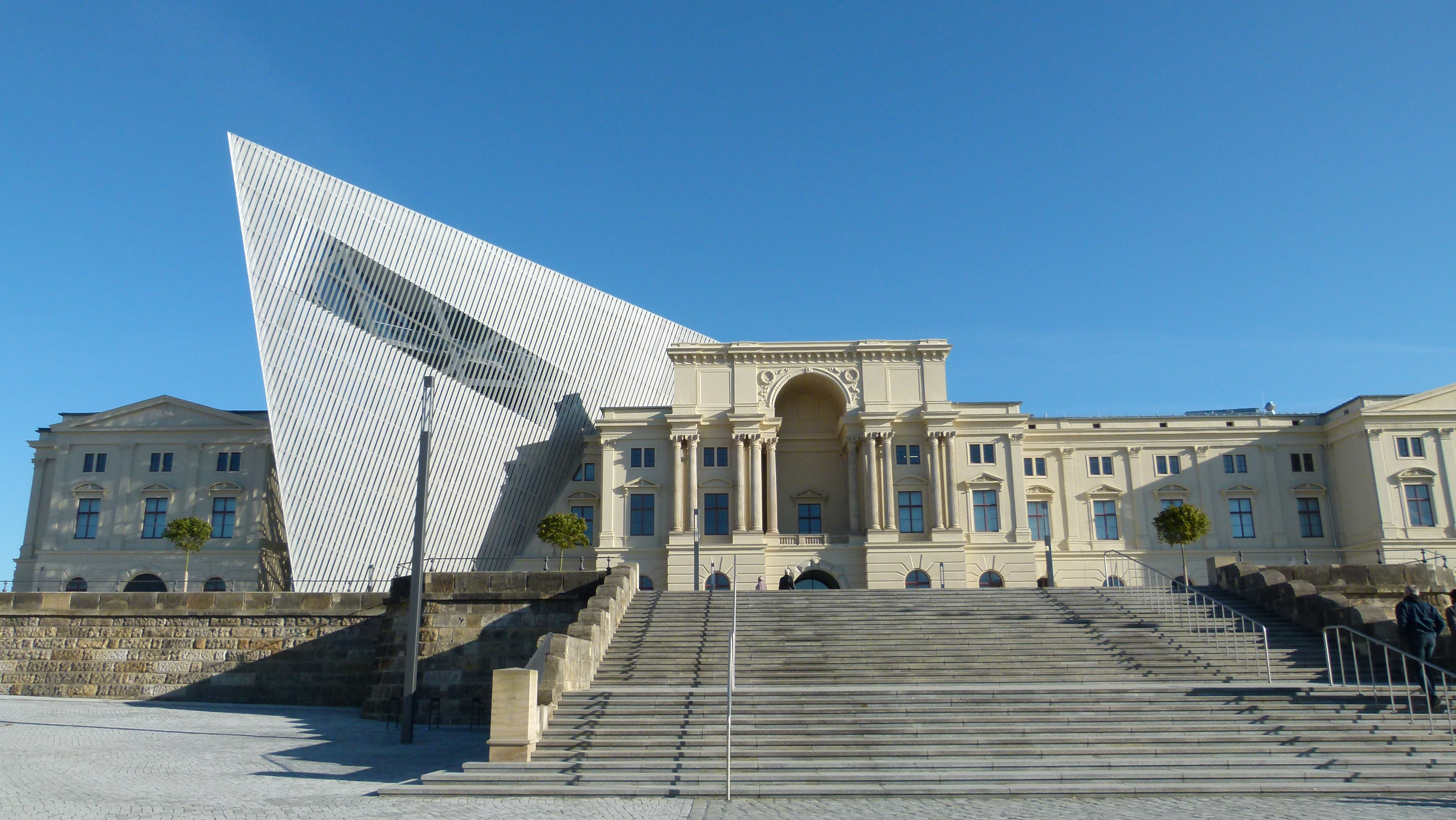
The Bundeswehr Military History Museum with the wedge designed by Daniel Libeskind

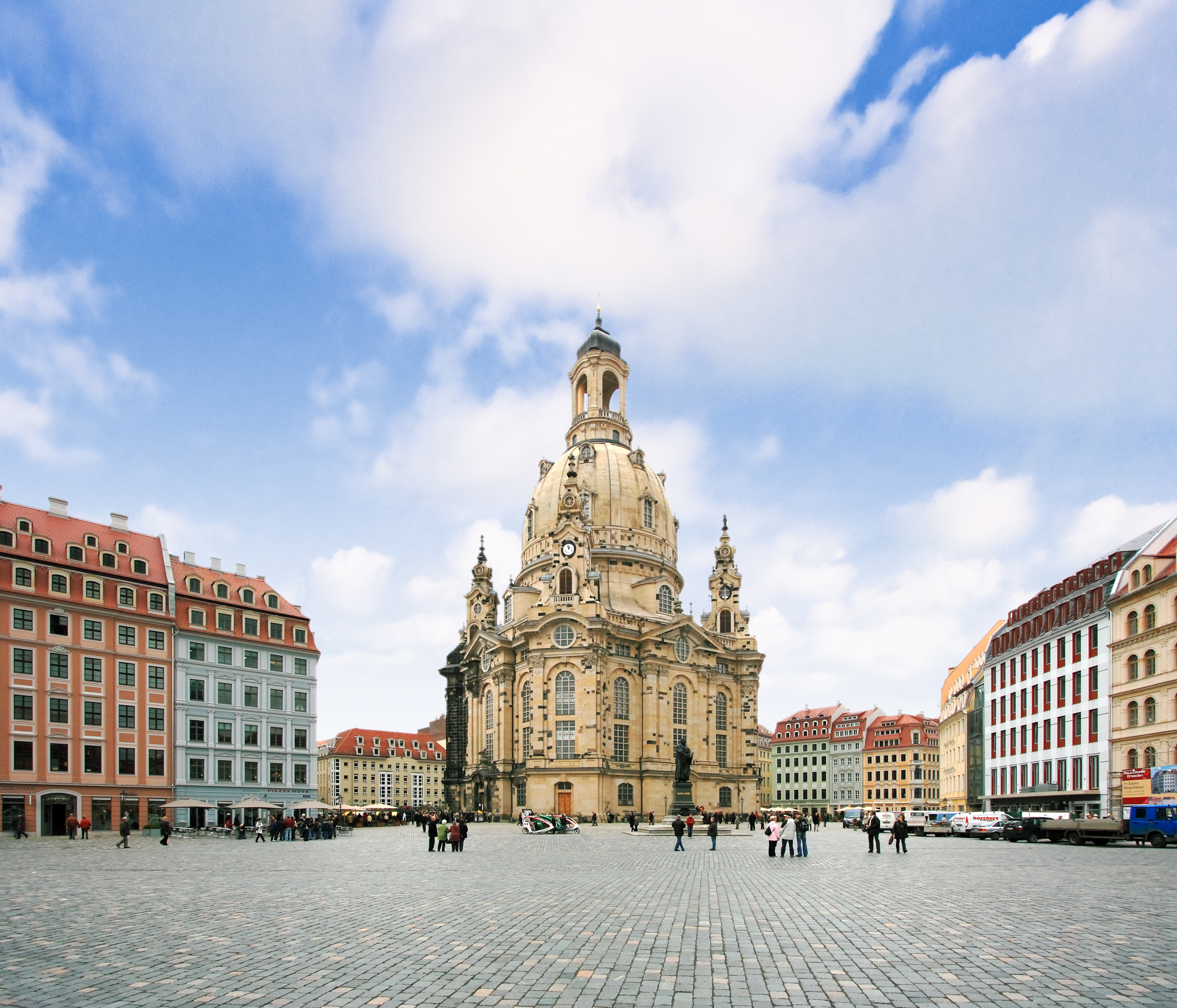
Dresden Frauenkirche with surrounding Neumarkt square

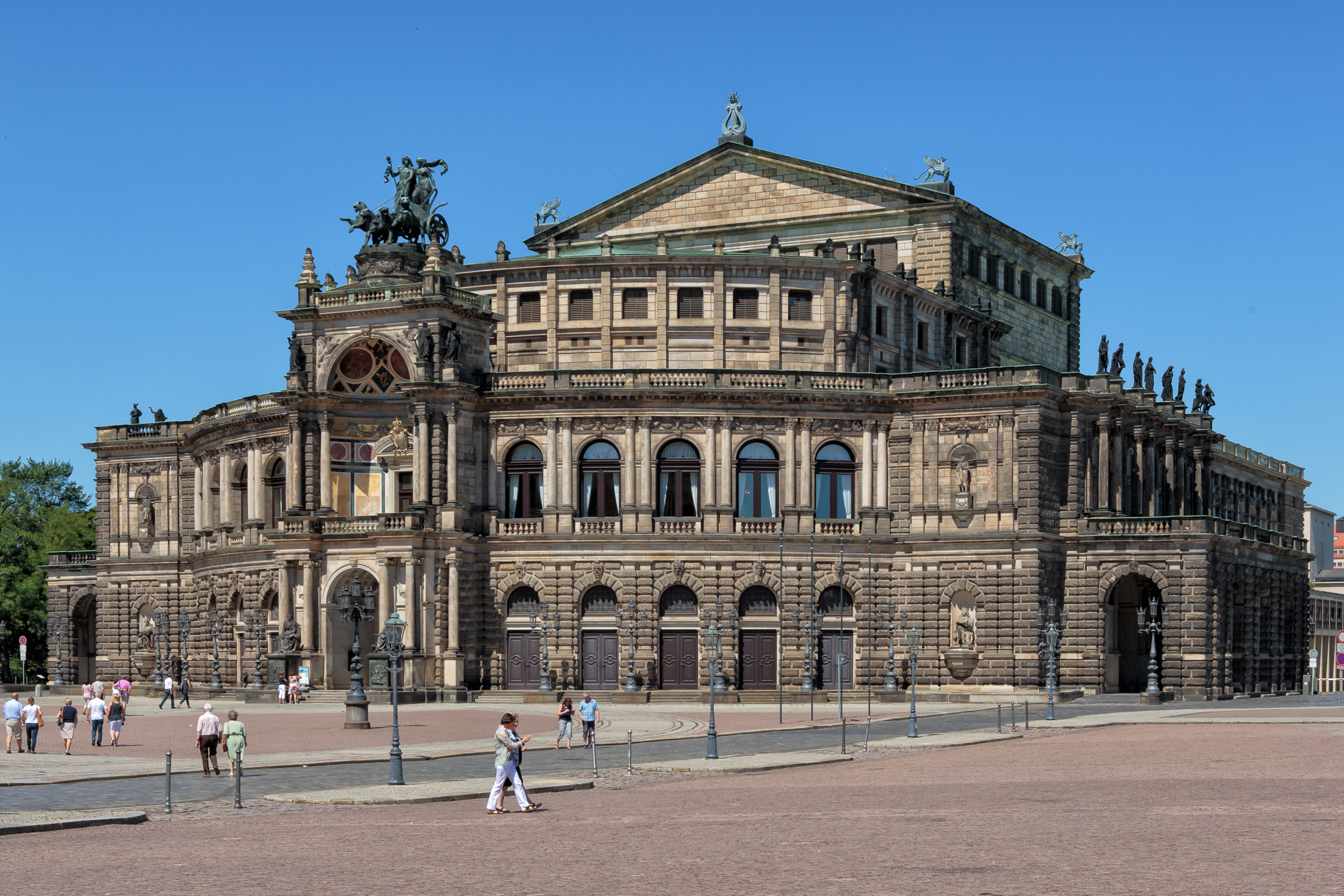
The Semperoper

Dresden is a cultural centre in Germany which has influenced the development of European culture. "It is [...] outstanding as a cultural landscape, an ensemble that integrates the celebrated Baroque setting and suburban garden city into an artistic whole within the river valley, and as an example of land use, representing an exceptional development of a major Central-European city."

Dresden is today reestablishing the cultural importance it held from the 19th century up until the 1920s when it was a centre of both fine and visual arts, architecture and music. During that period, famous artists such as Richard Wagner, Ernst Ludwig Kirchner, Otto Dix, Oskar Kokoschka, Richard Strauss, Gottfried Semper and Gret Palucca were active in the city. Dresden also is home to several important art collections, world-famous musical ensembles and significant buildings from various architectural periods, many of which were rebuilt after the destruction of the Second World War.

Nowadays Dresden once more attracts international artists such as Fabio Luisi, Daniel Libeskind and Norman Foster to work in and for the cultural life of the city.

== Musical ensembles ==
The Sächsische Staatskapelle Dresden is the orchestra of the Saxon State Opera and was founded in 1548. It is one of the oldest orchestras and is known as Strauss-Orchestra. Nevertheless the musical ensemble was also moulded by Carl Maria von Weber and Richard Wagner as its conductors.

The Dresdner Kreuzchor (Choir of The Cross) is a boy's choir. It consists of pupils of the Kreuzschule, which is a Gymnasium today; the Kreuzchor is the choir of the Kreuzkirche. Choir, church and school were first mentioned in the 13th century and are as old as the city of Dresden. The "Dresdner Kapellknaben" (which are not related to the Staatskapelle) are the choir of the Catholic cathedral.

The Dresden Philharmonic is the orchestra of the city of Dresden. It was founded in 1870, originally called the Gewerbehausorchestra, and renamed in 1915.

The Dresdner Sinfoniker is a symphony orchestra and a newcomer to the international musical ensembles in Dresden. The orchestra was founded in 1996 and became notable for its crossover of classic and modern music and for its cooperation with the Pet Shop Boys creating a soundtrack for the 1925 silent film Battleship Potemkin and releasing the album of that name.

La Folia Barockorchester is a chamber orchestra focused on compositions played at the Dresden court.

== Museums, presentations and collections ==
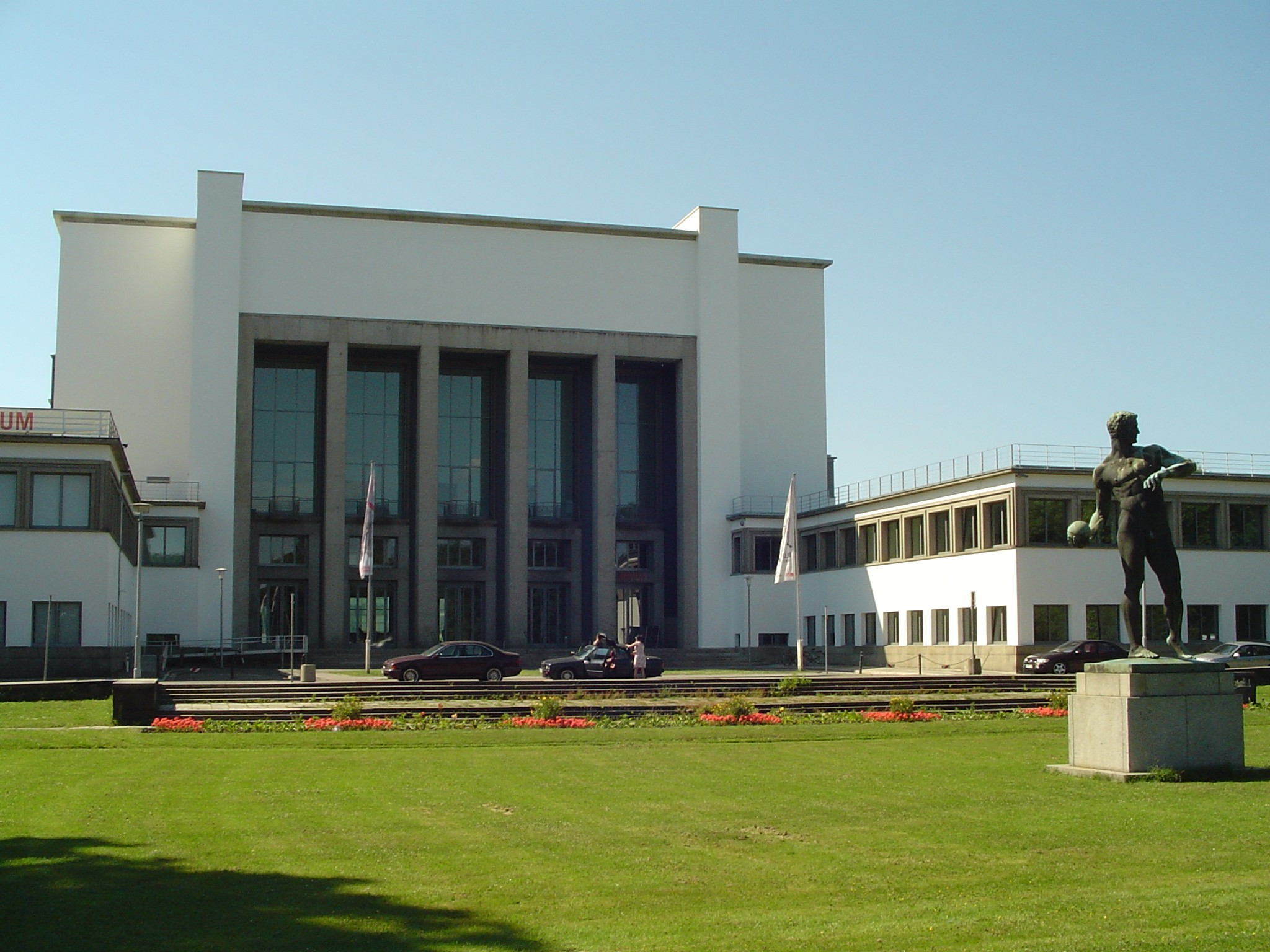
The German Hygiene Museum was built during the transition from Historicism to Modernism

Dresden hosts the renowned Staatlichen Kunstsammlungen Dresden (Dresden State Art Collections). The art collections consist of twelve museums, of which the Gemäldegalerie Alte Meister and the Grünes Gewölbe are the best known. This cultural institution is owned by the Free State of Saxony. Many of its museums are located in Dresden Castle and the Zwinger Palace. Some of the museums, such as the Mathematisch-Physikalischer Salon (Royal Cabinet of Mathematical and Physical Instruments), exhibit art within the context of technology, such as globes, measuring equipment and chronographs. Also known are Galerie Neue Meister (New Masters Gallery), Rüstkammer (Armoury) with the Turkish Chamber, and the Museum für Völkerkunde Dresden (Museum of Ethnology).

Other museums and collections owned by the Free State of Saxony in Dresden are:

- The Landesmuseum für Vorgeschichte (State Museum of Prehistory)
- The Staatliche Naturhistorische Sammlungen Dresden (State Collection of Natural History)
- The "Universitätssammlung Kunst + Technik" (Collection of Art and Technology of the Dresden University of Technology)
- Verkehrsmuseum Dresden (Transport Museum)

Dresden hosts the Bundeswehr Military History Museum in the former garrison in the Albertstadt. The book museum of the Saxon State Library presents the famous Dresden Codex.

The former convention house of the Farmer's Estate (called the Landhaus) is now the home of the Dresden City Museum, which exhibits a collection of historical objects and has a smaller collection of paintings. The city has some museums specialising in artists who lived in the city (for example the Carl-Maria-von-Weber-Museum and the Kügelgenhaus. Another museum, the Technische Sammlungen (Technical Collection) was established in the Pentacon building, the old factory where Praktika cameras were once built. The collection includes historic cameras, computing technology and entertainment technology.

The Deutsches Hygiene-Museum was founded for mass education in hygiene, health, human biology and medicine. It stood in context of the Dresden industry of medicine and hygiene products and was founded by the industrialist Karl August Lingner, who produced Odol hygiene products. The museum's Gläserne Frau, showing the organs of human beings as a see-through sculpture, became world famous. During Nazism, the museum diffused racist theories. A 1934 poster of the museum showed a man with distinctly African features and reads, "If this man had been sterilized there would not have been born ... 12 hereditarily diseased." (sic)

According to the current director Klaus Vogel, "The Hygiene Museum was not a criminal institute in the sense that people were killed here," but "it helped to shape the idea of which lives were worthy and which were worthless."

== Architecture ==
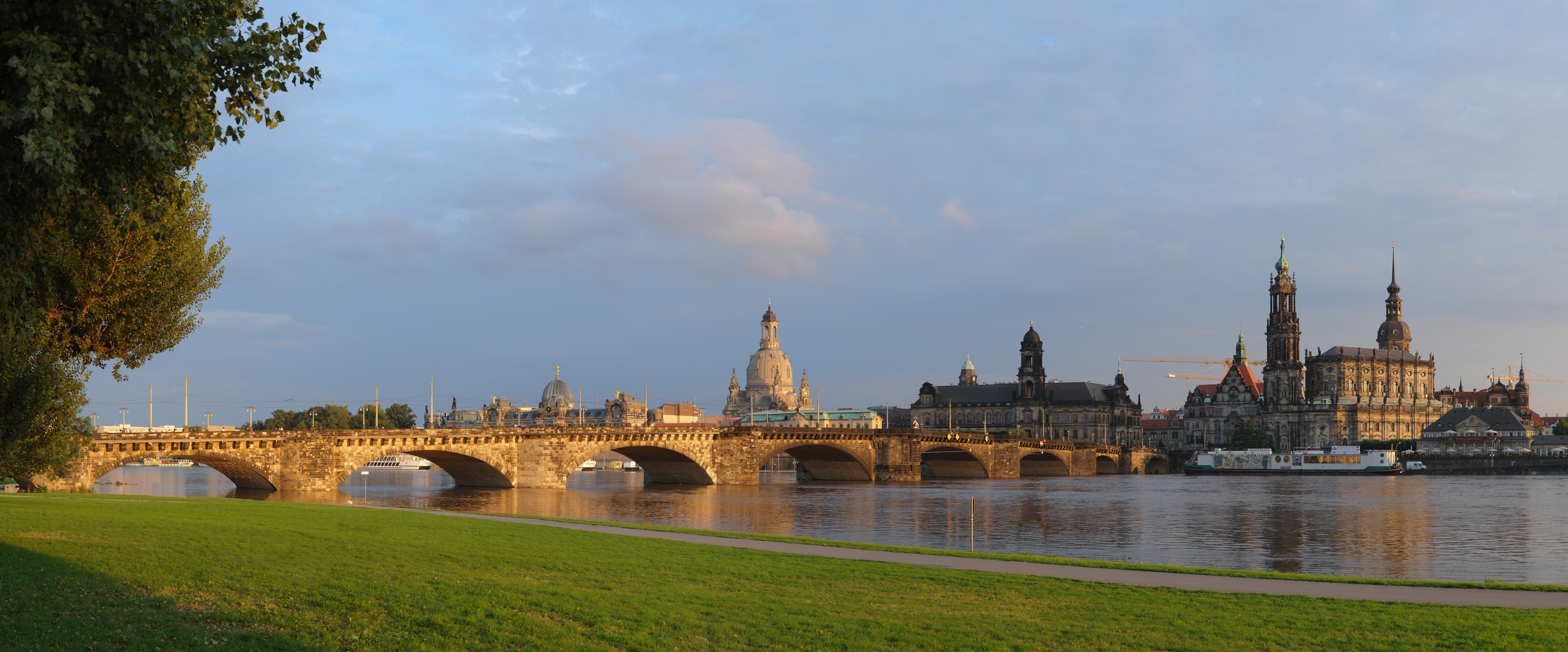
View over Dresden

Although Dresden is often said to be a Baroque city, its architecture is influenced by more than one style. Other eras of importance are the Renaissance and Historism as well as the contemporary styles of Modernism and Postmodernism.

=== Royal household ===
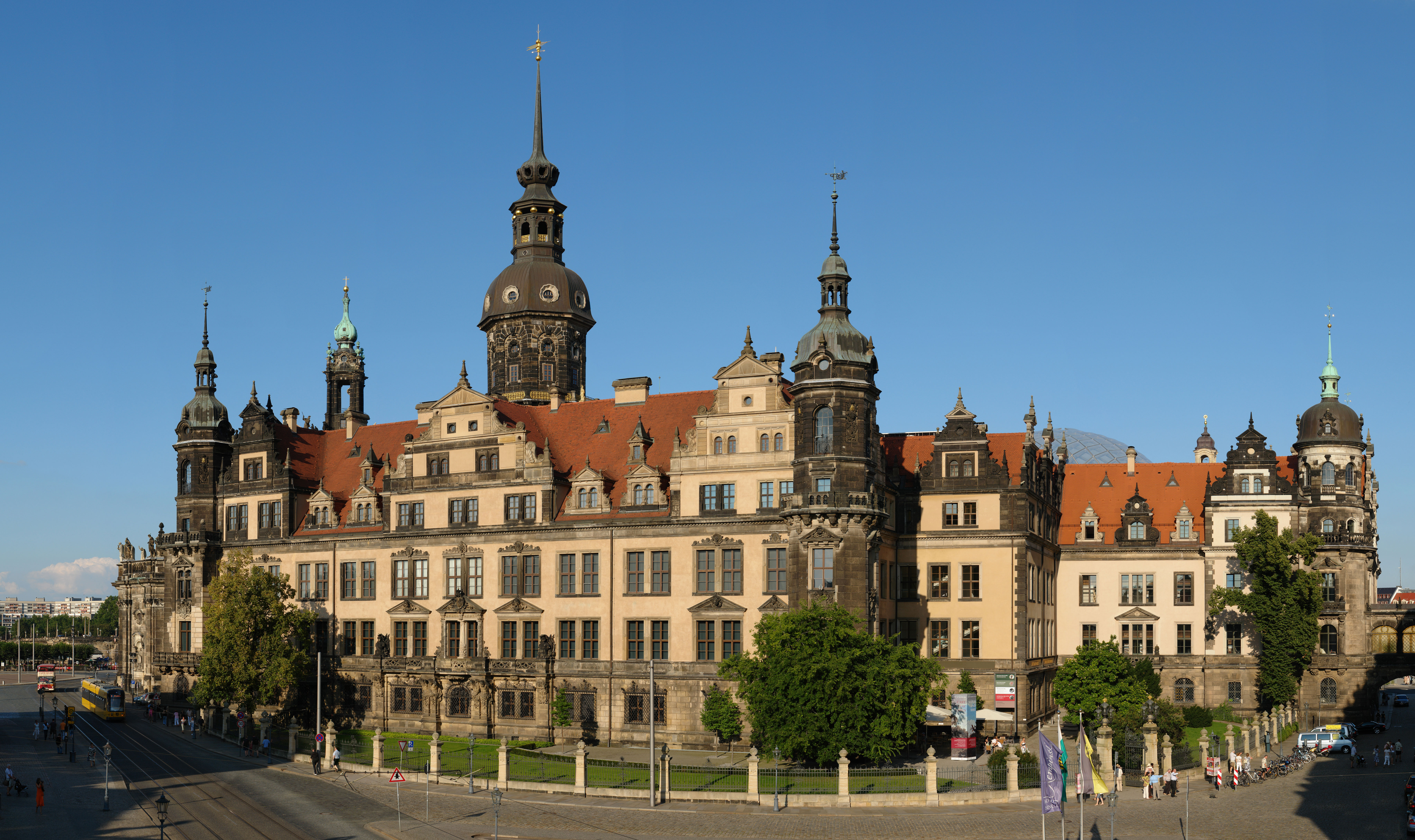
The Dresden Castle, one of the oldest buildings in Dresden

The royal buildings are among the most impressive buildings in Dresden. Dresden Castle was once the home of the royal household. The wings of the building have been renewed, built upon and restored many times. Due to this segued integration of styles, the castle includes elements of the Renaissance, Baroque and Classicist styles.

The Zwinger Palace is just across the road from the castle. It was built on the old stronghold of the city and was converted to a centre for the royal art collections and a place to hold festivals. Its gate (surmounted by a golden crown) by the moat is a notable part of the building.

Another notable site is also on the former city wall: Brühl's Terrace was a gift to Heinrich von Brühl and became an ensemble of buildings. It was opened to the public in the 19th century; previously the whole area had been reserved for the nobility. The ensemble includes the Albertinum, the Sächsisches Ständehaus and the Secundogenitur (home of the second son of the electors and kings).

August the Strong was very impressed by Venice with its Canal Grande and decided to model the Dresden Elbe Valley on this example using the Elbe's ample bends. Nevertheless he initiated the creation of a cultural landscape which became a World Heritage Site since 2004 and which differs from the Canal Grande with its meadows and forested yards. This landscape hosts vineyards not far away from the inner city. The World Heritage Site passes through almost the whole city. Due to conflicts involving a modern bridge to be built across the river at a sensitive spot, the site has been added to the list of endangered World Heritage sites.

Pillnitz Castle was built as a summer residence in the style of Chinoiserie alongside the Elbe on the southern side and the slopes and vineyards on the other.

=== Religious buildings ===
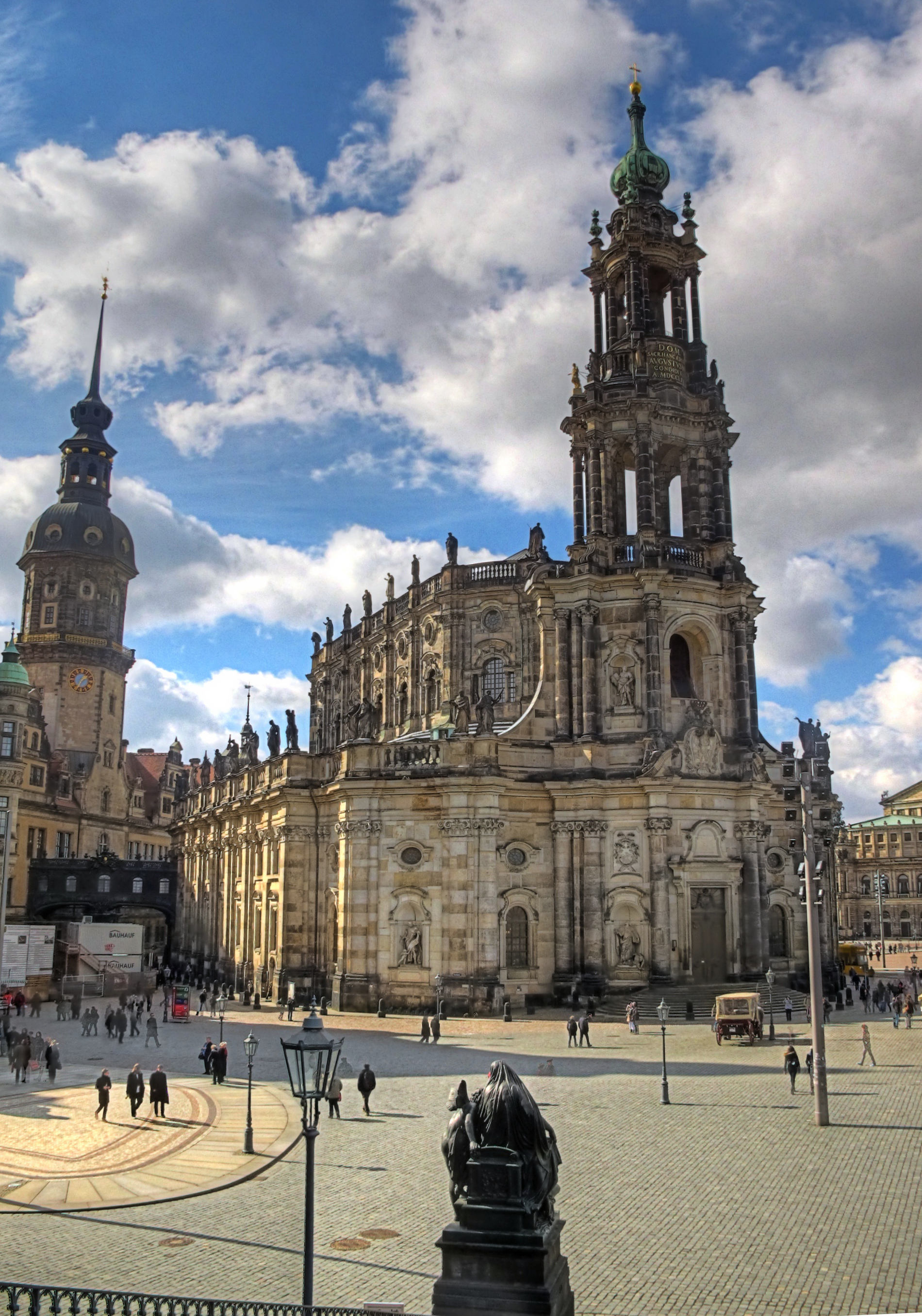
Dresden Cathedral

The Hofkirche was the church of the royal household. August the Strong, who wanted to become King of Poland, was forced to convert to the Catholic religion, as the Polish king had to be Catholic. At that time Dresden was strictly Protestant. August the Strong ordered the building of the Hofkirche (1739 to 1755) to establish a sign of religious importance in Dresden. The church is the cathedral "Sanctissimae Trinitatis" since 1980. The staggered facade is completed by two balustrades that are decorated width 74 statues of saints. The church hosts the crypt of the Wettin Dynasty.

The Frauenkirche was built by the citizens of Dresden between 1726 and 1743. It is said to be the greatest cupola building in central and northern Europe. Furthermore, the Frauenkirche is the largest church in Dresden, leading Dresden to be one of the few places where a cathedral is not the largest Christian sacral building. The basilica of Santa Maria della Salute in Venice is said to be a model for the Frauenkirche whose cupola was originally planned as a timber construction. During this period, architectural style in Dresden was significantly inspired by Venice, Florence and other landmarks in northern Italy.

The Kreuzkirche is another main church of the Protestants and is the oldest established church building of Dresden . The community of the Frauenkirche, which is in fact a few years older, was formerly located in the outskirts of the city. The Kreuzkirche has often been destroyed by conflagration and wars. The preserved style of architecture is that of the baroque edition supplemented by the elements of the Art Nouveau.

=== Contemporary architecture ===
Dresden has been an important site for the development of contemporary architecture for centuries, and this trend has extended into the 20th and 21st centuries.

Historicist buildings made their presence felt on the cityscape until the 1920s. One of the most recent buildings of that era is the Hygiene-Museum, which is designed in an impressively monumental style but employs plain facades and simple structures. It is often but wrongly attributed to the Bauhaus school.

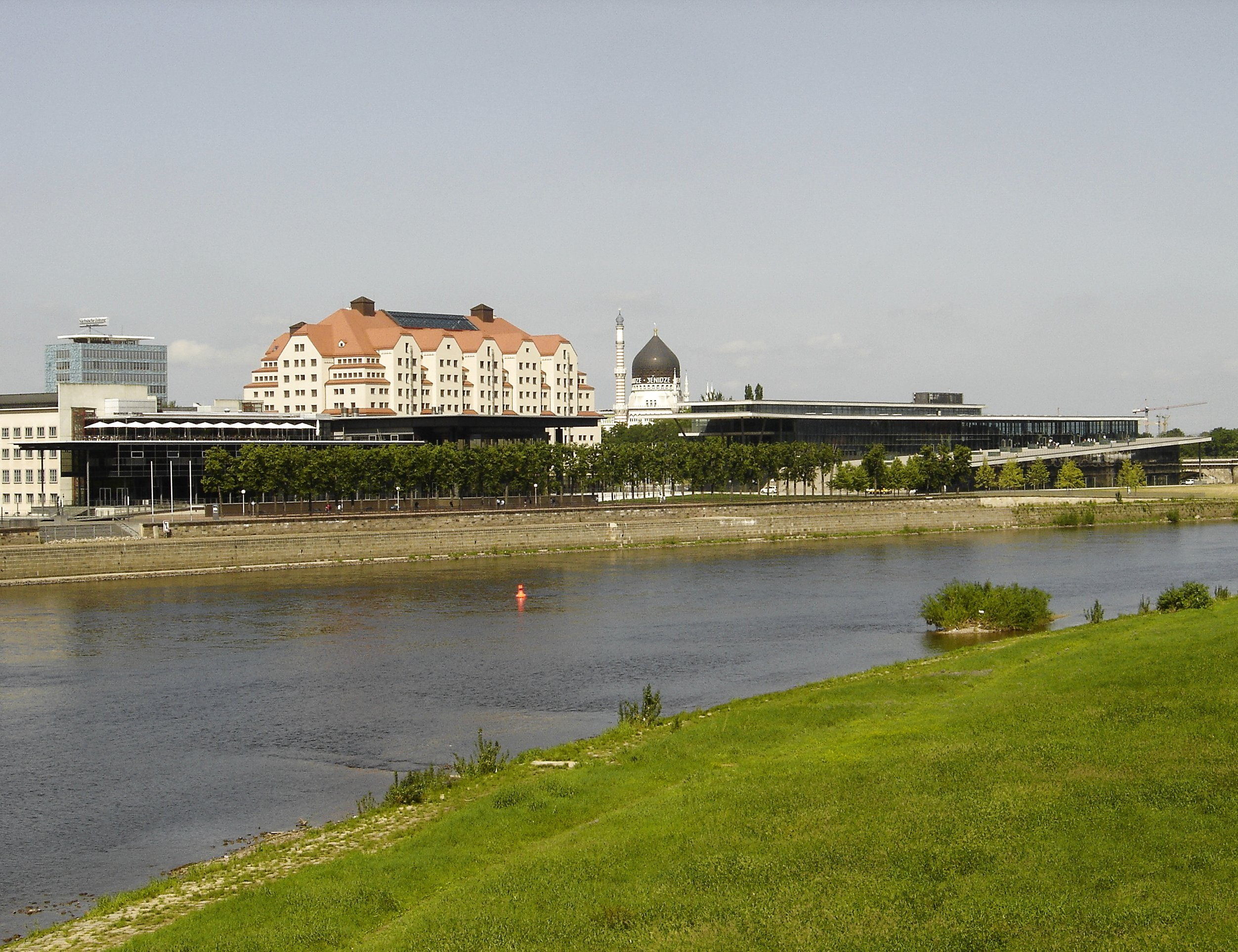
New Terrace (the Saxon State Parliament, the Erlweinspeicher and the Congress Center)

The architectural plans of the National Socialist regime for the city were not realised. As in Berlin, where Nazi architects planned the monumental restructuring of the city as "Germania, Capital of the World", large-scale buildings next to the Großer Garten park were meant to establish Dresden as a subsidiary, regional capital. Some of the contemporary buildings were found to be "un-German". Among them was the Kugelhaus (Globe House) which was torn down. Along with older constructions, many modern buildings were destroyed in the Second World War.

Most of the present cityscape of Dresden was built up after 1945, a mix of reconstructed or repaired old buildings and new buildings of the modern and postmodern styles of the second half of the 20th century.

Under the German Democratic Republic, Dresden was planned and reconstituted as a model socialist city. Streets were arranged to keep chimneys of industry in sight. Wide streets and squares were cut into the landscape. Central public spaces, such as the Altmarkt, were surrounded by neoclassical Socialist Realist structures of relatively high quality. Other structures were built with less sensitivity toward their historic or geographic context, for example the housing block at Prager Straße. Other buildings, including the Kulturpalast or the Centrum-Warenhaus (a large department store), represent the international style. Much of the new public architecture was influenced by public outcry and protest; the Kulturpalast, for example, was first planned as monumental tower like the Warsaw Palace of Culture and Science but arranged in a flatter form in context of the historic buildings.

After 1990 and German reunification, new styles emerged. The Saxon State Parliament was under construction until 1993 and uses the old part of the former financial ministry in combination with a new wing of glass and steel in classic modern style. It represents the beginning of the so-called New Terrace (extending Brühl's Terrace). The youngest building of that ensemble alongside the river Elbe is the International Congress Center Dresden which is a postmodern building mirroring motifs of the historic terrace and of the Elbe landscape.

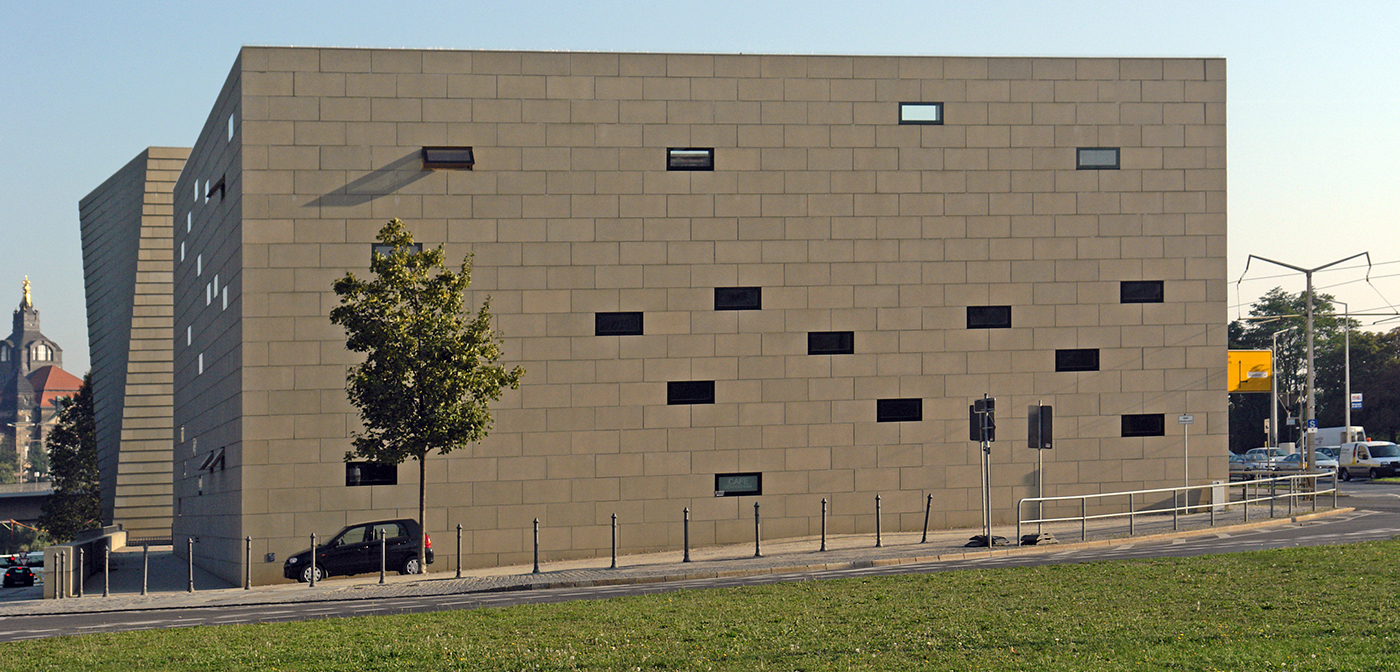
The New Synagogue

The New Synagogue, at the other end of the old city, is another award-winning contemporary structure. Built almost completely of stone, its vertical edges are sloped, to reflect Jewish religious rites.

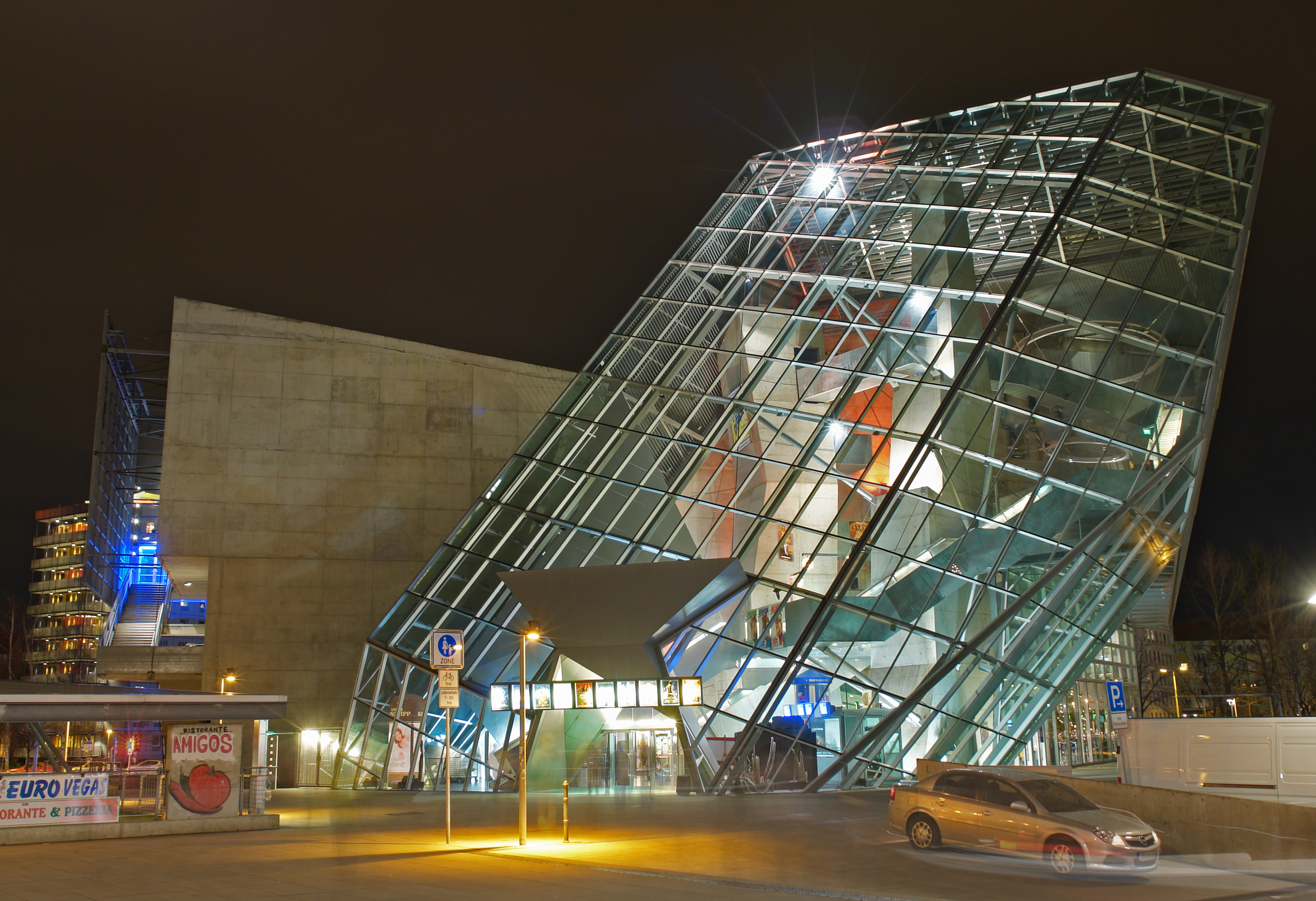
The locally controversial UFA-Palast

The nearby UFA-Kristallpalast cinema is a recent design by the firm Coop Himmelb(l)au. It is one of the largest deconstructivist buildings in Germany. Another deconstructivist project been planned for Dresden by Daniel Libeskind: the Military History Museum in the classicist Arsenal building which is currently under reconstruction. Libeskind has designed an arrow breaking through the building in the direction of the inner city, symbolising the flight formations during the bombardment of Dresden 1945— appropriate to the context of the military museum that has existed in that building since 1918. The transparent new facade is in foreground of the solid old facade and creates a contrast that emblematises open and democratic society and the new role of its armed forces in contrast to the historic past.

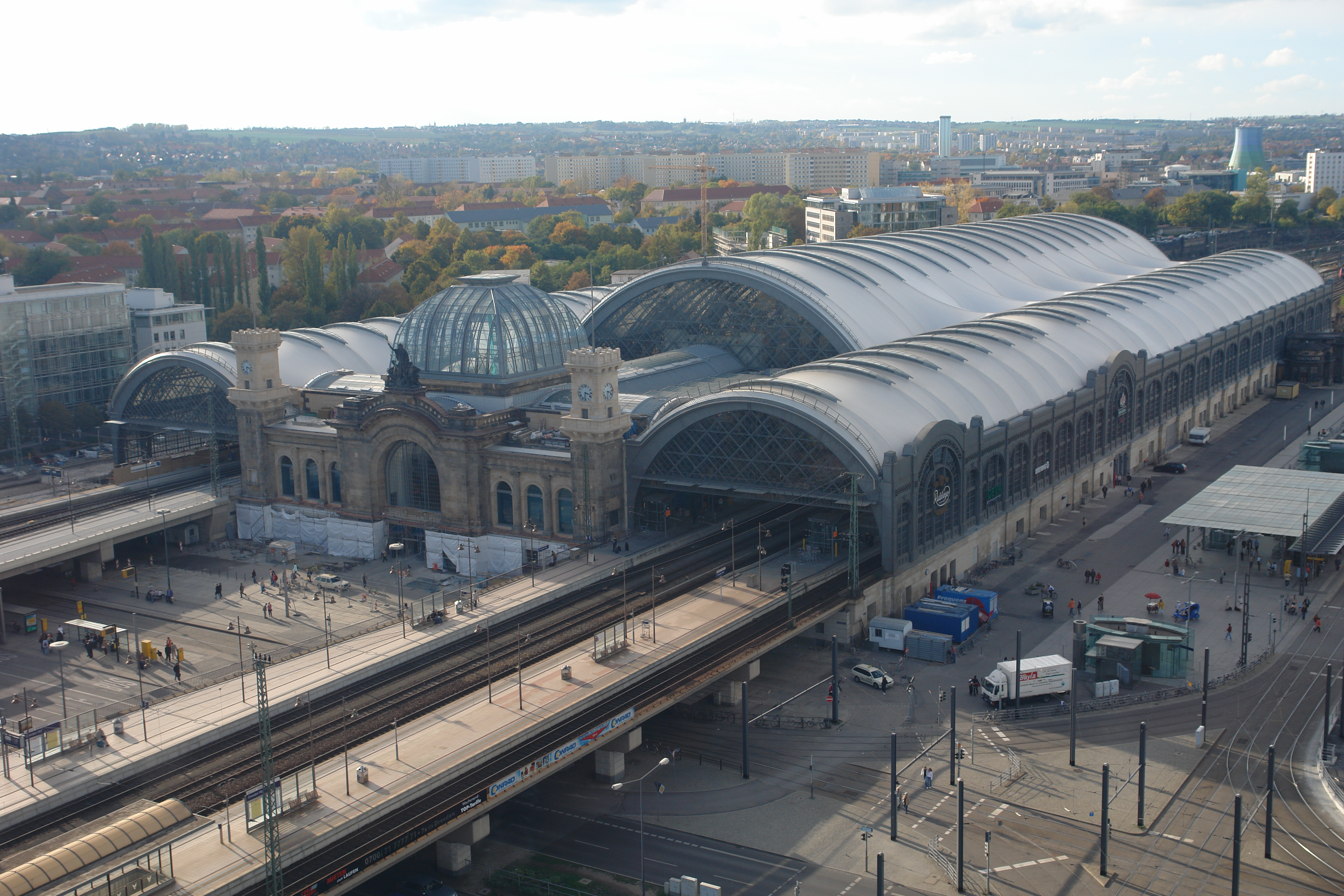
The roof of the Dresden Hauptbahnhof

Norman Foster is responsible for the final stage of the reconstruction of the Dresden Hauptbahnhof train station. He designed a new teflon roof using the old steel girders and a new glass cupola of the entrance hall. The large white housetop is a unique landmark that can be seen from many positions on the slopes above the Elbe valley.

The Saxon State Library was built between 1998 and 2002 on the campus of the Technische Universität Dresden. It is mainly underground, with two cuboids rising up from below. While the walls are of other substances, glass is used extensively in the roof portion of the building. The central reading room extends two stories underground.

=== Technical buildings ===
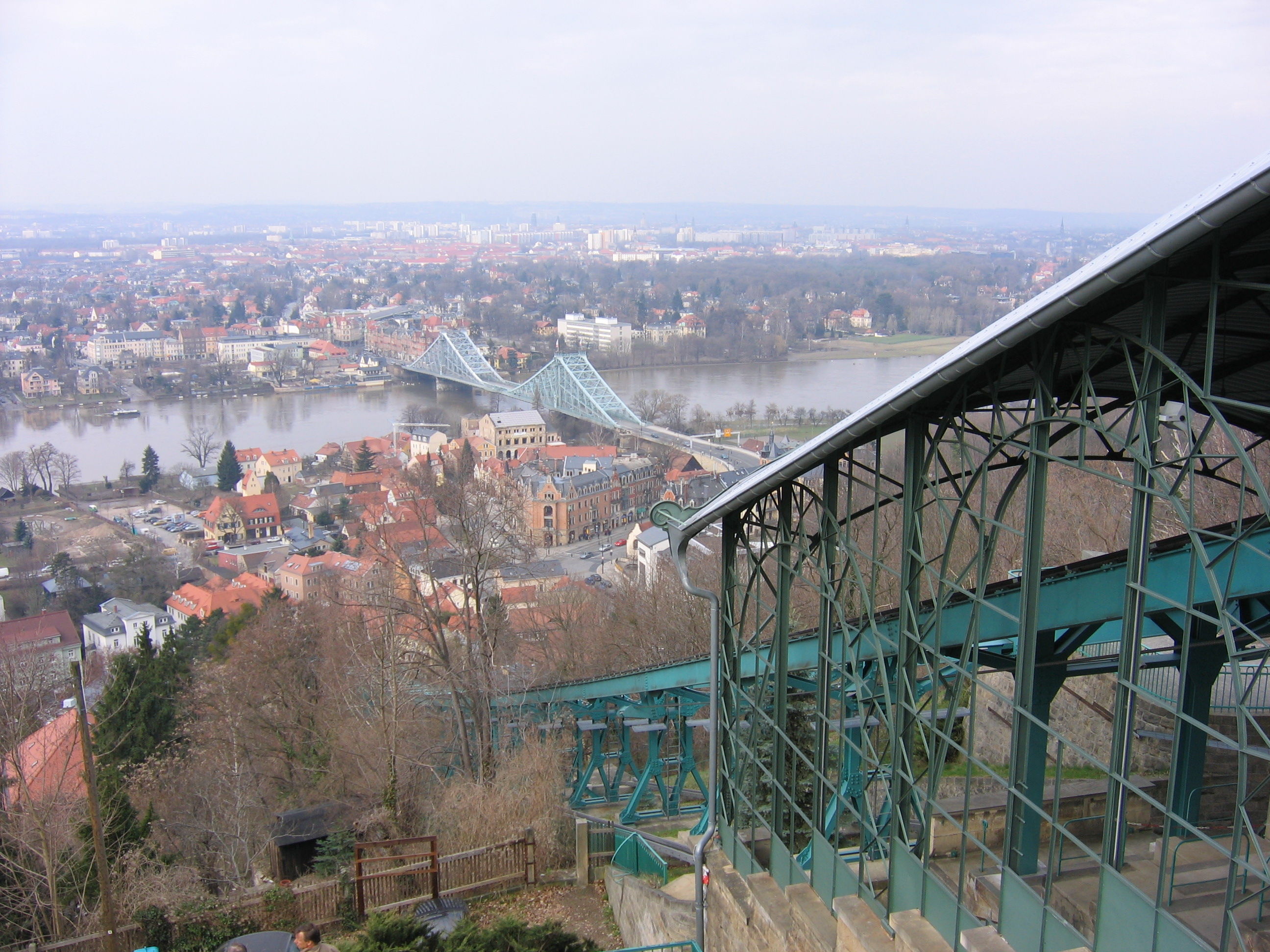
View over the Blue Wunder Elbe bridge from the upper station of the Schwebebahn Dresden suspension railway

Dresden is also known for some technical buildings. Most of them were built in the second half of the 19th century and at the beginning of the 20th century. Two areas where there are technical buildings are Schillerplatz and Körnerplatz. These two places are named after Friedrich Schiller and Carl Theodor Körner and are connected by the "Blue Wonder" Elbe bridge. This bridge is one of the oldest cantilever truss bridges in Germany. It is often said to be called a Wonder because it spans the river without a pillar or due to its colour, which is sometimes said to have changed from green to blue.

Nearby, two cable railways connect Körnerplatz with two villa quarters. The Standseilbahn Dresden is a funicular railway which travels up 95 metres and connects the districts of Loschwitz and Weißer Hirsch. The Schwebebahn Dresden is the oldest suspension railway in the world and connects the lower and upper parts of Loschwitz.

The city planner Hans Erlwein designed some industrial buildings in the city centre. His storage building near the Semperoper is adapted to neighbouring buildings by a dissected roof. Another building planned by Hans Erlwein is the slaughterhouse complex. This location became famous thanks to the novel Slaughterhouse-Five by Kurt Vonnegut.

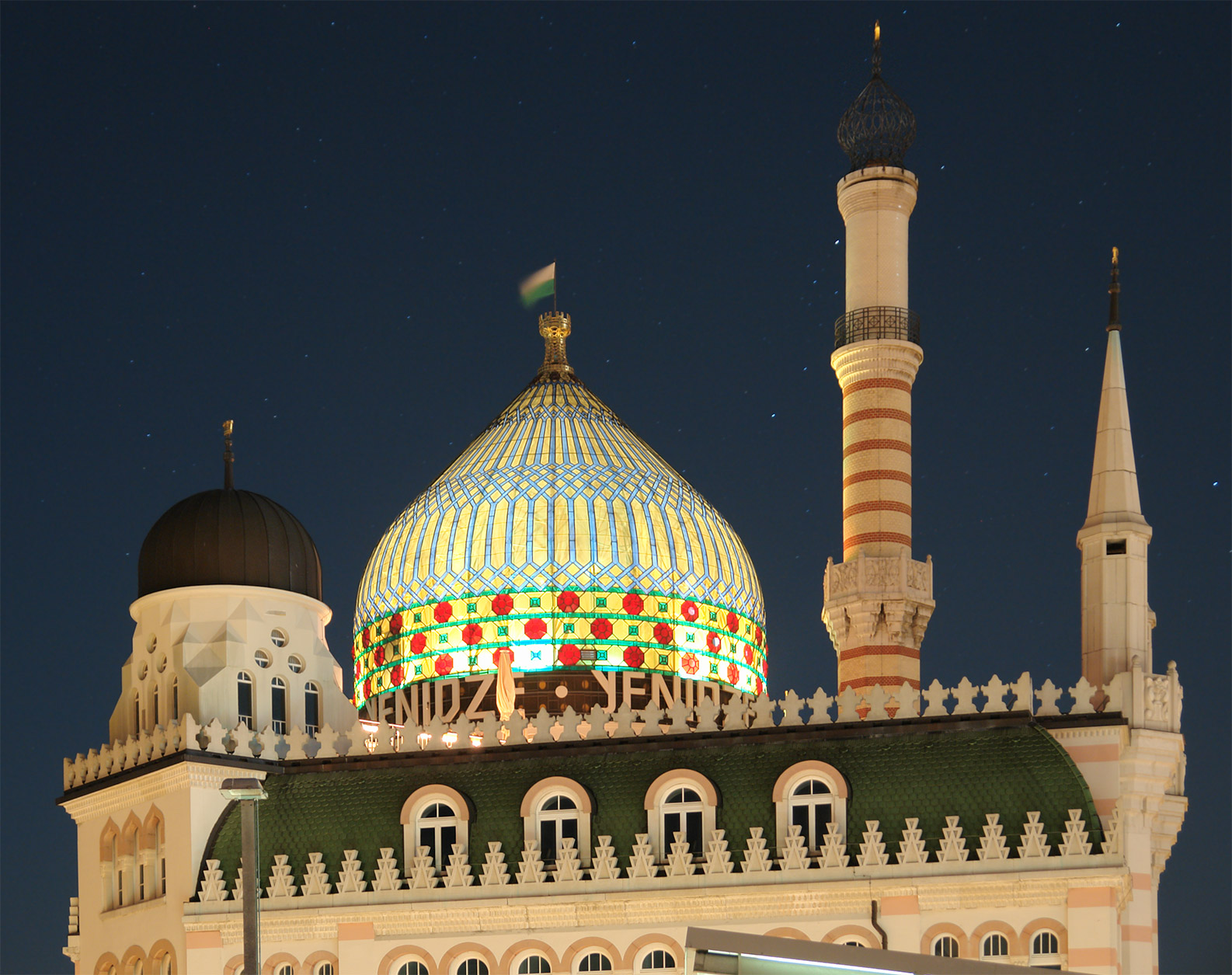
The Yenidze cigarette factory, built between 1908 and 1909

Another well-known technical building is the Yenidze which was built as a cigarette factory. Its architecture is greatly influenced by marketing and orientally designed in an Oriental style to bring to mind the countries where tobacco comes from. Even the chimneys are styled like minarets. At the time it was built, its architecture was controversial but today it is a listed building. It is used as offices.

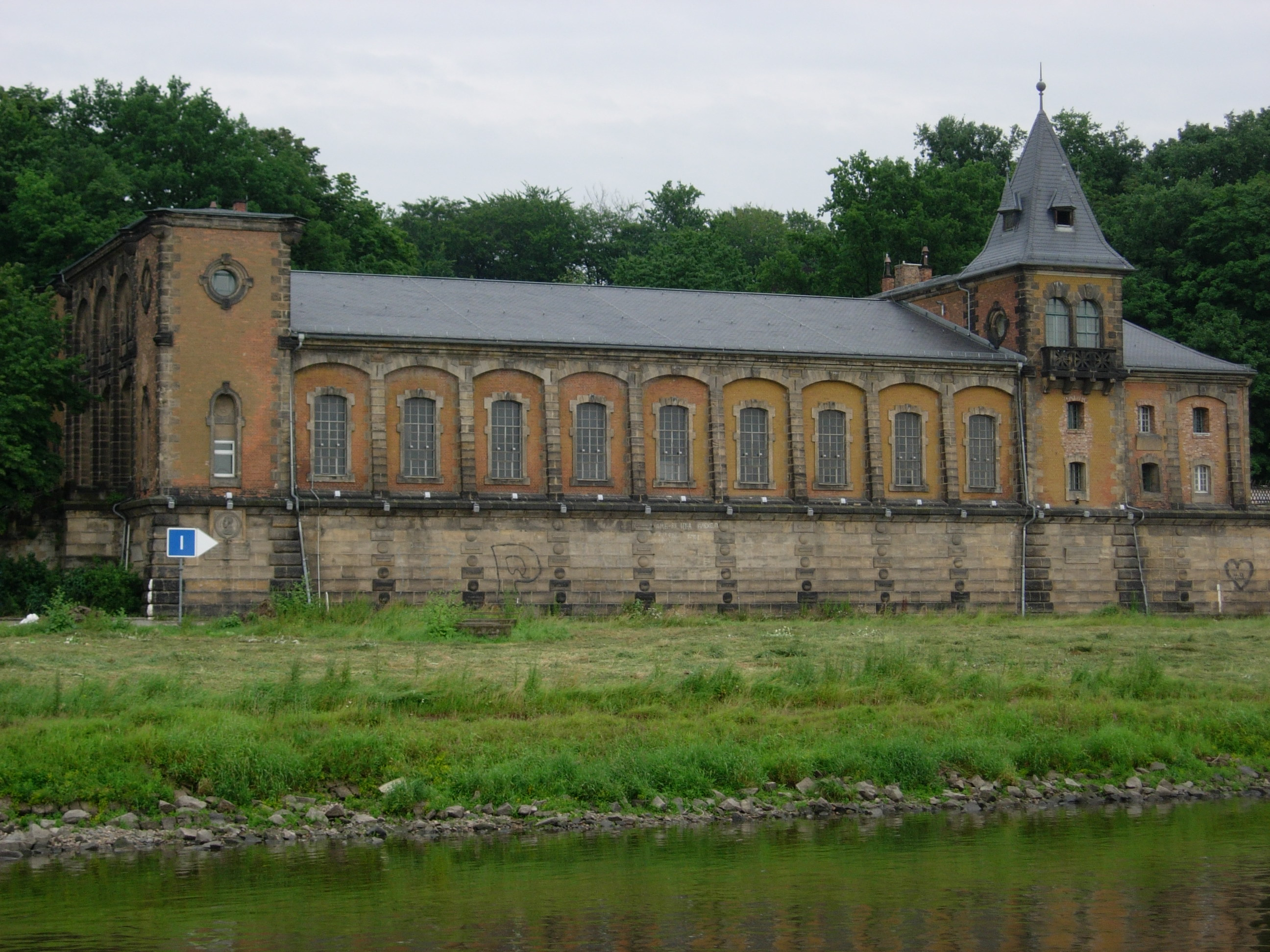
The Saloppe waterworks on the Elbe river bank extracts water running down from the Dresden Heath

The Fernsehturm Dresden-Wachwitz is the city TV tower. It is 252 metres high and towers 373 metres above the valley.

There are several waterworks in the city. Most of them use water from the Elbe river. One of the oldest waterworks is the "Saloppe", which extracts fresh water from small rivers in the Dresden Heath forest.

=== Bridges ===
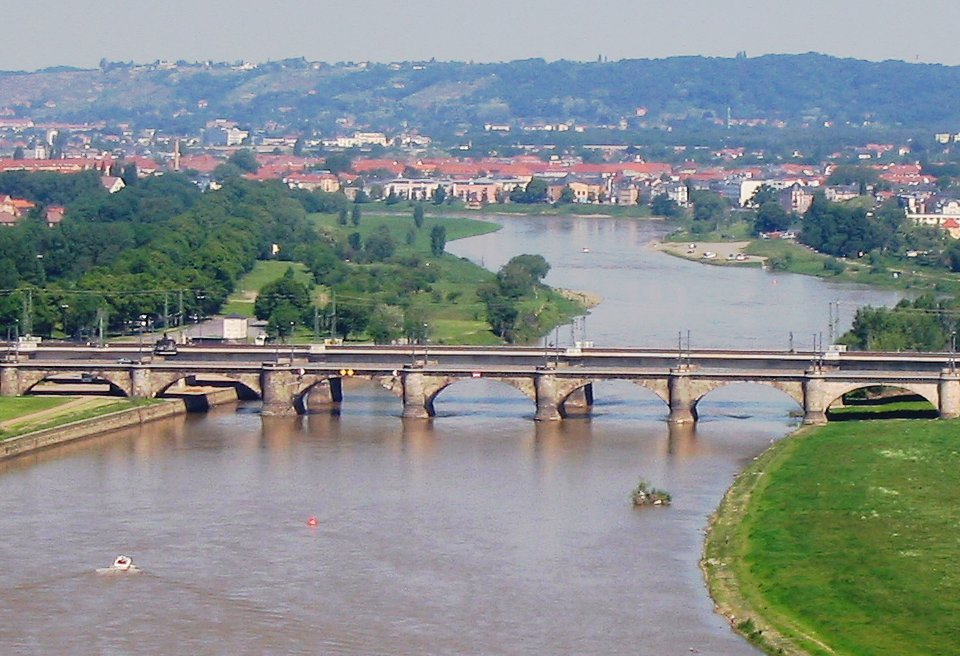
Marienbrücke

The place of the Augustusbrücke between Altstadt and Neustadt in the centre of the city is the location of the oldest bridges in Dresden. A bridge at that place is already reported in the 13th century. Also reported are the demolitions of that bridge in floods of the past as appeared the last time yet in the March floods of 1845.

The first bridge passed by the river is the Loschwitzer Brücke (famously known as Blaues Wunder). The Albertbrücke at the border of the inner city is some kilometre downstream. The following bridges Carolabrücke, Augustusbrücke and Marienbrücke are in short distances.

The Marienbrücke is divided into a road/tram bridges and a railway bridge. It connects the two train station of most importance in Dresden Hauptbahnhof and Dresden-Neustadt station on the historic Leipzig-Dresdner railway and is as like the Carolabridge which hosts four lines of an important road and an extra double-track of the tram.

=== Sculptures, monuments and fountains ===
There are more than 300 fountains in Dresden. Most of the wells serve only a decorative function, since there is a drinking water network in Dresden.

The artesian aquifer at Albertplatz is the only spring in Dresden that is run all-the-year due to its warm water. It was planned to produce fresh water for the Neustadt districts. About 3,900 litres per hour are flowing upwards the 240 metre depth well naturally by pressure.

Many springs in Dresden are historic monuments, such as the "Nymphenbad" in the Zwinger or the "Cholerabrunnen". The "Cholerabrunnen" was financed by Eugen von Gutschmid in thanks that Dresden was untroubled by the cholera epidemics in the 1940s years.

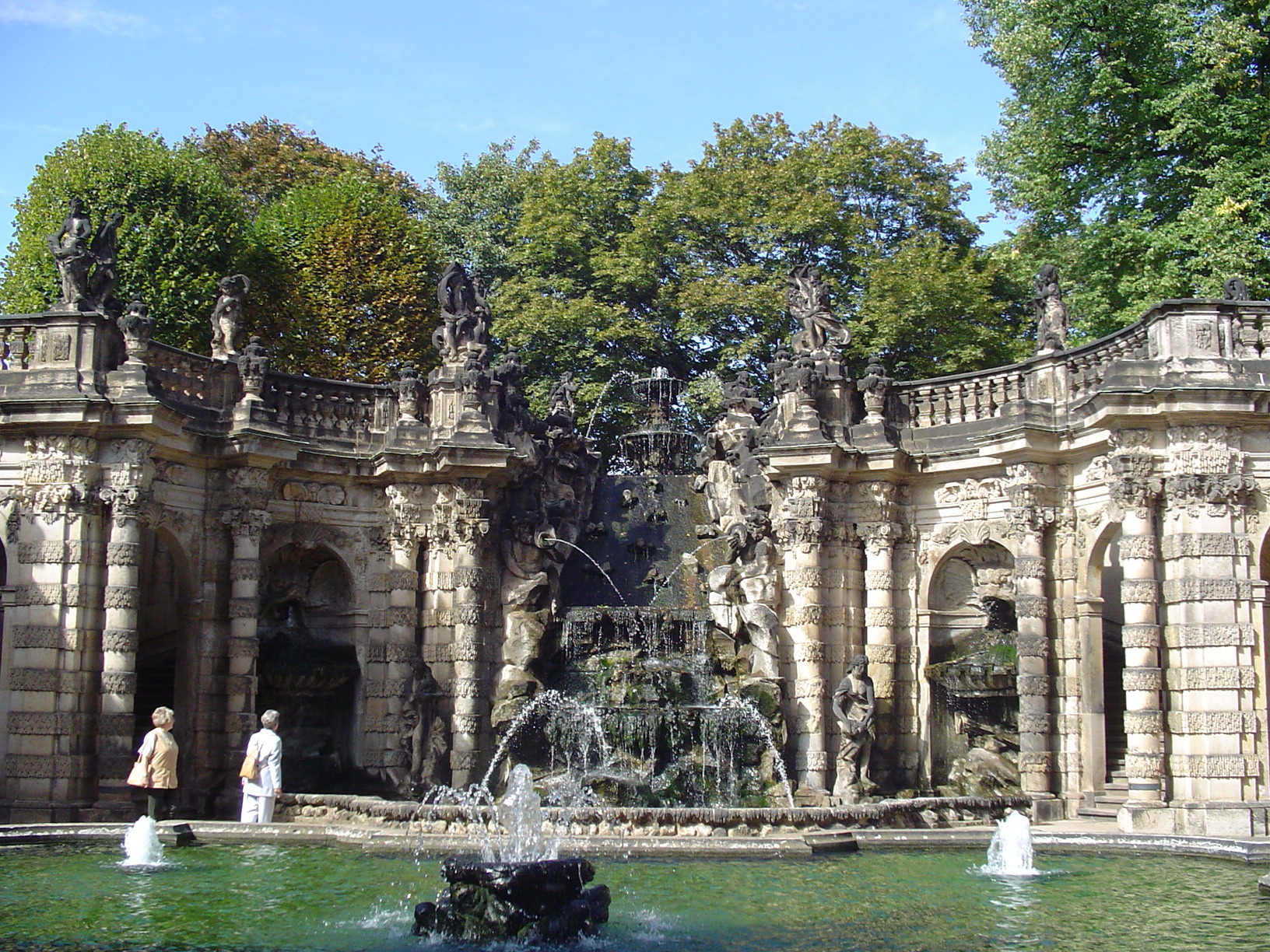
The Nymphenbad in the Zwinger

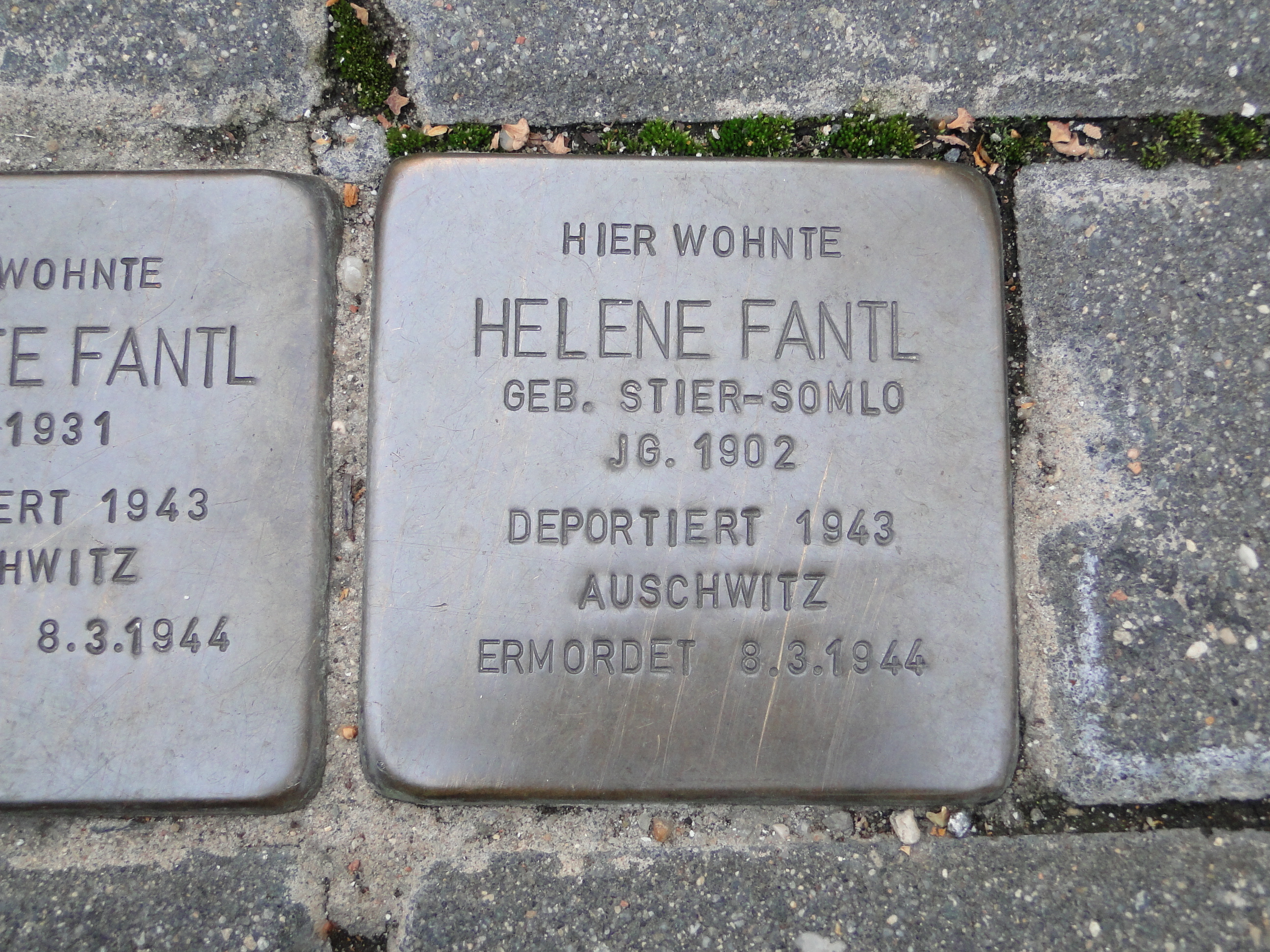
Stolpersteine in Dresden

Springs and fountains are also elements in contemporary cityspaces: Modern springs are arranged along the Prager Straße. Due to their styles of fountain, they are called "blowballs". The springs alongside the Hauptbahnhof train station are above the glass ceiling of an underground parking.

A prominent sculpture in Dresden is the golden equestrian sculpture of Augustus II the Strong called the "Goldener Reiter (Golden Cavalier)" on the Neustädter Markt square. It shows August at the beginning of the Hauptstraße (Main street) on his way to Warsaw where he was elected King of Poland. Another sculpture is the memorial of Martin Luther in front of the Frauenkirche.

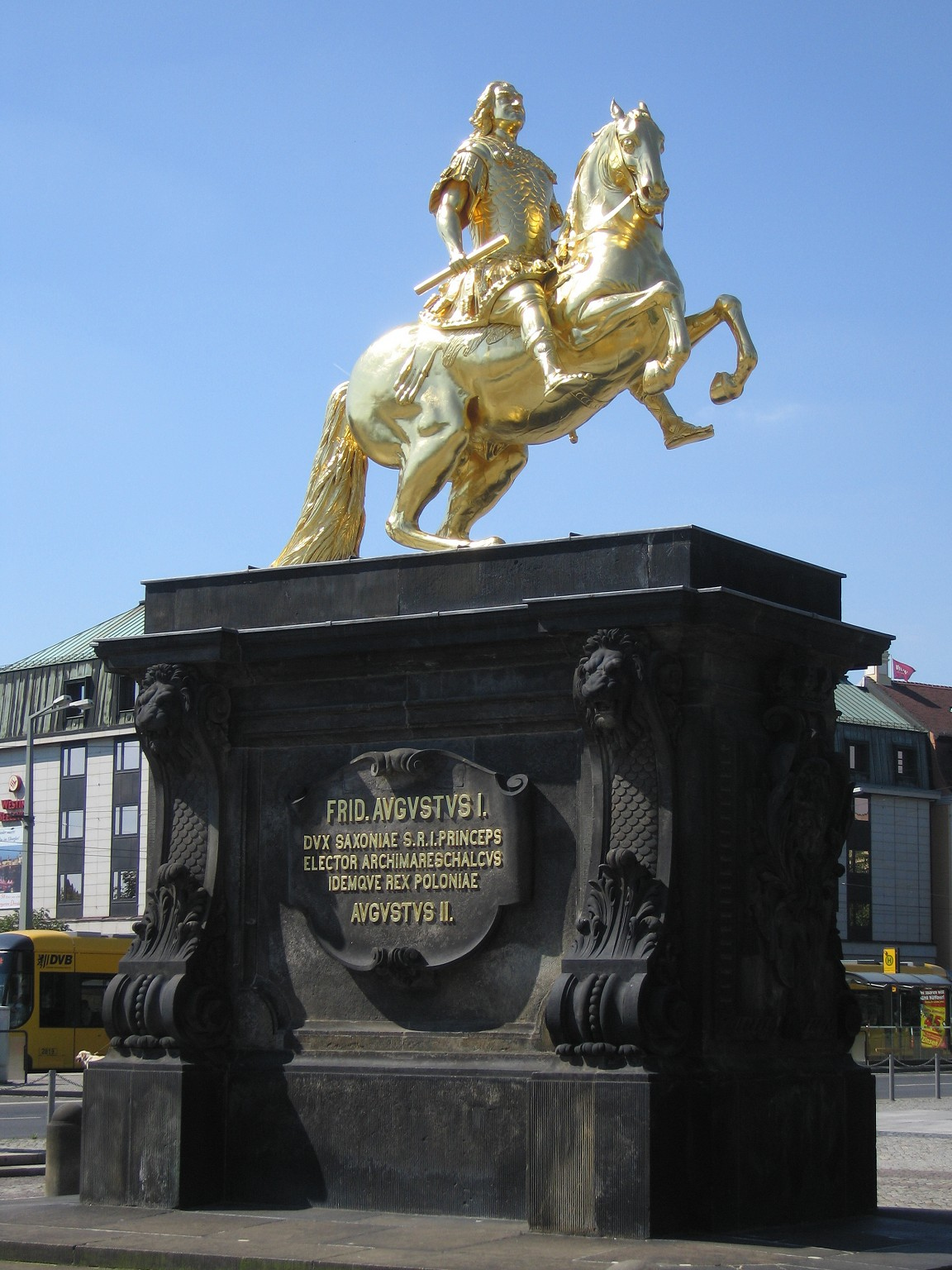
The Goldener Reiter, an equestrian sculpture of Augustus II the Strong

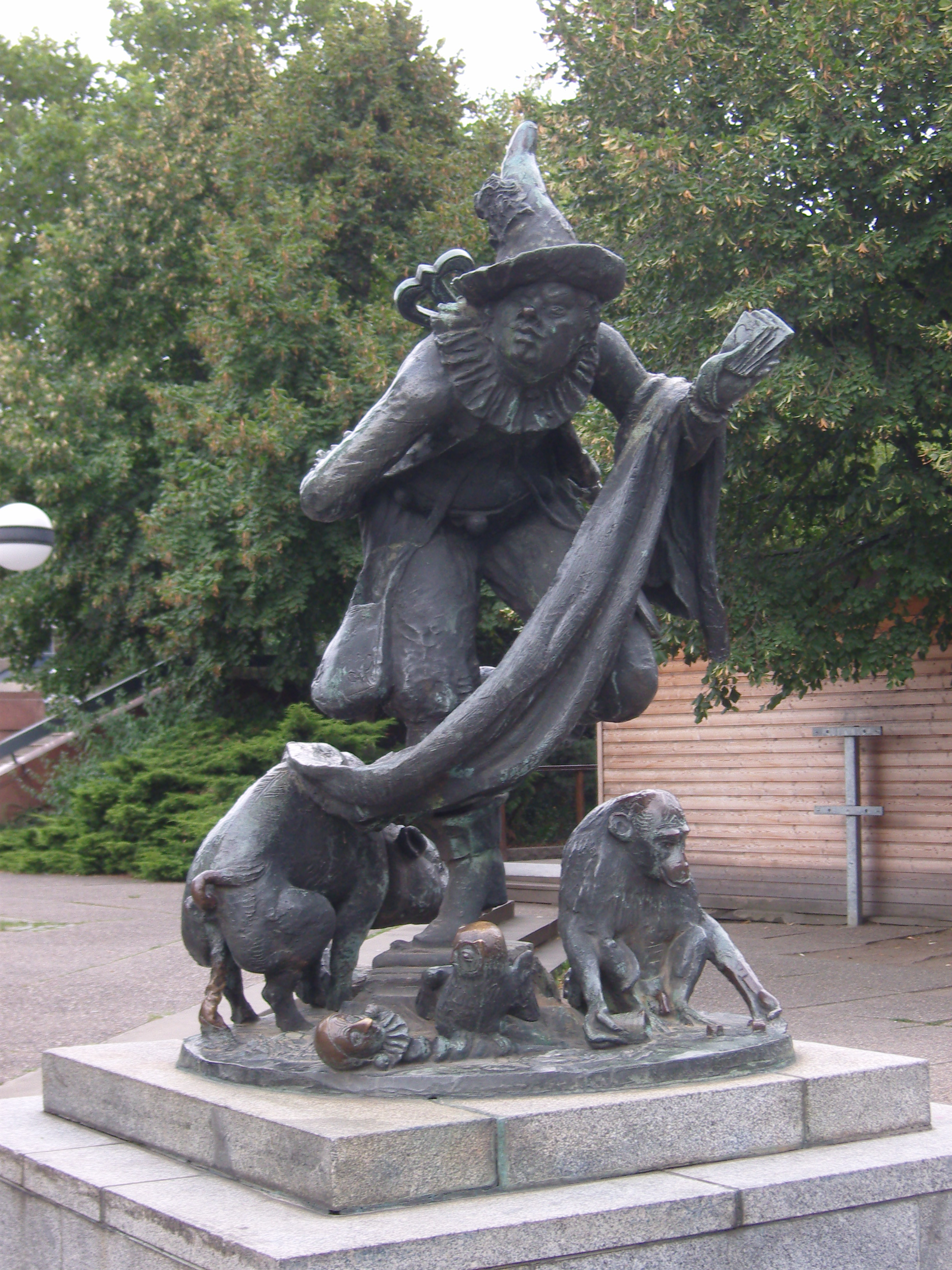
Joseph Fröhlich the Jester Augustus the Strong by Heinrich Apel

=== Others ===
- Kunsthofpassage in the Outer Neustadt
- Dresden Fair Ground in the New Slaughterhouses in the Ostragehege
- Rudolf-Harbig-Stadion and Heinz-Steyer-Stadion
- The Old Slaughterhouses
- Pfunds Molkerei
- Panometer (panorama + gasometer) in Reick

== Dresden-Hellerau – Germany's first garden city ==
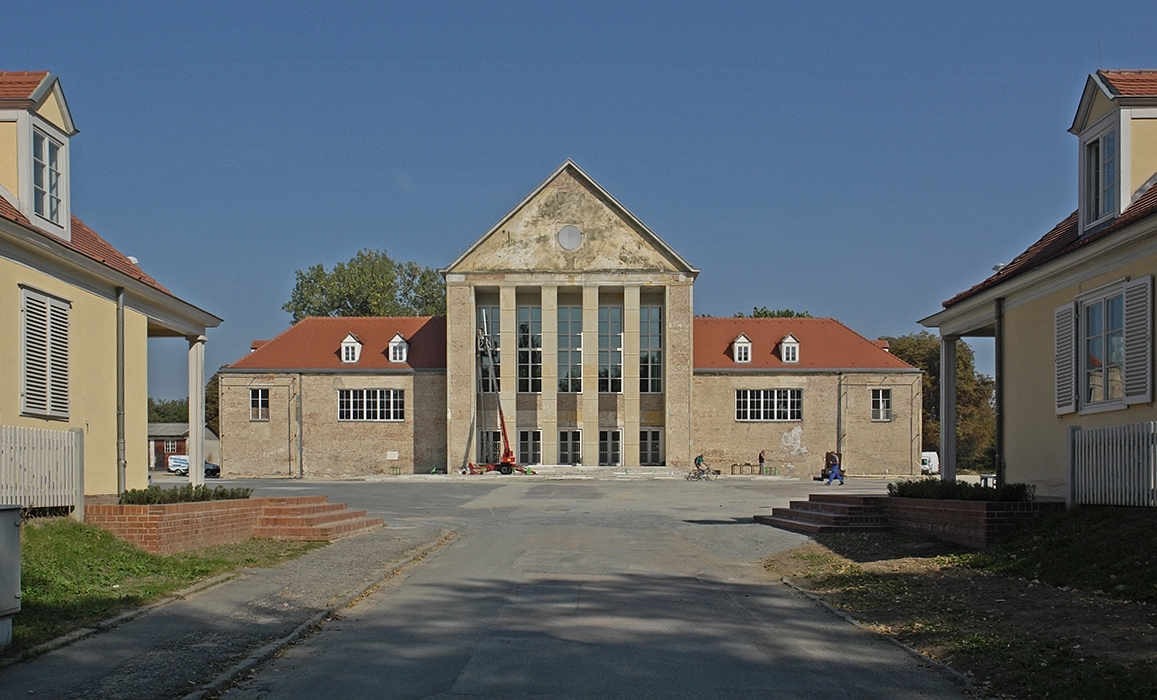
The Festspielhaus Hellerau

The garden city of Hellerau, at that time a suburb of Dresden, was founded in 1909 according to the principles postulated by the British reformer Ebenezer Howard. It was built by renowned architects and artists, amongst them Hermann Muthesius, Heinrich Tessenow, Theodor Fischer and Wilhelm Kreis. In 1911 Tessenow built the Hellerau Festspielhaus (festival theatre) for the Swiss music educator Émile Jaques-Dalcroze and Hellerau became a centre of modernism with international standing until the outbreak of World War I. During the Third Reich, this area was infamous.

In 1950 Hellerau was incorporated into the city of Dresden. Today the Hellerau reform architecture is recognised as exemplary. In the 1990s the garden city of Hellerau became a conservation area.

== Cinemas and cinematics ==
There still a lot of small cinemas and theatres of cinematic arts offering a programme of cult films and current films of low budget or weak promotion that were selected by their cultural worth. Dresden also has a couple of Multiplex Cinemas of which the Rundkino is the oldest. The cinema built in a circular building was out of order after the flooding of 2002 but was reopened in 2008.

Dresden has been a centre in the production of animated films and of the optical cinematic techniques. The Dresden Filmfest hosts a contest of short subjects which is among the most endowed contests in Europe.

== Literature ==
Dresden is a topic in German-language literature in various eras. Dresden was home to a number of authors or a place of their activities and influence.

Friedrich Schiller published his Ode to Joy in Dresden which he began in Gohlis near Leipzig in 1785.

E. T. A. Hoffmann's novella The Golden Pot. A Modern Fairytale is set in Dresden and was published in 1814. The Golden Pot has parts of realistic descriptions of Dresden and fades into a surreal world of myths. Hoffmann witnessed the Battle of Dresden in 1813.

Erich Kästner grow up in Dresden. He worked off his youth in Dresden (The Flying Classroom) and his military training in an artillery battalion in the Dresden Albertstadt garrison (poem Sergeant Waurich).

Kurt Vonnegut's novel Slaughterhouse-Five describes the bombing of Dresden in February 1945 seen from a slaughterhouse near the old city of Dresden. Vonnegut was prisoner of war in Dresden during that event.

Contemporary novelists who are active in Dresden include Uwe Tellkamp and Ingo Schulze. Both broach up the theme of "Mythos Dresden". Tellkamp is known for his novel Der Turm (The Tower) plotting the life of an academic family in its educated social environment (ivory tower society) of Dresden in the last seven years of former East Germany.

== Lifestyle ==
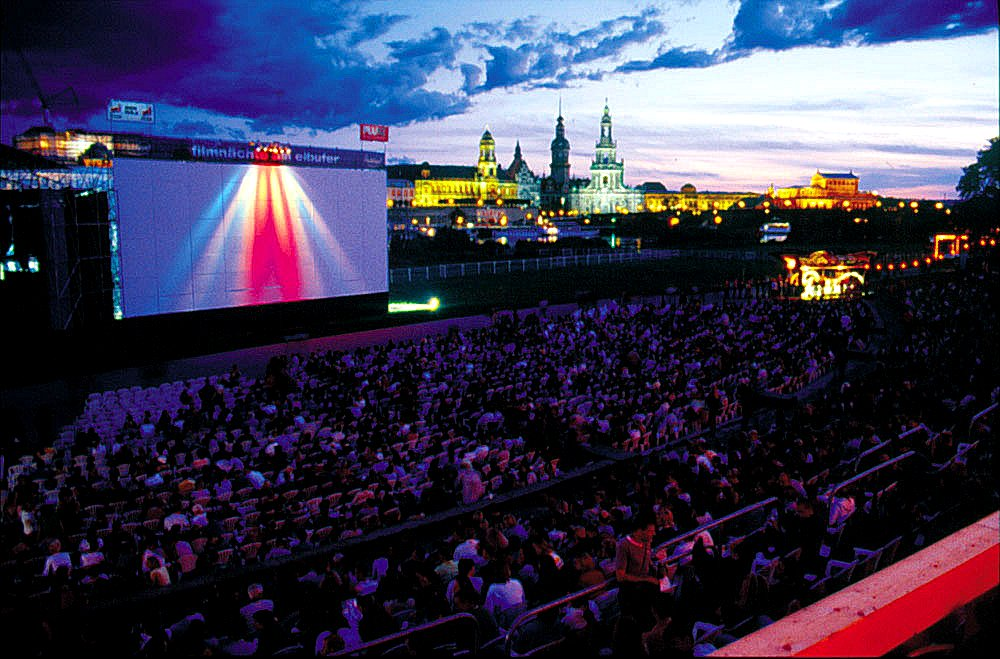
Filmnächte am Elbufer − Film night at the Elbe river banks

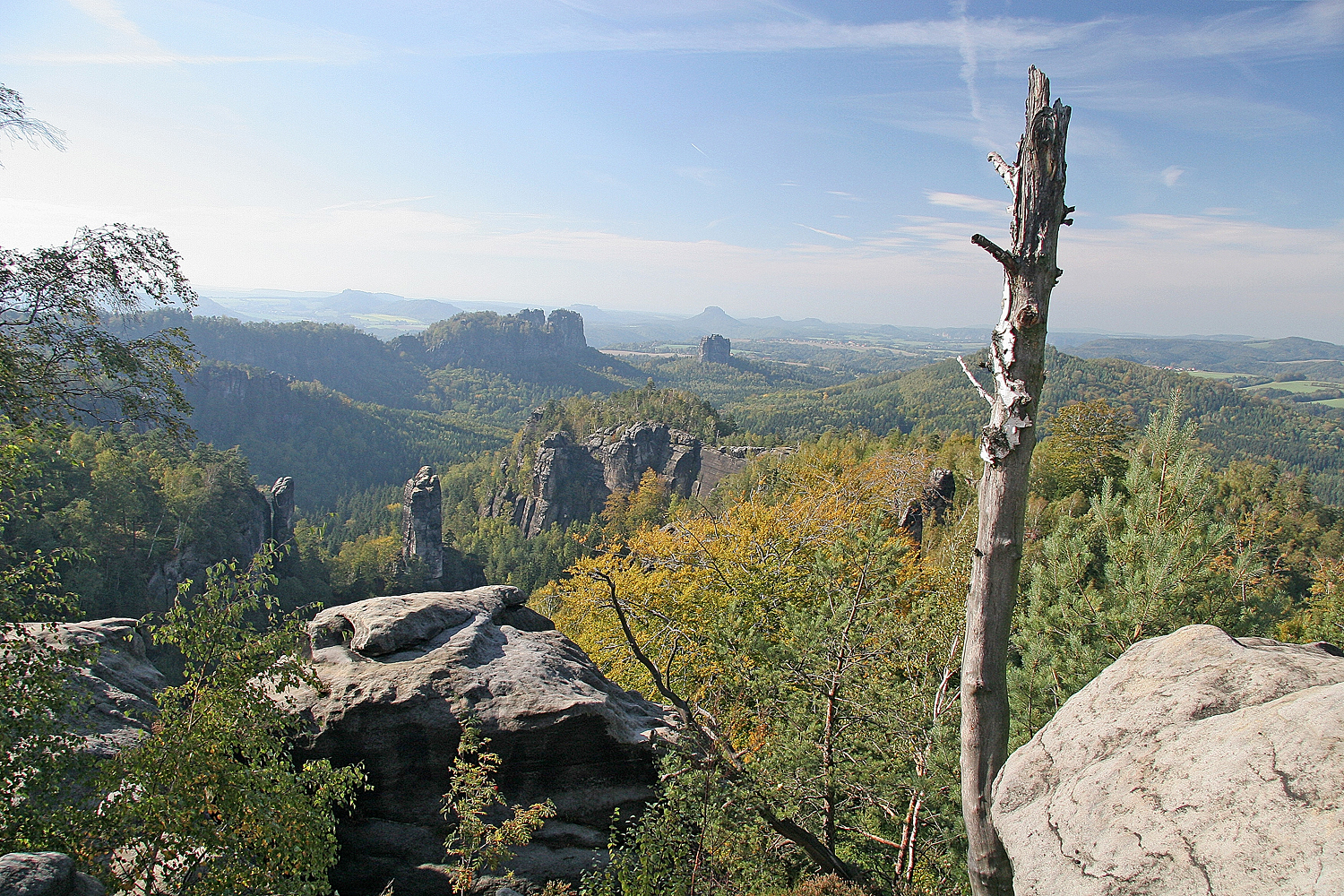
The Saxon Switzerland is not far away from Dresden; its rock formations can be seen from some places in Dresden.

Dresden's heterogeneous cityspace strongly influences the lifestyle of the city. Dresden can change from very urban to very rural in just a short distance. Dresden is renowned for its many events and concerts.

The inner city is functionally split into a number of districts. The historic city centre serves as the most important tourist area and offers a variety of restaurants, bars, and pubs that are visited by tourists as well as the local inhabitants. The Seevorstadt, south of the historic town centre, is the most important shopping area in Dresden. It is crossed by the famous Prager Straße shopping street with large department stores and smaller shops. The intersection with the Altmarkt, which is the oldest market place in Dresden, extend this shopping area into the town centre. The Seevorstadt, with the main station and an important tram hub within a short distance, is also a very urban area of Dresden. The Neustadt is divided into the touristy Inner Neustadt and the Outer Neustadt. The Inner Neustadt offers a cornucopia of restaurants and retail shopping as well as important cultural institutions. The Outer Neustadt features importantly in Dresden night life. The Outer Neustadt is the centre of subcultural and youth culture in Dresden with many clubs, bars, small stages, and alternative culture institutions.

Dresden is awash with green during the spring and summer. The huge parks and the long Elbe meadows are used day and at night for sports, parties and cultural activities. Local recreation takes place in the nearby National Park of Saxon Switzerland, in the Ore Mountains and in the countryside around Moritzburg, which are all close by. The cultural landscape of the Dresden Elbe Valley is a World Heritage Site but also part of the everyday life of many inhabitants. The site crosses the city and is passed through by commuter traffic, used in leisure time and lived in by tens of thousands of residents.

Dresden is a student city with its own infrastructure of event locations and cultural institutions. There are 16 student clubs in the Altstadt and Südvorstadt near the university.

Due to the Elbe river, rowing and canoeing are popular leisure activities in Dresden. Dresden is a chess centre and was the host city of the Chess Olympiad in 2008. Night inline skating events are held every week in the summer.

The style of housing can vary strongly within Dresden. In some cases old village cores are only a few minutes away from urban districts. The city centre is enormously different compared with the southern outskirts of the city. The Outer Neustadt, with the highest density of inhabitants, is just a kilometre away from the Dresdner Heide forest in the north. The large area in the south eastern corner and its outskirts are the most densely populated areas. Districts like Blasewitz or Striesen are covered with dotted housings and small garden areas around the houses. The Elbe slopes are covered with expensive villas. These contrast sharply with some areas such as the high-rise concrete blocks such as those in Gorbitz where living standards are low.

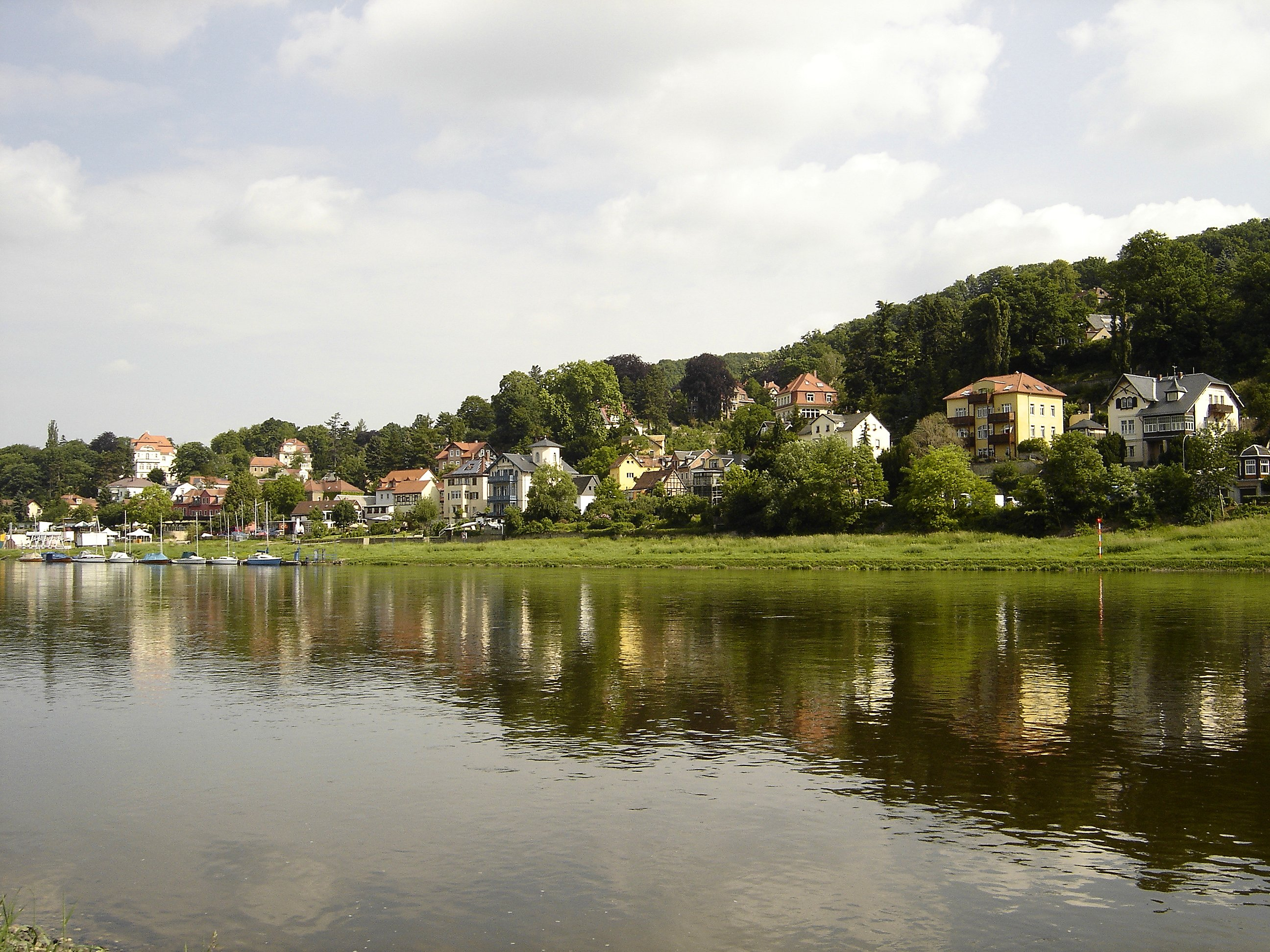
Rural setting of Wachwitz along the Elbe river

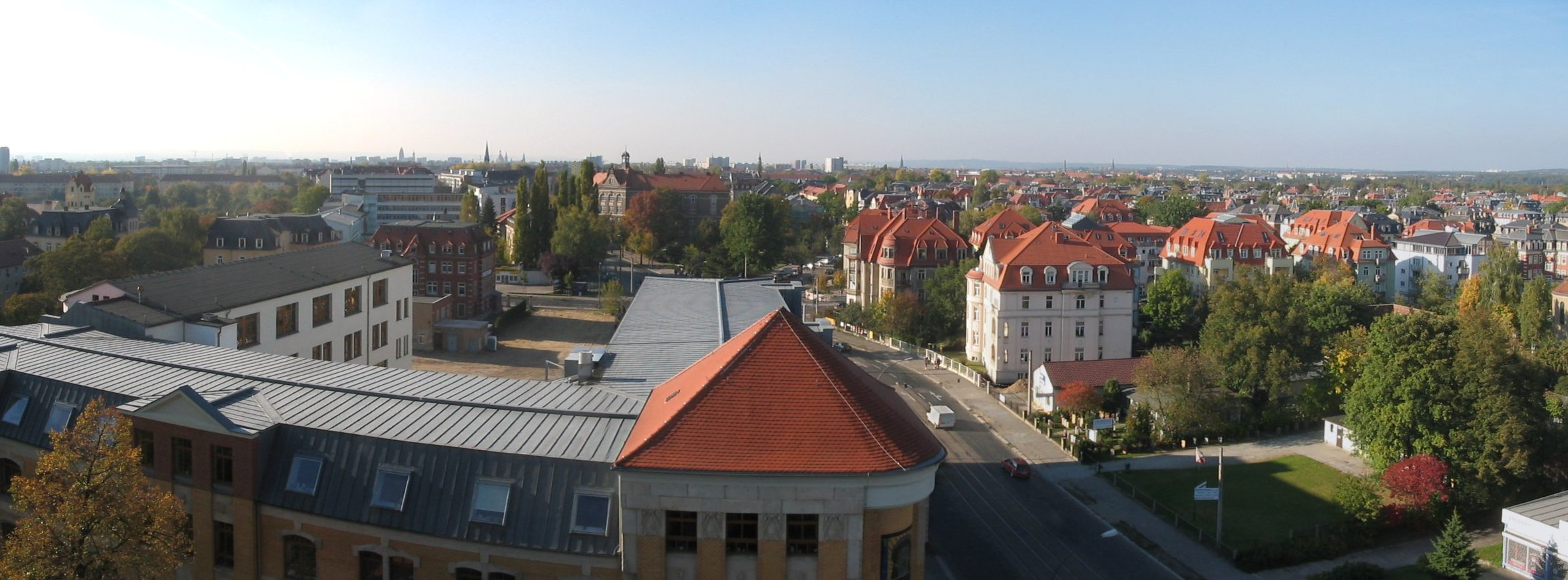
Dotted housings in Striesen

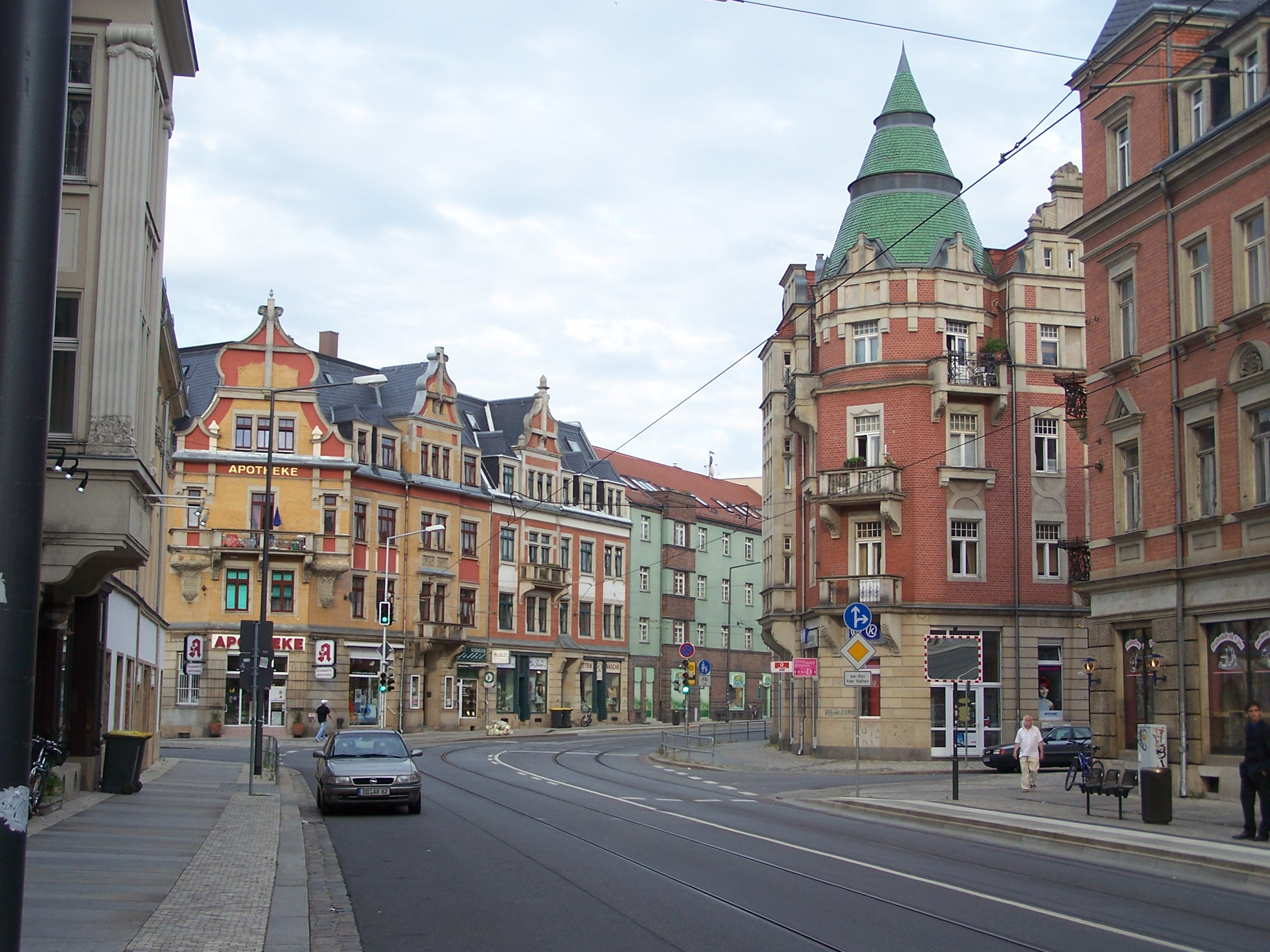
Wilhelminian styled enclosed housing in Trachau

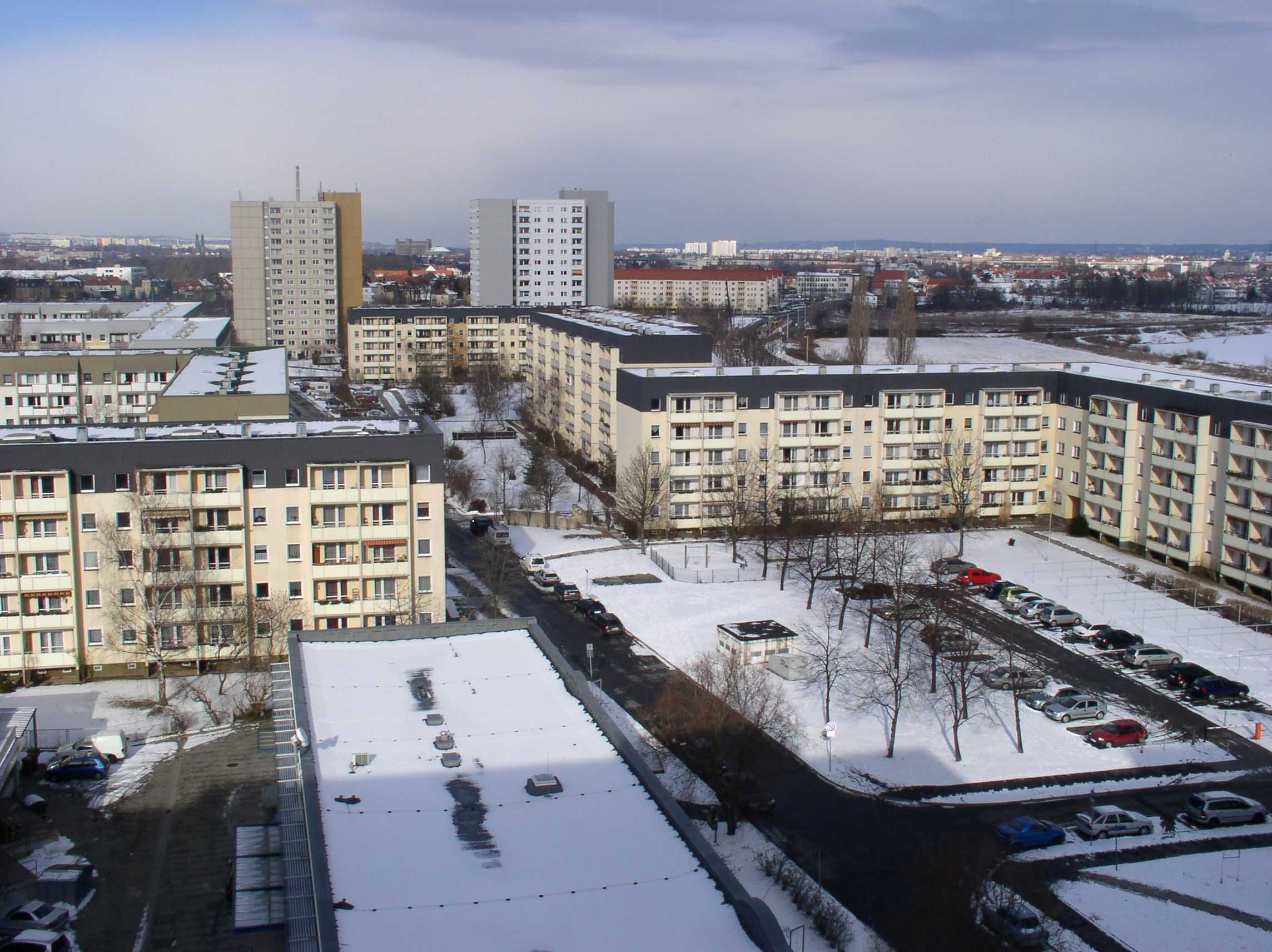
Concrete blocks in Leuben
