= Auf Ewig =

Studio album by Joachim Witt
- Released: 31 August 2007 (Germany)
- Genre: Neue Deutsche Härte
- Language: German
- Label: Edel Music

Joachim Witt chronology
Bayreuth 3 (2006)	Auf Ewig (2007)	DOM (2012)

Auf Ewig is a 2007 "best of" album by Joachim Witt. Also inside, is a bonus DVD containing music videos and interviews. Two new songs were made for this album, "Unsere Welt" and "Weh-Oh-Weh". The remainder of the album was remastered with some remixes.

The album peaked at position 36 in the German Media Control Charts.

== Track listing ==
1. Goldener Reiter (Neuzeit Mix)
2. Ich Spreng den Tag!
3. Eisenherz
4. Jetzt und Ehedem
5. Hundert Leiber
6. Die Flut
7. Herbergsvater (Tri-Tra-Trul-La-La) (Danzmusik Mix)
8. Und Ich Lauf
9. Wem Gehort das Sternenlicht?
10. Das Geht Tief
11. Unsere Welt "Our World"
12. Supergestort und Superversaut (Oomph!-Remix)
13. Bataillon D'Amour
14. Weh-Oh-Weh "Woe-Oh-Woe"
15. Wo Versteckt Sich Gott?
16. Immer Noch

== Bonus DVD ==
The bonus DVD contains music videos from the Bayreuth 1-3, Eisenherz and POP albums. The interviews are in German and no other subtitles are available.

1. Die Flut (feat. Peter Heppner)
2. Bataillon D' Amour
3. Und Ich Lauf
4. Das Geht Tief
5. Goldener Reiter (Neuzeit Mix)
6. Wem Gehort Das Sternrnlicht?
7. Wo Versteckt Sich Gott?
8. Stay?
9. Herbergsvater (Ti-Tra-Trul-La-La) (Danzmusik Mix)
10. Fur Den Moment
11. Eisenherz
12. Interviews
