= Mit Rucksack und Harpune =

Studio album by Joachim Witt
- Released: February 1985
- Recorded: August–October 1984
- Studio: Can Studio, Weilerswist, Cologne
- Genre: Neue Deutsche Welle
- Length: 39:59
- Language: German
- Label: Wea (Warner)
- Producer: Joachim Witt, Klaus Voormann, René Tinner

Joachim Witt chronology
Märchenblau (1983)	Mit Rucksack und Harpune (1985)	Moonlight Nights (1985)

Mit Rucksack und Harpune is the fourth studio album released by Joachim Witt in 1985.

== Track listing ==
All music and lyrics by Joachim Witt; except where noted.

1. "Blonde Kuh" "Blonde Cow" (music: Harald Gutowski) - 3:22
2. "Strom" "River" - 3:28
3. "When I Fall in Love (Mit Dir)" "When I fall in love (with you)" (music: Peter Sawatzki) - 3:48
4. "Zick-Zack-Zucker-Rock" - 3:32
5. "No- No- No- No" - 5:42
6. "Mi Amor" - 5:46
7. "Das Supergesicht" "The Superface" - 4:55
8. "Rucksack- Idiot" "Backpack- Idiot" - 4:15
9. "Sahib (Combat-DaDa-Video)" (music: Hans Bäär, Rüdiger Braune, Rüdiger Elze) - 3:52

== Personnel ==
- Joachim Witt - vocals
- Rüdiger Elze - guitar
- Hans Bäär - bass
- Klaus Voormann - keyboards
- Rudiger Braune - drums
