= Live in der Berliner Philharmonie =

Live album by Joachim Witt
- Released: 4 November 2002
- Genre: Industrial, NDH
- Length: 181 Minutes
- Label: Sony Music Entertainment

Witt – Live in der Berliner Philharmonie is a live album by German rock musician Joachim Witt that was recorded in 2002.

== Track listing video ==
1. Bataillon d'Amour
2. Jetzt und ehedem
3. Das geht tief
4. Kyrie eleison! (Der Mönch)
5. In tiefer Nacht
6. Der Sturm
7. Seenot
8. Und... ich lauf
9. Über den Ozean
10. Wintermärz
11. Hey – Hey (Was für ein Morgen!)
12. Dann warst du da!
13. Liebe und Zorn
14. Die Flucht
15. Die Flut
16. Stay?
17. Goldener Reiter
18. Medley -Kosmetik (Ich bin das Glück dieser Erde)
19. Tri Tra Trullala (Herbergsvater)

== Bonus videos ==
1. Die Flut
2. Bataillon d'Amour
3. Und... ich lauf
4. Das geht tief
5. Stay?
