= Bayreuth 2 =

Studio album by Joachim Witt
- Released: 28 November 2000
- Genre: Neue Deutsche Härte
- Length: 48:46
- Language: German
- Label: Epic (Sony Music Entertainment GmbH)

Joachim Witt chronology
Bayreuth 1 (1998)	Bayreuth 2 (2000)	Eisenherz (2002)

Bayreuth 2 is the ninth studio album released by Joachim Witt in November 2000.

== Track listing ==
1. Bataillon d'Amour "Bataillon of Love" - 3:50 (Silly cover)
2. Stay? - 4:41
3. Der Sturm "The Storm" - 4:17
4. In tiefer Nacht "In a deep Night" - 5:16
5. Jetzt und ehedem "Now and Formerly" - 4:19
6. Seenot "Distress" - 4:26
7. Kyrie eleison! (Der Mönch) "Kyrie eleison! (The Monk) - 4:37
8. Dann warst du da! "Then you were there!" - 4:19
9. Hey - Hey (Was für ein Morgen!) "Hey - Hey (What a Morning!) - 4:14
10. Die Flucht "The Escape" - 3:56
11. Über den Ozean "Over the Ocean" - 4:36
