= Live at Secret Garden =

Live album by Joachim Witt
- Released: 2005
- Genre: Industrial, NDH
- Producer: Recorded/Editing/Pre-mastering by thomas bölker (www.concert-recording.de

Live at Secret Garden is a live album by Joachim Witt, recorded at a performance in 2005.

== Track listing ==
No.	Title	Length
1.	"Liebe Und Zorn"	5:37
2.	"Krieger Des Lichts"	4:17
3.	"Das Geht Tief"	6:07
4.	"Bataillon D'Amour"	4:38
5.	"Treibjagd"	4:52
6.	"Fluch Der Liebe"	5:12
7.	"...Und Ich Lauf"	5:16
8.	"Jetzt Und Ehedem"	5:10
9.	"Supergestört Und Superversaut"	4:35
10.	"Die Flut"	6:23
11.	"Eisenherz"	5:48
12.	"Goldener Reiter"	7:07
13.	"Herbergsvater"	9:01
