= Pop (Joachim Witt album) =

POP

Studio album by Joachim Witt
- Released: 24 January 2004
- Genre: Neue Deutsche Härte
- Length: 61:52
- Language: German
- Label: SPV GmbH (Germany), Dancing Ferret Discs (US)

Joachim Witt chronology
Eisenherz (2002)	POP (2004)	Bayreuth 3 (2006)

POP is the eleventh studio album released by Joachim Witt in 2004.

== Track listing ==
1. Krieger des Lichts "Warrior of light" - 3:26
2. Fluch der Liebe "Curse of love" - 3:29
3. Für den Moment "For the moment" - 3:51
4. Ich will mehr "I want more" - 4:00
5. Du wirst bald Geschichte sein "You will soon be history" - 3:45
6. Mein Freund der Baum "My friend the tree" - 3:32
7. Später "Later" - 4:08
8. Vorwärts "Forward" - 4:09
9. Sag was du willst "Say what you want" - 3:45
10. Erst wenn das Herz nicht mehr aus Stein ist "Only when the heart is no longer made of stone" - 4:04
11. Draußen vor der Tür "Outside the door" - 4:02
12. Immer noch "Still" - 4:25
13. You Make Me Wonder - 6:34
14. Zeit zu gehen *US Edition Bonus Track* "Time to go" - 3:28
15. Erst wenn das Herz nicht mehr aus Stein ist (Club Remix) *US Edition Bonus Track - 5:04

== Chart performance ==
Chart (2004)	Peak position
German Albums (Offizielle Top 100)	39
