= Bayreuth 1 =

Studio album by Joachim Witt
- Released: 4 May 1998
- Genre: Neue Deutsche Härte
- Length: 51:53
- Language: German
- Label: Strange Ways

Joachim Witt chronology
Kapitän der Träume (1992)	Bayreuth 1 (1998)	Bayreuth 2 (2000)

Bayreuth 1 is the eighth studio album by Joachim Witt, released 4 May 1998. It marks the beginning of the Bayreuth trilogy and the beginning of Witt's industrial side.

== Track listing ==
1. Das jüngste Gericht "(Judgment Day)" – 4:05
2. Das geht tief "(This Goes Deep)" – 5:28
3. Träume, die kein Wind verweht "(Dreams that are not blown over)" – 4:22
4. Die Flut (feat. Peter Heppner) "(The Flood)" – 5:41
5. Wintermärz "(Winter March)" – 5:28
6. Treibjagd "(Hunt)" – 4:29
7. Trauma – 4:00
8. Morgenstern "(Morningstar)" – 4:07
9. Und... ich lauf "(And ... I run)" – 4:39
10. Liebe und Zorn "(Love and Anger)" – 5:18
11. Venusmond "(Venus Moon)" – 4:16
12. Und... ich lauf (Laibach Remix) – 4:27 (Only Released on the Special Edition)
