= Joachim Witt =

German musician and actor (born 1949)

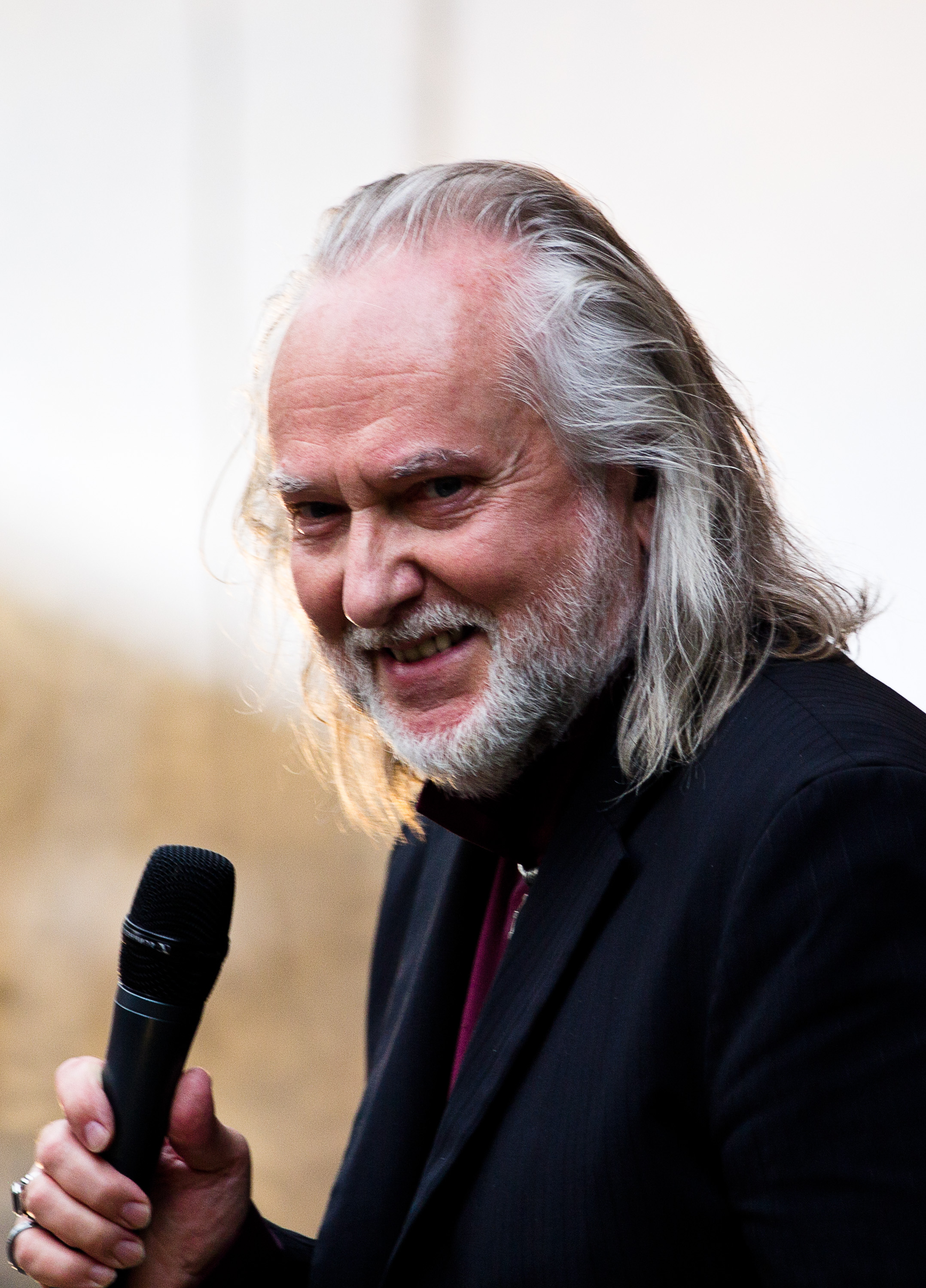
- Witt in 2014

Background information
- Born: 22 February 1949 (age 77); Hamburg, Allied-occupied Germany
- Genres: Neue Deutsche Welle; Neue Deutsche Härte; industrial rock; gothic rock; industrial metal; gothic metal
- Instruments: Vocals; guitar
- Years active: 1977–present
- Labels: WEA; Polydor; RCA; Metronome; Strangeways; Epic; SPV; Megaphon (all German); Dancing Ferret Discs (US)
- Formerly of: Duesenberg
- Website: joachimwitt.de

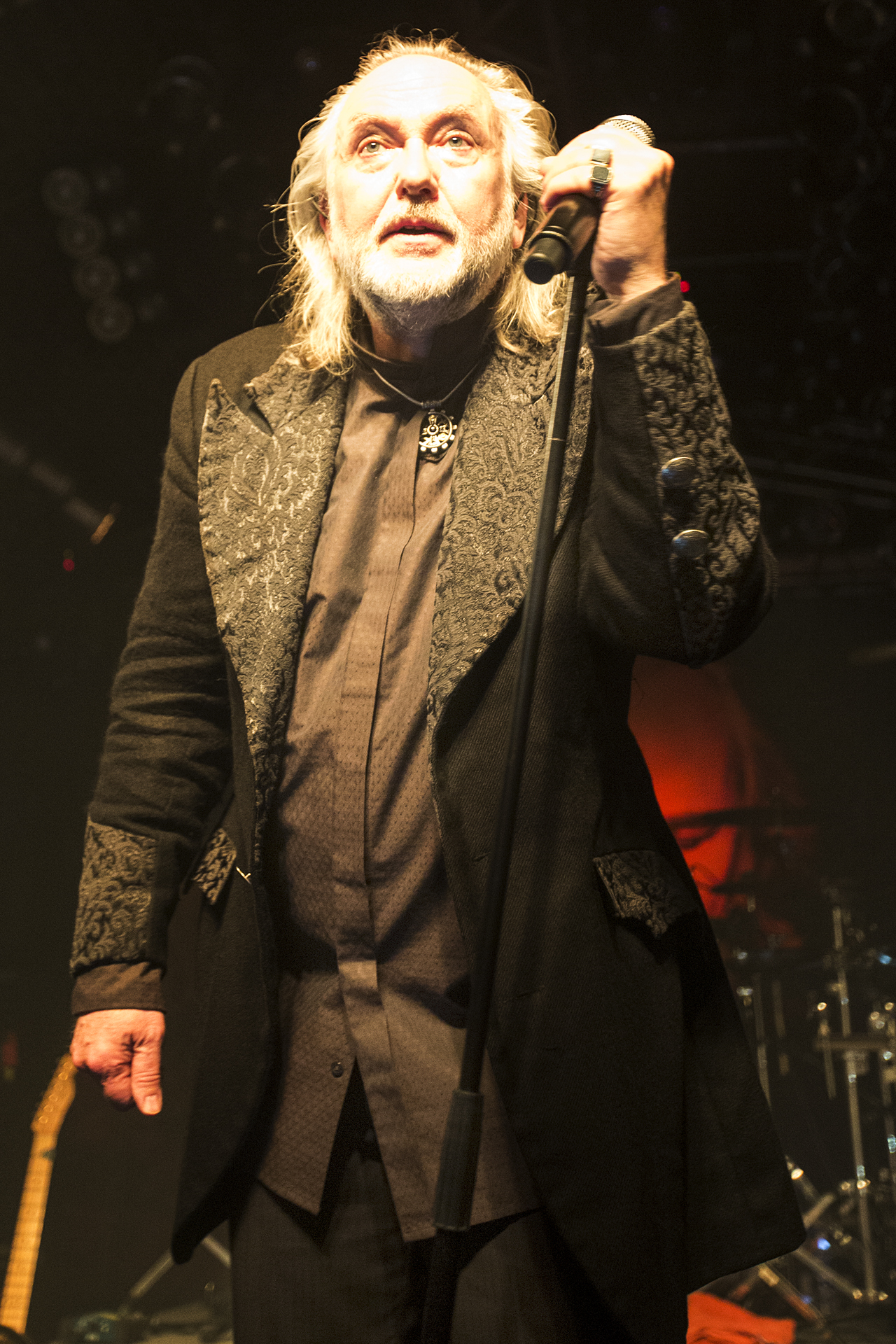
Witt during a 2014 performance.

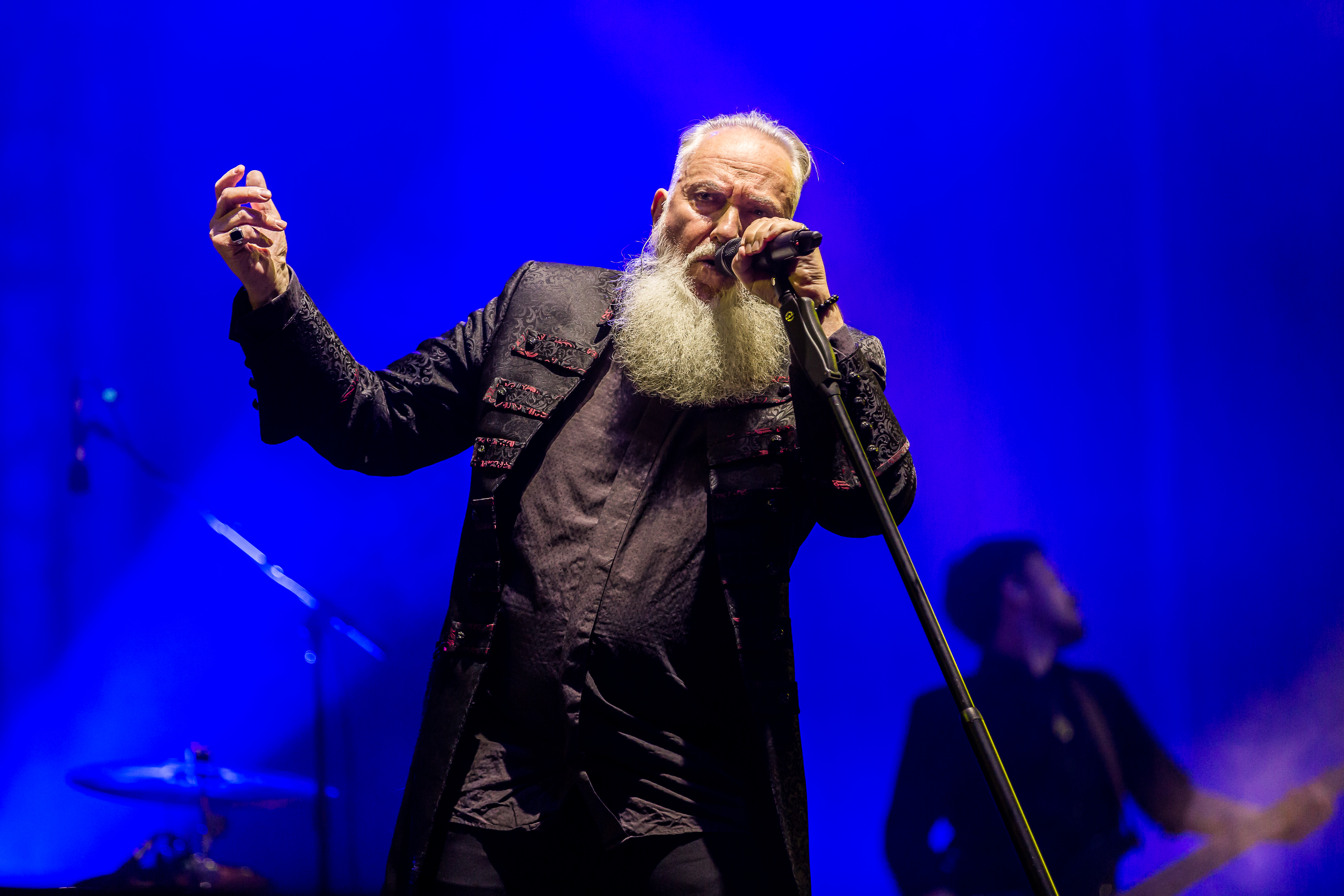
Witt at Rockharz Open Air 2019 in Germany

Joachim Richard Carl Witt (born 22 February 1949) is a German rock musician and actor who has been active since 1977. During his prolific 50-year career, Witt has released 20 studio albums and a further 8 compilation and live albums as a solo artist. Early in his career, a member of the krautrock band Duesenberg, Witt released an additional three studio albums.

== Biography ==
Witt was the guitarist/singer in the 1970s krautrock band Duesenberg. He released three albums with them, Duesenberg (1977), Duesenberg 2 (1978) and Strangers (1979), before embarking on a solo career as a singer and actor.

Witt became a major star of the German pop scene during the 1980s with huge hits such as "Goldener Reiter". He was one of the biggest names of the "Neue Deutsche Welle" (New German Wave), of which performers like Nena and Falco were also a part.

He made a big comeback at the end of the 1990s, when he scored a major hit with "Die Flut", a duet with Peter Heppner, the singer of popular German synthpop group Wolfsheim. Witt's album "Bayreuth 1" (1998) went platinum in Germany and Austria. "Bayreuth 2" followed two years later. He has collaborated with such artists as Apocalyptica, Oomph!, Angelzoom, Tilo Wolff of Lacrimosa and just recently, German electropop group Purwien as well.

In 2000, Journey of Life, released by X-Perience, featured a duet with Witt called "The Meaning of Life".

Witt also contributed the song "Vandemar" to the 2006 album Where's Neil When You Need Him?, a compilation of songs based on the works of author Neil Gaiman. "Vandemar" is based on a character from Gaiman's novel Neverwhere.

Witt was featured in Angelzoom's 2004 video "Back in the Moment" and in 2007 with Purwien's video "Alle Fehler" (All Errors).

Witt's "best-of" album titled Auf Ewig was released on 31 August 2007. It contains 16 tracks of some of his current and past work but with more of the hard-hitting Bayreuth 3 sound. Also inside is a bonus DVD containing music videos and interviews. To celebrate the release of Auf Ewig, Witt released two new videos of his biggest hits from the 1980s, "Goldener Reiter" and "Herbergsvater". Two million copies of the album have been sold.

=== 2009–present ===
Witt remixed songs from various bands, including Sara Noxx's single "Earth Song". His next contribution was a remix to a song from Obszon Geschopf's album Erection Body Mutilated (Back from the Dead) that was released in April 2009.

On 12 March 2009, Witt announced on his official MySpace that the Bayreuth Trilogy had ended and all that he provided was that "New projects will take place in the near future."

Witt also contributed to the Dorian Hunter play by creating the Dorian Hunter 2009 Theme which is available worldwide on iTunes.

In May 2009, Witt confirmed that he is working on his thirteenth album, which is titled Retromania and is currently unknown when the album will be released as it has been delayed.

The Joachim Witt forums and the official Facebook page has confirmed that the album Retromania had been cancelled, but Witt had stated himself that there already is an album in the works and is slated for release, sometime in Autumn of 2012.

On 28 September 2012, Witt released his anticipated album DOM; this was his first album in nearly seven years. The single, "Gloria", Witt refers to a third milestone of his work after The Golden Rider and The Flood.

On 25 April 2014, Witt released the album Neumond. It returns to the Pop sound.

Witt announced his 15th album on 13 December 2014. Titled Ich, it was funded by Pledgemusic and was released in April 2015.

== Discography ==
=== Studio albums ===
- Silberblick (1980)
- Edelweiß (1982)
- Märchenblau (1983)
- Mit Rucksack und Harpune (1985)
- Moonlight Nights (1985)
- 10 Millionen Partys (1988)
- Kapitän der Träume (1992)
- Bayreuth 1 (1998)
- Bayreuth 2 (2000)
- Eisenherz (2002)
- Pop (2004)
- Bayreuth 3 (2006)
- DOM (2012)
- Neumond (2014)
- Ich (2015)
- Thron (2016)
- Rübezahl (2018)
- Rübezahls Rückkehr (2020)
- Rübezahls Reise (2022)
- Der Fels in der Brandung (2023)

=== Live albums ===
- Live in der Berliner Philharmonie (2002)
- Live at Secret Garden (2005)
- Wir (2015)
- Refugium (2019)

=== Compilation albums ===
- Goldener Reiter (1996)
- Das Beste von Joachim Witt (1998)
- The Platinum Collection (2006)
- Auf Ewig (2007)

=== Singles ===
- 1981: Goldener Reiter
- 1981: Kosmetik
- 1982: Herbergsvater
- 1983: Märchenblau
- 1983: Hörner in der Nacht
- 1984: Wieder bin ich nicht geflogen
- 1984: Das Supergesicht
- 1985: Blonde Kuh
- 1986: How will I Know
- 1987: Mad News
- 1988: Engel sind zart
- 1988: Pet Shop Boy
- 1988: Der Tankwart heißt Lou
- 1989: Herbergsvater Mix ´90
- 1990: Goldener Reiter -Thorsten Fenslau Remix
- 1991: Hallo Deutschland
- 1992: Das kann doch einen Seemann nicht erschüttern
- 1992: Restlos
- 1992: In die falsche Welt geboren
- 1992: Kapitän der Träume
- 1994: Goldener Reiter Remix ´94
- 1995: Goldener Raver
- 1997: Das geht tief
- 1998: Die Flut
- 1998: Und ... ich lauf
- 1999: Das geht Tief
- 2000: Bataillon d´Amour
- 2002: Eisenherz
- 2002: Supergestört und Superversaut
- 2004: Erst wenn das Herz nicht mehr aus Stein ist
- 2005: Back in the Moment (with Angelzoom)
- 2006: Sternenlicht
- 2007: Alle Fehler (with Purwien)
- 2009: Dorian Hunter Theme
- 2009: Kosmetik
- 2009: Ja, ja...
- 2009: Goldener Reiter
- 2009: Mein Schatten
- 2012: Gloria
- 2013: Kein Weg zu Weit
- 2014: Mein Herz
- 2014: Die Erde brennt
- 2015: Hände Hoch
- 2015: Über das Meer
- 2016: Terrorist der Liebe (with Hubert Kah)
- 2018: Aufstehen
- 2020: Die Rückkehr
