= Märchenblau =

Studio album by Joachim Witt
- Released: 1983
- Recorded: February–September 1983
- Studio: Can Studio, Weilerswist, Cologne
- Genre: Neue Deutsche Welle
- Length: 34:16
- Language: German and English
- Label: Wea (Warner)
- Producer: Joachim Witt, René Tinner

Joachim Witt chronology
Edelweiß (1982)	Märchenblau (1983)	Mit Rucksack und Harpune (1985)

Märchenblau is the third studio album released by Joachim Witt in 1983. Two tracks, "Night and Day" and "I Know – We Know (She Knows Kino)" are entirely in English.

== Track listing ==
All tracks composed by Joachim Witt; except where noted.

1. "Märchenblau" "Fairy-tale Blue"
2. "Einmal werd´ich ganz berühmt" "One day I'll be Famous"
3. "Rhythmus im Blut" "Rhythm in Blood"
4. "Halt mich" "Hold me"
5. "Wie ein wilder Stier" "Like a savage Bull"
6. "Hörner in der Nacht" "Horns in the Night"
7. "Night and Day" (Cole Porter)
8. "I Know – We Know" (She Knows Kino)
9. "Wieder bin ich nicht geflogen" "Again I did not Fly"

== Personnel ==
- Joachim Witt - vocals, guitar, bass
- Ralf Engelbrecht - guitar
- Rosko Gee - bass
- Helmut Zerlett - keyboards
- Jaki Liebezeit - drums
- Matthias Keul - contrabass
- Gerd Dudek - saxophone
- Joachim Fink - trombone
