= Kapitän der Träume =

Studio album by Joachim Witt
- Released: December 1992
- Studio: Harry Nova, Hamburg; Can Studio, Weilerswist, Cologne; Boogie Park Studio, Hamburg
- Genre: Neue Deutsche Welle
- Language: German
- Label: Metronome
- Producer: Annette Humpe, Joachim Witt

Joachim Witt chronology
10 Millionen Partys (1988)	Kapitän der Träume (1992)	Bayreuth 1 (1998)

Kapitän der Träume is the seventh studio album released by Joachim Witt in 1992. This marks the last album from Joachim Witt that features Neue Deutsche Welle.

== Track listing ==
All tracks composed by Joachim Witt; except where noted.

1. "Restlos" "Complete"
2. "Durch die Strassen…" "In the Streets" (lyrics: Witt; music: Harald Gutowski)
3. "Kapitän der Träume" "Captain of Dreams"
4. "Trotzdem schön" "Still Beautiful" (Witt, Harald Gutowski, Annette Humpe)
5. "In die falsche Welt Geboren" "Born in the Wrong World"
6. "Bahia- Maria"
7. "Nur mit Dir" "Only with You"
8. "Hallo- Hallo" "Hello- Hello" (Witt, Harald Gutowski, Annette Humpe)
9. "Nur mal so" (lyrics: Witt; music: Harald Gutowski)
10. "Immer schlimmer" "Worse"

== Personnel ==
- Joachim Witt - vocals, guitar, programming
- Graham Laybourne, Harald Gutowski, Markus Schmidt, Uwe Ziegler - guitar
- Harald Gutowski - bass
- Annette Humpe, Graham Laybourne, Hans-Jörn Brandenburg - keyboards
- Graham Laybourne, Harald Gutowski - programming
- Martin Langer - drums
- Joachim Witt, Jovanka von Willsdorf, Katrin Erichsen, Konstanze Arens, Susan Erichsen - choir
