= Eisenherz =

Studio album by Joachim Witt
- Released: 2002
- Genre: Neue Deutsche Härte
- Length: 51:00
- Language: German
- Label: Epic (Sony Music Entertainment GmbH)

Joachim Witt chronology
Bayreuth 2 (2000)	Eisenherz (2002)	Pop (2004)

Eisenherz is the tenth studio album released by Joachim Witt in 2002.

"Eisenherz" is German for "Iron Heart".

However Prinz Eisenherz is also the German name for the comic strip character Prince Valiant.

== Track listing ==
1. Eisenherz "Ironheart"
2. Du Teufel "You Devil"
3. Wie oft muss ich noch sterben "How often do I have to die"
4. Freundschaft "Friendship"
5. Supergestört und superversaut "Super Disturbed and Super Dirty
6. Ich bin schwul "I'm Gay"
7. Steif "Stiff"
8. Du wirst niemals meine Traenen in Dir seh´n "You'll never see my tears in You"
9. Fliegen "Fly"
10. Wie ein Schrei "Like a Scream"
11. Schwingenschlag "Wingstroke"
12. Trauer liegt überm See "Sadness lies over the Lake"

== Maxi single ==
A maxi single was released in 2002 that featured an exclusive song not on the Eisenherz album called Und die Blumen sind erfroren (And the flowers have frozen to death). The single was very limited and is now a collector's item.
