= Dom (album) =

Studio album by Joachim Witt
- Released: 28 September 2012
- Genre: Neue Deutsche Härte
- Language: German and English
- Label: Sony Music

Joachim Witt chronology
Bayreuth 3 (2006)	Dom (2012)	Neumond (2014)

Singles from DOM
- 1. "Gloria" Released: 28 September 2012

Dom is the thirteenth studio album by German singer Joachim Witt. It was released on 28 September 2012. There are several different versions including a standard version, a limited deluxe edition double album that contains an autobiography, a limited digital edition and vinyl records. This includes the sampled "Retromania" songs on the deluxe edition. The track "Gloria" was released as a single.

== Reception ==
Professional ratings
Review scores
Source	Rating
Orkus	10/10
Rolling Stone (Germany)	3/5 stars
Sonic Seducer	favourable

Dom received mixed echoes in Germany. Rolling Stone delivered a negative review that criticised the electronic parts as being reminiscent of a Leni Riefenstahl film and called the album "kitsch". The Orkus magazine's reviewer noted some kitsch too but praised the theatrical lyrics in an overall very favourable review. He wrote that compared to the previous Bayreuth cycle that featured pain and anger, Witt had become more settled now. Also the Sonic Seducer's review was very positive while noting the quality of the songwriting and the instrumentation.

The album peaked at position 6 in the German Media Control Charts while the single "Gloria" reached number 74.

== Track listing ==
Standard edition and deluxe edition CD 1
No.	Title	English translation	Length
1.	"Gloria"		5:18
2.	"Jetzt geh"	Go Now	4:43
3.	"Tränen"	Tears	4:31
4.	"Blut"	Blood	4:03
5.	"Königreich"	Kingdom	4:06
6.	"Beben"	Tremble	4:27
7.	"Mut eines Kriegers"	A Warrior's Courage	3:56
8.	"Licht im Ozean"	Light In The Ocean	4:04
9.	"Komm nie wieder zurück"	Don't Ever Return	5:31
10.	"Leichtsinn"	Folly	4:52
11.	"Untergehen"	[We Will] Sink	5:29

Deluxe edition CD 2
No.	Title	English translation	Length
1.	"DOM"	Cathedral
2.	"Mädchen"	Girl
3.	"Rose-Marie"
4.	"Shut The Fuck Up"
5.	"Goldener Reiter (Urversion)"	The Golden Knight (original version)
6.	"DIN A4 (Retromania London - Demo)"
7.	"Es war einmal (Retromania London - Demo)"	Once Upon A Time
8.	"Nur Lügen (Retromania London - Demo)"	Only Lies
9.	"Hundert Leiber"	A Hundred Bodies
10.	"Das geht tief"	That Goes Deep
