= Edelweiß (album) =

Studio album by Joachim Witt
- Released: 6 March 1982
- Recorded: September–October 1981
- Studio: Inner Space Studio, Weilerswist, Cologne
- Genre: Neue Deutsche Welle
- Length: 38:23
- Language: German
- Label: WEA (Warner)
- Producer: Joachim Witt, René Tinner

Joachim Witt chronology
Silberblick (1980)	Edelweiß (1982)	Märchenblau (1983)

Edelweiß is the second studio album released by Joachim Witt in 1982.

== Track listing ==
All tracks composed and arranged by Joachim Witt

No.	Title	Length
1.	"Inflation in Paradise"	3:09
2.	"Warden"	4:46
3.	"I'm Going To Africa"	3:41
4.	"Exile"	4:11
5.	"Mother Nature – Or the Echo of Euskirchen"	3:09
6.	"I Am the German Negro"	5:02
7.	"Waiting on the Great Happiness"	3:01
8.	"Because I Am So Lonely"	3:23
9.	"Kuwait"	2:43
10.	"Strict Girl"	5:20
Total length:		38:25

== Personnel ==
- Joachim Witt - vocals, guitar, organ, synthesizer
- Harald Gutowski - bass
- Jaki Liebezeit - drums
- Eva-Maria Gößling - saxophone on "Inflation Im Paradies (Filmmusik)"
