= Bayreuth 3 =

Studio album by Joachim Witt
- Released: 26 January 2006
- Genre: Neue Deutsche Härte
- Length: 69:16
- Language: German
- Label: Megaphon (Germany), Dancing Ferret Discs (US)

Joachim Witt chronology
Pop (2004)	Bayreuth 3 (2006)	Auf Ewig (2007)

Bayreuth 3 is the twelfth studio album and the final chapter of the Bayreuth trilogy, released by Joachim Witt in 2006. A limited-edition version was released, containing a remix of "Wo Versteckt Sich Gott?" by VNV Nation.

== Track listing ==
No.	Title	Length
1.	"Dämmerung (Intro)" (Twilight)	2:08
2.	"Ahhh!!!"	3:51
3.	"Menschen" (Humans)	4:42
4.	"Wem Gehort Das Sternenlicht?" (Who Owns the Starlight?)	5:49
5.	"Schmutz" (Dirt)	4:00
6.	"Wo Versteckt Sich Gott?" (Where Is God Hiding?)	4:01
7.	"Abendrot" (featuring Tilo Wolff; Afterglow)	6:22
8.	"Neuland" (Newland)	4:22
9.	"Hundert Leiber" (Hundreds of Bodies)	3:52
10.	"Leben Im Staub" (Living in Dust)	4:38
11.	"Die Macht" (The Power)	4:11
12.	"Tiefenrausch" (Downrushing)	4:20
13.	"Der Turm (Edel Weisspiraten)" (The Tower (Noble White Pirates))	4:05
14.	"Ich Spreng Den Tag!" (I Blast The Day!)	4:04
15.	"Tief In Der Tiefe" (Deep in the Depth)	4:57
16.	"Wo Versteckt Sich Gott? (VNV Nation Remix)" (Where Is God Hiding?)	4:16
Total length:		1:14:37
