= Silberblick =

1980 album by Joachim Witt

Studio album by Joachim Witt
- Released: December 1980
- Recorded: 1980
- Studios: Inner Space Studio, Weilerswist, Cologne
- Genre: Neue Deutsche Welle
- Length: 39:18
- Language: German
- Label: WEA (Warner)
- Producers: Joachim Witt, René Tinner

Joachim Witt chronology
Silberblick (1980)	Edelweiß (1982)

Silberblick is the debut studio album by Joachim Witt, released in 1980. It sold over 300,000 copies worldwide.

== Track listing ==
All songs written by Joachim Witt, except where noted.

1. "Kosmetik (Ich bin das Glück dieser Erde)" 6:19
2. "Goldener Reiter" 4:41
3. "Der Weg in die Ferne (Heaven)" (lyrics: Witt; music: David Byrne) 4:16
4. "Meine Nerven" 5:35
5. "Ich hab so Lust auf Industrie" 4:25
6. "Mein Schatten (Na, Na, Na, Du Bandit, Du)" 3:59
7. "Ja, Ja..." 3:30
8. "Sonne hat sie gesagt" 9:00

== Personnel ==
- Joachim Witt - vocals, guitar, organ, synthesizer
- Harald Gutowski - bass
- Harald Grosskopf - synthesizer
- Jaki Liebezeit - drums
