= Alexander Wesselsky =

German singer (born 1968)

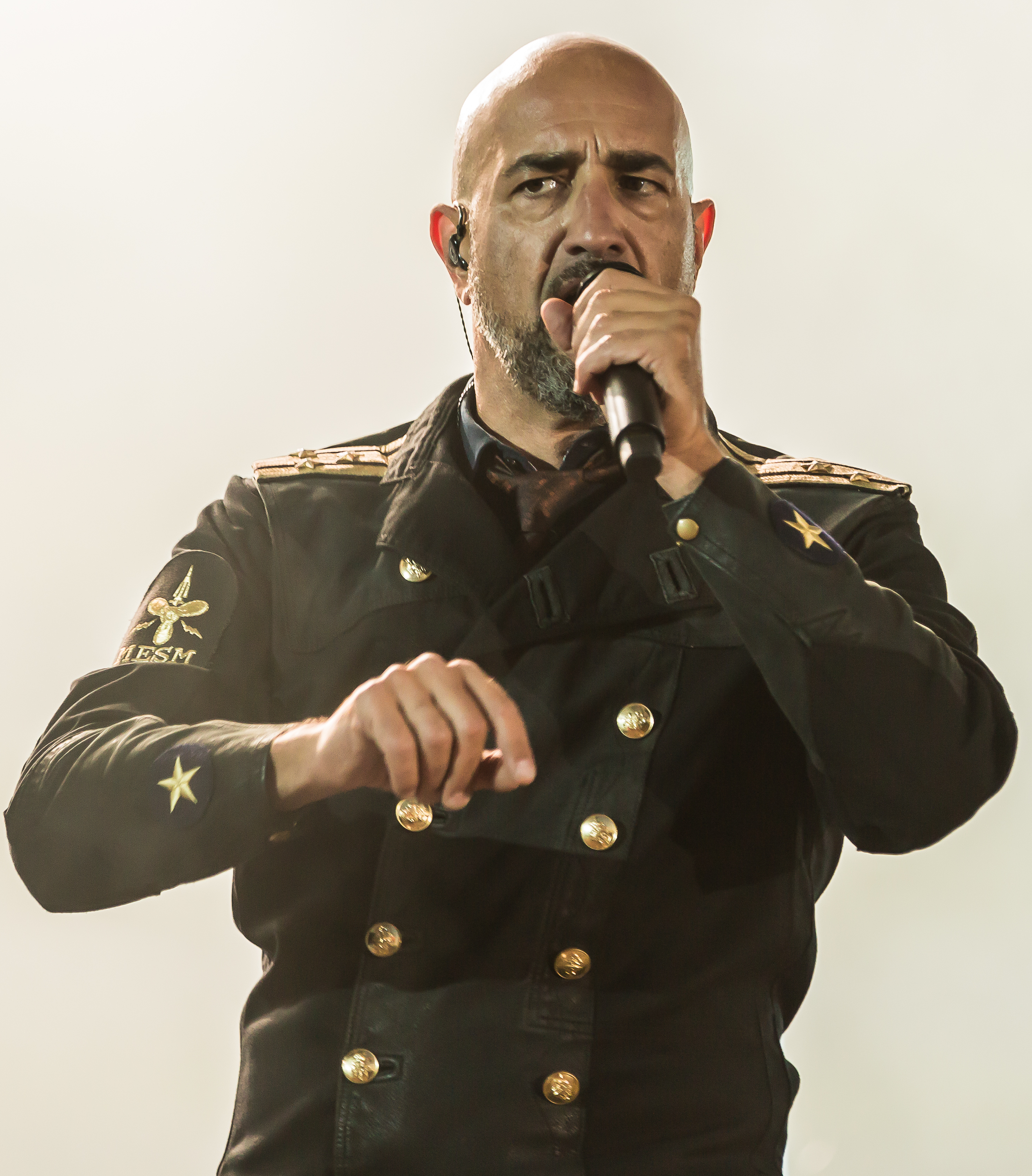
- Wesselsky performing with Eisbrecher in 2018

Background information
- Also known as: Alexx
- Born: 18 November 1968 (age 57); Augsburg, West Germany
- Genres: Neue Deutsche Härte, industrial metal
- Occupations: Singer, songwriter, television presenter
- Years active: 1985–present
- Member of: Eisbrecher
- Formerly of: Megaherz; Dale Arden

Alexander "Alexx" Wesselsky (born 18 November 1968) is a German singer. He is a founder and the lead vocalist of Neue Deutsche Härte band Eisbrecher. He was also a founding member and lead singer of Megaherz, having performed with them for 10 years from 1993 to his departure at the start of 2003.

== Biography ==
In 1985, Dale Arden became Wesselsky's first band, where he performed as lead singer and bassist alongside his best friend Bill Parsons in the early 1980s at a local bar.

=== Megaherz: 1993–2003 ===
Wesselsky was one of the founding member of Megaherz in 1993, writing lyrics and composing, as well as singing. Wesselsky's works had moderate success during his time with Megaherz, his albums Himmelfahrt, released in 2000 and Herzwerk II, released in 2002, both charted in the Media Control Charts at No. 78. His most successful single during his time with Megaherz, Freiflug, was released in 1999 and hit the German alternative charts at No. 7.

Wesselsky left the band officially on 1 January 2003, and was replaced by Mathias Eisholz. In addition to Megaherz, since 1999 he has been working as a studio singer and lyricist writer for several independent projects (among others, a platinum production).

=== Eisbrecher: 2003–present ===
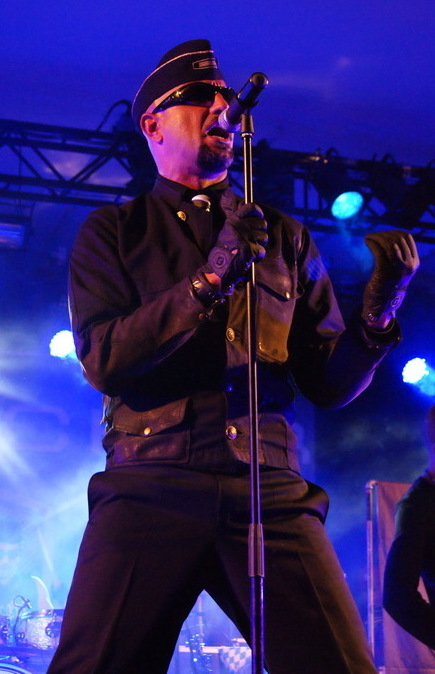
Wesselsky in 2010

Wesselsky joined Noel Pix in late 2002 to form Eisbrecher. Success for Wesselsky continued through Eisbrecher with the 2004 album of the same name, released in January, as it hit the alternative charts in Germany at No. 13.

Eisbrecher's 2006 album, Antikörper, was released in October and hit the Media Control Charts at No. 85. Their next single "Kann denn Liebe Sünde sein?", released in July 2008, hit the alternative charts at No. 3. The studio album Sünde was released in August 2008 and entered the Media Control Charts at a high No. 18. On 16 April 2010, Eisbrecher released their next album, Eiszeit, which hit Germany's chart at No. 5. Their following release, Die Hölle muss warten, was released on 3 February 2012 and charted No. 3 on the German main charts. Schock was released on 21 January 2015 and charted at No. 2 on the German main charts.

Both Die Hölle muss warten and Schock achieved gold status in 2016, after both sold more than 100,000 units respectively. His latest effort, Sturmfahrt, became his first album to hit No. 1 on the main German chart.

In addition to his studio musical career, Wesselsky performed with his bands at many European music festivals, including Hurricane, Nova Rock, Wacken, M'era Luna, Wave-Gotik-Treffen, Hellfest, Graspop Metal Meeting, and Summer Breeze.

=== Television ===
Aside from his musical career, Wesselsky has also presented a television show since 2006, on the German TV channel DMAX, where he acts as a used car broker for an applicant. His screen nickname for the show is Der Checker ("The Checker"). Once he has found a suitable vehicle within the applicant's budget, the car is repaired and tuned at co-presenter's Lina van de Mars's workshop, and is then handed over to the new owner. In 2009, Wesselsky hosted a reality TV show called Schrauber-Showdown. In May 2010, he appeared as himself on the German TV talk show Kölner Treff.

== Discography ==
=== Studio albums ===
Year	Title	Chart positions				
Year	Title	DAC	GER	AUT	SWI	EU
1995	Herzwerk ("Heart-work")	–	–	–	–	–
1997	Wer bist du? ("Who are you?")	–	–	–	–	–
1998	Kopfschuss ("Headshot")	–	–	–	–	–
2000	Himmelfahrt ("Ascension")	–	78	–	–	–
2002	Herzwerk II ("Heart-work II")	–	78	–	–	–
2004	Eisbrecher ("Icebreaker")	13	–	–	–	–
2006	Antikörper ("Antibody")	10	85	–	–	–
2008	Sünde ("Sin")	1	18	–	–	64
2010	Eiszeit ("Ice age")	–	5	34	76	25
2012	Die Hölle muss warten ("Hell Must Wait")	–	3	21	16	–
2015	Schock ("Shock")	–	2	11	16	–
2017	Sturmfahrt ("Stormy voyage")	–	1	10	8	–
2021	Liebe Macht Monster ("Love makes monsters")	–	1	4	11	–
2025	Kaltfront°! ("Cold front")	-	2	7	17	-

=== Singles ===
Megaherz

- 1997: "Gott sein" (To Be God)
- 1998: "Liebestöter" (Passion Killer)
- 1998: "Rock Me Amadeus"
- 1999: "Freiflug" (Free Flight) (#7 in German alternative charts)
- 2000: "Himmelfahrt" (Ascension)

Eisbrecher

- 2003: "Mein Blut" (My Blood)
- 2003: "Fanatica"
- 2006: "Leider" (Unfortunately)
- 2006: "Leider/Vergissmeinnicht" (US limited double-single)
- 2006: "Vergissmeinnicht" (Forget Me Not)
- 2008: "Kann denn Liebe Sünde sein?" (Can Love be a Sin?)
- 2010: "Eiszeit" (Ice Age) (#84 in Germany)
- 2012: "Verrückt" (Insane) (#46 in Germany)
- 2012: "Die Hölle muss warten" (Hell Has to Wait)
- 2012: "Miststück 2012" (Sonofabitch)
- 2013: "10 Jahre Eisbrecher" (10 Years of Eisbrecher)
- 2014: "Zwischen uns" (Between Us)
- 2015: "1000 Narben" (1,000 Scars)
- 2015: "Rot wie die Liebe" (Red Like Love)
- 2017: "Was ist hier los?" (What's Going on Here?)
- 2018: "Das Gesetz" (The Law)

=== EPs ===
Megaherz

- 2007: Freiflug EP: The Early Years (1996–2000)
- 2008: Mann von Welt EP

=== Compilation albums ===
Megaherz

- 2001: Querschnitt
- 2009: Totgesagte leben länger (tracks 1–3, 5, 6, 8, 9, 11, 12, 14)

Eisbrecher

- 2011: Eiskalt (#69 in Germany)
- 2018: Ewiges Eis (#6 in Germany)
- 2020: Schicksalsmelodien (#4 in Germany)

=== Music videos ===
- 1999: "Freiflug" (Free Flight)
- 2004: "Schwarze Witwe" (Black Widow)
- 2005: "Herz steht still" (Heart Stands Still)
- 2006: "Willkommen im Nichts" (Welcome to Nothing)
- 2006: "Vergissmeinnicht" (Forget Me Not)
- 2010: "Eiszeit" (Ice Age)
- 2011: "Verrückt" (Insane)
- 2012: "Die Hölle muss warten" (Hell Has to Wait)
- 2012: "Miststück 2012" (Sonofabitch 2012)
- 2014: "Zwischen uns" (Between Us)
- 2015: "Rot wie die Liebe" (Red Like Love)
- 2017: "Was ist hier los?" (What's Going on Here?)
- 2018: "Das Gesetz" (The Law)
- 2020: "Stossgebet" (Quick Prayer)
- 2020: "Skandal im Sperrbezirk" (Scandal in Prostitution-free Area)
- 2020: "Out of the Dark"
- 2021: "FAKK"
- 2021: "Im Guten, im Bösen" (The Good, The Bad)

=== Appearances ===
- IFF (vocals) – Königin der Nacht
- 2012 – Lord of the Lost (vocals) – Eure Siege
- 2019 – Hamatom (vocals)
