= Ewiges Eis – 15 Jahre Eisbrecher =

20Eisbrecher album

Greatest hits album by Eisbrecher
- Released: 5 October 2018 (Europe)
- Genre: Industrial metal, Neue Deutsche Härte
- Length: 153:27
- Language: German
- Label: Metropolis (United States), Sony Music Entertainment, RCA Deutschland
- Producer: Various

Eisbrecher chronology
Eiskalt (2011)	Ewiges Eis – 15 Jahre Eisbrecher (2018)	Es bleibt kalt! (2023)

Ewiges Eis – 15 Jahre Eisbrecher (German for "Eternal Ice – 15 Years of Eisbrecher") is the first greatest hits album by German Neue Deutsche Härte band Eisbrecher. Released to commemorate the 15th anniversary of the band, it consists of two discs with their greatest hits & some remixes. The release was also accompanied by a brief tour to promote the album.

== Track listing ==
Disc 1 // 2003–2018
No.	Title	Album	Length
1.	"Menschenfresser ("Man Eater")"	Previously unreleased	4:07
2.	"Was Ist Hier Los? ("What's Going on Here?")"	Sturmfahrt	3:33
3.	"Das Gesetz ("The Law")"	Sturmfahrt	3:43
4.	"Wo Geht Der Teufel Hin? ("Where Does the Devil Go?")"	Sturmfahrt	3:43
5.	"1000 Narben ("1000 Scars")"	Schock	3:54
6.	"Rot Wie Die Liebe ("Red Like Love")"	Schock	3:49
7.	"Zwischen Uns ("Between Us")"	Schock	3:39
8.	"Prototyp ("Prototype")"	Die Hölle muss warten	3:23
9.	"Verrückt ("Crazy")"	Die Hölle muss warten	3:23
10.	"Die Hölle muss warten ("Hell Must Wait")"	Die Hölle muss warten	4:04
11.	"Eiszeit ("Ice Age")"	Eiszeit	3:40
12.	"Amok"	Eiszeit	3:55
13.	"Kann Denn Liebe Sünde Sein? ("Can Love Be a Sin?")"	Sünde	4:52
14.	"This is Deutsch ("This is German")"	Sünde	4:52
15.	"Leider ("Unfortunately")"	Antikörper	4:08
16.	"Vergissmeinnicht ("Forget-me-not")"	Antikörper	3:54
17.	"Schwarze Witwe ("Black Widow")"	Eisbrecher	3:54
18.	"Willkommen Im Nichts ("Welcome to Nothing")"	Eisbrecher	4:11
19.	"Himmel, Arsch Und Zwirn (Live) ("Damn it")"	Schock Live	5:35
20.	"Miststück 2012 ("Bitch 2012")"	Die Hölle muss warten	3:24
Total length:			79:17

Disc 2 // Specialties
No.	Title	Album	Length
1.	"Eisbär ("Polar Bear")"	Sturmfahrt	3:59
2.	"Schwarze Witwe (2018) ("Black Widow" (2018))"	Previously unreleased	4:27
3.	"Adrenalin (2013)"	10 Jahre Eisbrecher (Single)	4:06
4.	"Eisbrecher (2013) ("Icebreaker" (2013))"	10 Jahre Eisbrecher (Single)	4:04
5.	"Metall ("Metal")"	Die Hölle muss warten	3:44
6.	"Wenn Zeit Die Wunden Heilt ("If Time Heals the Wounds")"	Die Hölle muss warten	3:26
7.	"Zu Leben ("To Live")"	Die Hölle muss warten	3:46
8.	"Süsswasserfisch ("Sweetwater Fish")"	Schock (iTunes Exclusive)	3:14
9.	"Ozean ("Ocean")"	Rot wie die Liebe (Single)	3:10
10.	"Das Steht Dir Gut" (Rheingold cover ("That Suits You Well"))	Schock	3:54
11.	"Eiskalt Erwischt ("Caught Ice-Cold")"	Eiskalt	3:45
12.	"Kein Wunder ("No Miracle")"	Eiszeit	4:46
13.	"Zeit ("Time")"	Die Hölle muss warten	4:02
14.	"This Is Deutsch" ([SITD] Remix)	Sünde	4:43
15.	"Miststück" (Clawfinger Remix)	Previously unreleased	6:34
16.	"Rot Wie Die Liebe" (Neuroticfish Remix ("Red Like Love"))	Previously unreleased	3:58
17.	"Automat" (Aesthetic Perfection Remix ("Automaton"))	Previously unreleased	4:08
18.	"Was Ist Hier Los?" (Die Krupps Remix ("What's Going on Here?"))	Previously unreleased	4:24
Total length:			74:10

== Charts ==
Chart	Peak position
Austrian Albums (Ö3 Austria)	59
German Albums (Offizielle Top 100)	6
Swiss Albums (Schweizer Hitparade)	95
