= Fanatica =

Single by Eisbrecher

from the album Eisbrecher
- Released: 22 September 2003
- Recorded: 2003
- Genre: Neue Deutsche Härte
- Songwriter(s): Noel Pix, Alexander Wesselsky

Eisbrecher singles chronology
"Mein Blut" (2003)	"Fanatica" (2003)	"Leider" (2006)

"Fanatica" is a song by German Neue Deutsche Härte band Eisbrecher, released as the second single from their self-titled debut album. It is the first of only three Eisbrecher songs so far that include a line in English ("This Is Deutsch" from Sünde is the second, and "Gothkiller" from Eiszeit is sung entirely in English). The single does not include the "Fanatica Club Mix" available on the self-titled album.

== Track listing ==
1. Fanatica – 3:22
2. Angst? - 4:17
3. Fanatica (Maxwell S. Club Mix) – 5:17
4. Fanatica (Extended Mix by Noel Pix) – 5:26
