= Schicksalsmelodien =

2020 studio album of cover songs by Eisbrecher

Studio album by Eisbrecher
- Released: 23 October 2020
- Genre: Neue Deutsche Härte, industrial metal
- Length: 53:55
- Language: German and English
- Label: Metropolis, Sony Music Entertainment, RCA Deutschland
- Producer: Noel Pix, Henning Verlage, Julian Breucker, Christoph Hessler, Maximilian Schauer

Eisbrecher chronology
Sturmfahrt (2017)	Schicksalsmelodien (2020)	Liebe Macht Monster (2021)

Singles from Schicksalsmelodien
- 1. "Stossgebet" Released: 21 May 2020; 2. "Skandal im Sperrbezirk" Released: 18 September 2020; 3. "Anna Lassmichrein Lassmichraus" Released: 7 October 2020

Schicksalsmelodien (German for "Melodies of Destiny") is a cover album by German Neue Deutsche Härte band Eisbrecher. It is a cover album of songs that influenced Eisbrecher members in their youth. It was released in 2020 by Metropolis Records.

== Track listing ==
No.	Title	English translation	Length
1.	"Skandal im Sperrbezirk (Spider Murphy Gang cover)"	Scandal in the Restricted Zone	3:47
2.	"Anna Lassmichrein Lassmichraus (Trio cover)"	Anna Let Me In Let Me Out	3:10
3.	"Disco in Moskau (The Vibrators cover)"	Disco in Moscow	3:57
4.	"Out of the Dark (Falco cover)"		3:39
5.	"Stossgebet (Powerwolf cover)"	Hurried Prayer	3:56
6.	"All We Are (Warlock cover)"		3:05
7.	"Goldener Reiter (Joachim Witt cover)"	Golden Rider	4:00
8.	"Freiflug (Megaherz cover)"	Free Flight	3:51
9.	"Bitte Bitte (Die Ärzte cover)"	Please Please	3:08
10.	"Eins, Zwei, Polizei (Mo-Do cover)"	One, Two, Police	3:54
11.	"Flieger Grüss Mir Die Sonne (Hans Albers cover)"	Aviator, Greet the Sun for Me	3:14
12.	"Menschenfresser (Rio Reiser cover)"	Man-Eater	4:08
13.	"Das Steht dir gut (Rheingold cover)"	That Suits You Well	3:56
14.	"Schwarzes Blut (ASP cover)"	Black Blood	3:58
15.	"Schicksal"	Fate	2:13

- Track 12 had previously been released as part of the Compilation Album Ewiges Eis – 15 Jahre Eisbrecher.
- Track 13 had previously been released on the Special Edition of the Schock album.
- Track 14 had previously been released as a B-Side on the "Volle Kraft voraus" Single.

== Charts ==
=== Weekly charts ===
Chart	Peak position
Austrian Albums (Ö3 Austria)	17
German Albums (Offizielle Top 100)	4
Swiss Albums (Schweizer Hitparade)	27

=== Year-end charts ===
Chart 2020	Peak position
German Albums Chart	88
