= Mein Blut =

Single by Eisbrecher

from the album Eisbrecher
- Released: 2003
- Recorded: 2003
- Genre: Neue Deutsche Härte
- Length: 19:09
- Songwriters: Noel Pix, Alexander Wesselsky

Eisbrecher singles chronology
"Mein Blut" (2003)	"Fanatica" (2003)

"Mein Blut" (German for "My blood") is a song by German Neue Deutsche Härte band Eisbrecher from their self-titled debut album, and their first single overall.

== Track listing ==
1. Mein Blut (Kurzschnitt) (short edit) – 3:24
2. Mein Blut (Album-Schnitt) (album version) – 4:25
3. Mein Blut (Pix Mischung) (Pix mix) – 5:42
4. Mein Blut (Carlos Perón Neumischung) (Carlos Perón new mix) – 5:38
