= Noel Pix =

German musician (born 1971)

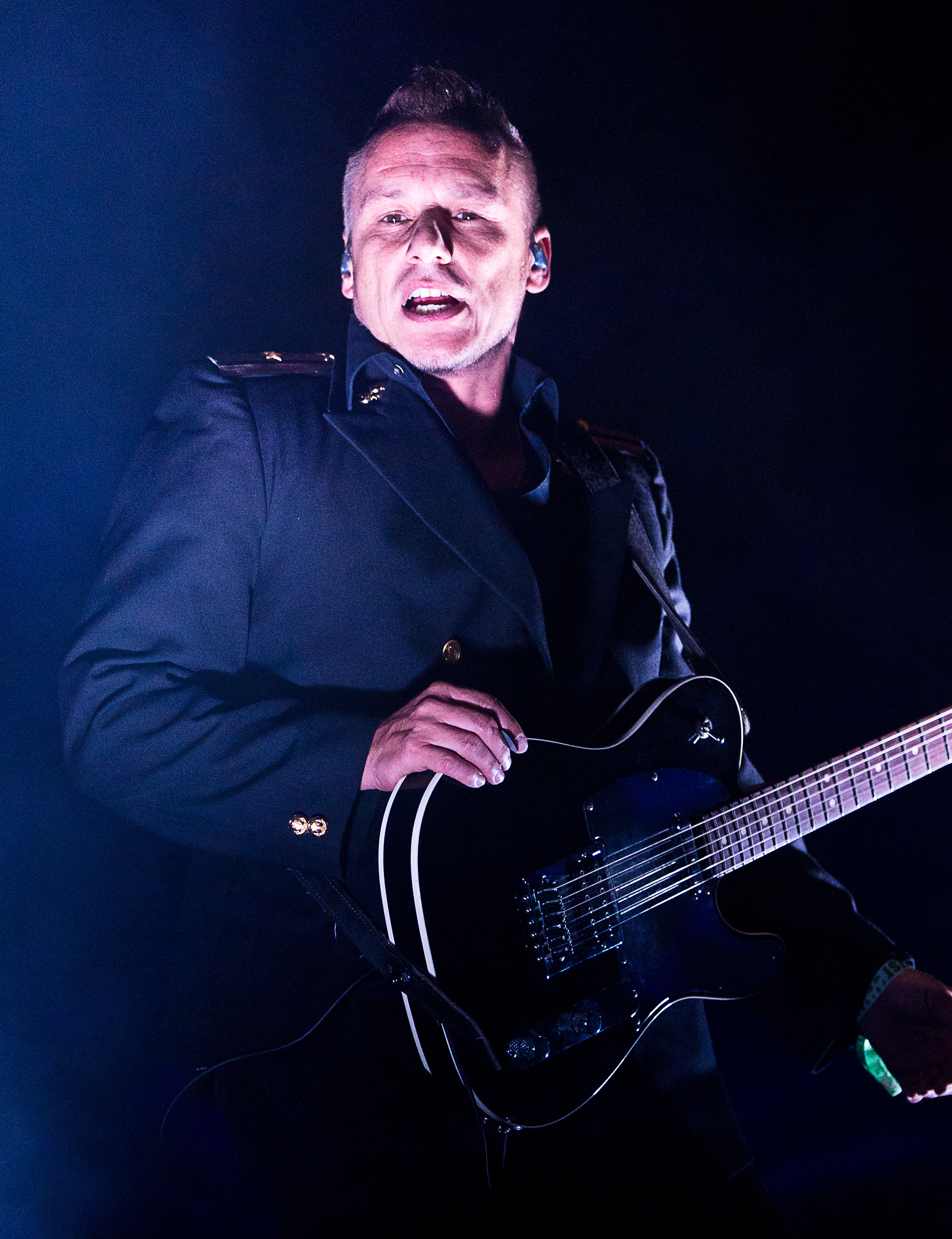
- Pix performing with Eisbrecher in 2015

Background information
- Also known as: Housemaster Kinky J
- Born: Jochen Seibert; 25 March 1971 (age 55); Munich, West Germany
- Genres: Neue Deutsche Härte, industrial metal, house
- Occupations: Musician, producer
- Instruments: Guitar, programming, keyboards
- Years active: 1994–present
- Formerly of: Eisbrecher, Megaherz
- Website: noelpix.de

Jochen "Noel Pix" Seibert (born 25 March 1971) is a German rock and house musician, best known as a founder, former lead guitarist, and programmer of the Neue Deutsche Härte band Eisbrecher, which he left in the beginning of 2024.

He previously played guitar and keyboards for the band Megaherz. He releases his house tracks under the alias Housemaster Kinky J.

Noel Pix sings the German translations of theme songs for anime series like Pokémon, Digimon or Dragon Ball Z. He had one hit in the German, Austrian and Swiss singles chart: The theme song for the second season of Pokémon (Pokémon Welt) peaked at No. 50 in Germany, No. 30 in Austria and No. 49 in Switzerland.

== Discography ==
=== Singles ===
Solo

- 1996: "Kinky, Freaky, Funky" (as "Housemaster Kinky J")
- 1999: "Chicci Chicci" (as "Noel Pix")
- 2000: "Pokémon Welt" (as "Noel Pix")

Megaherz

- 1998: "Liebestöter"
- 1998: "Rock Me Amadeus"
- 1999: "Freiflug"
- 2000: "Himmelfahrt"

Eisbrecher

- 2003: "Mein Blut"
- 2003: "Fanatica"
- 2006: "Leider"
- 2006: "Leider/Vergissmeinnicht" (US limited double single)
- 2006: "Vergissmeinnicht"
- 2008: "Kann denn Liebe Sünde sein?"
- 2010: "Eiszeit"
- 2012: "Verrückt"
- 2012: "Die Hölle muss warten"
- 2012: "Miststück 2012"
- 2013: "10 Jahre Eisbrecher"
- 2014: "Zwischen uns"
- 2015: "1000 Narben"
- 2015: "Rot wie die Liebe"
- 2017: "Was ist hier los?"

=== Albums ===
Megaherz

- 1997: Wer bist du? – tracks 5 and 14
- 1998: Kopfschuss – keyboards, guitar and programming
- 2000: Himmelfahrt – keyboards, guitar and programming
- 2001: Querschnitt – all tracks except 2, 4, 14, 16
- 2002: Herzwerk II – thanked by the band in the credits
- 2009: Totgesagte leben länger – tracks 2, 3, 8, 9, 12

Eisbrecher

- 2004: Eisbrecher – instruments
- 2006: Antikörper – instruments
- 2008: Sünde – instruments
- 2010: Eiszeit – instruments
- 2012: Die Hölle muss warten – instruments
- 2015: Schock – instruments
- 2017: Sturmfahrt – instruments
- 2021: Liebe Macht Monster – instruments

Other

- Toggo United (album) (with other musicians as "Toggo United Allstars")

=== Soundtracks ===
- Beyblade V-Force
- Dragon Ball Z Vol. 1
- Dragon Ball Z Vol. 2
- Detective Conan
- Pokémon - Schnapp' sie dir alle!
- Pokémon 2 - Die Macht des Einzelnen
- Pokémon 3 - Der Ultimative Soundtrack
- Pretty Cure
- Monster Rancher
- Digimon - Digital Monsters
- Digimon - Digital Monsters Vol. 2
- Digimon - Digital Monsters Vol. 3
- Digimon - Digital Monsters Season 4
- One Piece
- Yu-Gi-Oh!
