= CO2 (disambiguation) =

CO_{2} is the molecular formula for carbon dioxide.

CO2, Co2 or C02 may also refer to:

== Arts and entertainment ==
- CO_{2} (album), a music album by Stahlmann
- CO_{2} (opera), an Italian opera by Giorgio Battistelli
- CO_{2} (film), a 2018 Burmese film

== Places ==
- Grand Geneva Resort Airport (FAA LID code)
- CO2, a postcode district in the CO postcode area, England

== Science and technology ==
- Conway group Co2, a mathematical group
- Malignant neoplasm of other and unspecified parts of tongue (ICD-10 code); See Oral cancer
- Co_{2}, a diatomic molecule of cobalt
