= Leider =

Single by Eisbrecher

from the album Antikörper
- Released: 14 July 2006
- Recorded: 2006
- Genre: Neue Deutsche Härte
- Songwriters: Erik Damkoehler; Noel Pix; Alexander Wesselsky

Eisbrecher singles chronology
| "Fanatica" (2003) | "Leider" (2006) | "Vergissmeinnicht" (2006) |

"Leider" (German for Unfortunately) is a song by German Neue Deutsche Härte band Eisbrecher and the first single from their album Antikörper. On 22 August 2006, a double-single titled "Leider/Vergissmeinnicht" was released in the US. It combines both of Eisbrecher singles from their second album.

== Track listing ==
1. "Leider" – 4:09
2. "Leider (Noel Pix Klingenklang-Mix)" – 4:40
3. "Leider (The Retrosic-Mix)" – 4:57
4. "Willkommen im Nichts" (Multimedia track)
