= Adamant (album) =

Studio album by Stahlmann
- Released: 19 April 2013
- Genre: Neue Deutsche Härte
- Length: 40:06 (standard edition); 47:39 (limited edition)
- Label: AFM

Stahlmann chronology
Quecksilber (2012)	Adamant (2013)	CO2 (2015)

Singles from Adamant
- 1. "Süchtig" Released: 1 March 2013; 2. "Schwarz" Released: 5 April 2013

Adamant is the third studio album by German rock band Stahlmann, released in 2013.

The album reached number 34 on the Official German Charts in May 2013.

== Track listing ==
No.	Title	English translation	Length
1.	"Die Welt verbrennt"	The World Burns	3:54
2.	"Süchtig"	Addicted	3:21
3.	"Wenn der Regen kommt"	When the Rain Comes	4:09
4.	"Schwarz"	Black	3:09
5.	"Leuchtfeuer"	Beacon	4:26
6.	"Adrenalin"	Adrenaline	3:12
7.	"Der Schmied"	The Blacksmith	3:55
8.	"Paradies"	Paradise	3:33
9.	"Nackt"	Naked	3:30
10.	"Tempel der Lust"	Temple of Desire	3:22
11.	"Dämonin"	Demoness	3:35
Total length:			40:06

Limited edition bonus tracks
No.	Title	English translation	Length
12.	"Traumfrau"	Dream Girl	3:36
13.	"Licht"	Light	3:57
Total length:			47:39
