= Der letzte Tag (disambiguation) =

"Der letzte Tag" is a 2006 song by Tokio Hotel.

Der letzte Tag (German for "The Last Day") may also refer to:

- "Der letzte Tag", 1956 radio play by Günter Eich with Ilse Aichinger
- Der letzte Tag, silent film directed by Max Mack
- "Der letzte Tag", 2004 song by Elis from the album Dark Clouds in a Perfect Sky
- "Der letzte Tag", 2021 song by Max Giesinger
- "Der letzte Tag", 2015 song by Stahlmann from the album CO2
- "Der letzte Tag", 1993 song by Die Toten Hosen from the album Kauf MICH!
