= Bastard (Stahlmann album) =

Stahlmann album

Studio album by Stahlmann
- Released: 16 June 2017 (EU); 7 July 2017 (North America)
- Genre: Neue Deutsche Härte, industrial metal
- Length: 40:09
- Label: AFM

Stahlmann chronology
CO2 (2015)	Bastard (2017)	Kinder der Sehnsucht (2019)

Bastard is the fifth studio album by German Neue Deutsche Härte band Stahlmann, released in 2017. The album peaked at number 36 on the Official German Charts in late June 2017.

== Track listing ==
No.	Title	English translation	Length
1.	"Leitwolf"	Lead Wolf	3:23
2.	"Judas"		3:12
3.	"Bastard"		3:13
4.	"Nichts spricht wahre Liebe frei"	Nothing Lets True Love Off the Hook	4:22
5.	"Wächter"	Watcher	4:12
6.	"Von Glut zu Asche"	From Embers to Ashes	3:50
7.	"Alptraum"	Nightmare	3:21
8.	"Dein Gott"	Your God	3:14
9.	"Schwarz und Weiss"	Black and White	3:26
10.	"Supernova"		4:28
11.	"Military Lapdance"		3:28

== Reception ==
Metal music reviewer Angry Metal Guy gave the album a rating of 2/5 ("disappointing"), saying that "It lacks the clinical harshness of true industrial and the aggressive danger of metal. It’s intangibly insubstantial, a sugary treat rather than a satisfactory meal. It’s much too safe.". Metalblast gave the album a 3/5, saying that the album "Just doesn't bring much to the table in terms of original or uncommon content", however praised it for "Clean production" and "Clear mixing of the instrumental components".

== Singles ==
- "Bastard"/"Nichts spricht wahre Liebe frei" – topped German club charts.
