= Eiszeit =

Eiszeit may refer to:

- Ice Age (1975 film) (German: Eiszeit), a 1975 West German drama film
- Eiszeit (song), an NDW (Neue Deutsche Welle) cult song from the German band Ideal from the album Der Ernst des Lebens
- Eiszeit (album), an album by Eisbrecher
