= Leider/Vergissmeinnicht =

Single by Eisbrecher

from the album Antikörper
- Released: August 22, 2006
- Genre: Industrial metal
- Length: 31:25
- Label: Dancing Ferret

Eisbrecher singles chronology
| "Leider" (2006) | "Leider/Vergissmeinnicht" (2006) | "Vergissmeinnicht" (2006) |

"Leider/Vergissmeinnicht" (Regrettably/Forget-me-not) is a US limited-edition double single from the German Industrial rock band Eisbrecher. It has a running time of over 30 minutes. It combines all the tracks from "Leider" and 'Vergissmeinnicht", as well as two videos.

== Track listing ==
1. Leider (Radio Cut) - 4:07
2. Vergissmeinnicht (Radio Mix) - 3:52
3. Leider (The Retrosic Mix) - 4:57
4. Wie Tief? (How Deep?) - 4:23
5. Vergissmeinnicht (Vergissmeinmix Mix) - 4:29
6. Leider (Noel Pix Klingenklang Mix) - 4:37
7. Vergissmeinnicht (Phase III Mix) - 5:32
8. Willkommen Im Nichts (Multimediatrack) - 4:34
9. Schwarze Witwe (Making of) (Multimediatrack) - 3:52
