= Verrückt (disambiguation) =

Verrückt is a German word meaning "insane" or "crazy" and may refer to:

- Verrückt, a water slide at Schlitterbahn in Kansas City, Kansas, United States, formerly the tallest in the world.
- Downloadable content in the video games Call of Duty: World at War, Call of Duty: Black Ops, and Call of Duty: Black Ops III
- A song on the album Die Hölle muss warten by the Neue Deutsche Härte band Eisbrecher
