= Quecksilber =

Studio album by Stahlmann
- Released: 13 March 2012
- Genre: Neue Deutsche Härte
- Length: 36:55
- Label: AFM

Stahlmann chronology
| Stahlmann (2010) | Quecksilber (2012) | Adamant (2013) |

Quecksilber ("quicksilver") is the second studio album by German rock band Stahlmann, released in 2012.

The album reached number 39 on the Official German Charts in February 2012.

== Track listing ==
| No. | Title | English translation | Length |
|---|---|---|---|
| 1. | "Engel der Dunkelheit" | Angel of Darkness | 3:38 |
| 2. | "Spring nicht" | Don't Jump | 3:18 |
| 3. | "Tanzmaschine" | Dance Machine | 3:29 |
| 4. | "Asche" | Ashes | 4:06 |
| 5. | "Mein Leib" | My Body | 3:47 |
| 6. | "Am Grunde" | At the Bottom | 3:25 |
| 7. | "Götter" | Gods | 3:28 |
| 8. | "Schmerz" | Pain | 4:07 |
| 9. | "Diener" | Servant | 3:39 |
| 10. | "Tanzmaschine (Club Remix)" | Dance Machine | 3:58 |

Limited edition
| No. | Title | English translation | Length |
|---|---|---|---|
| 12. | "Herzschlag" | Heartbeat | 3:30 |
| 13. | "Tanzmaschine (Single Version)" | Dance Machine | 4:01 |
| 14. | "Mein Leib (Club Remix)" | My Body | 3:48 |
