= Stahlmann =

German rock band

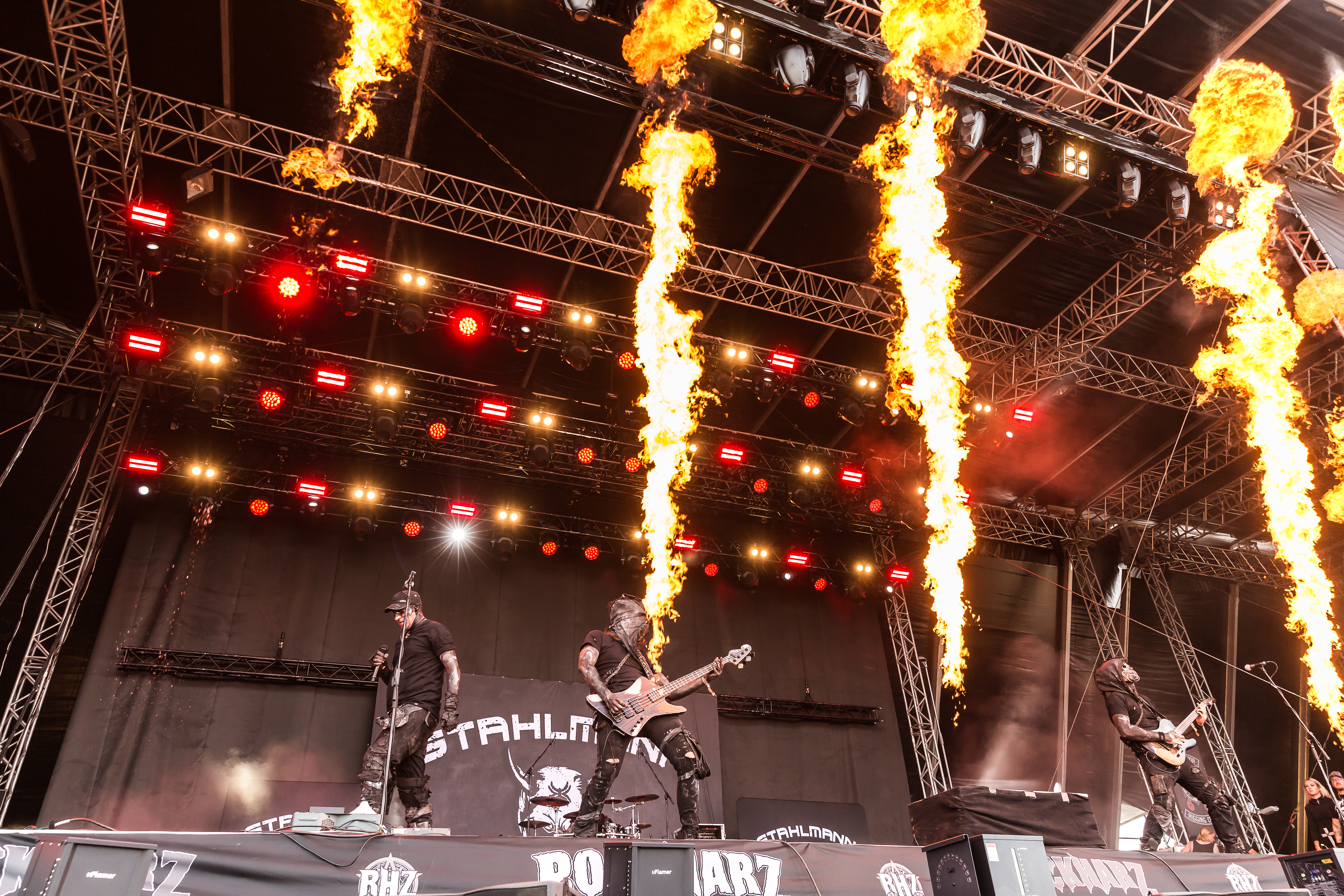
- Stahlmann at Rockharz 2026

Background information
- Origin: Göttingen, Germany
- Genres: Neue Deutsche Härte, industrial metal
- Years active: 2008–present
- Label: AFM Records
- Members: Martin "Mart" Soer; Eugen; Mario; Tacki
- Past members: Alexander Scharfe; Niklas Kahl; Mathhias Müller; Max Thiele; Frank Herzig; Oliver "O-Lee" Schmidt; Tobias "Tobi" Berkefeld; Johannes (Duese) Thon; Neill Freiwald; AblaZ
- Website: stahlmann-band.de
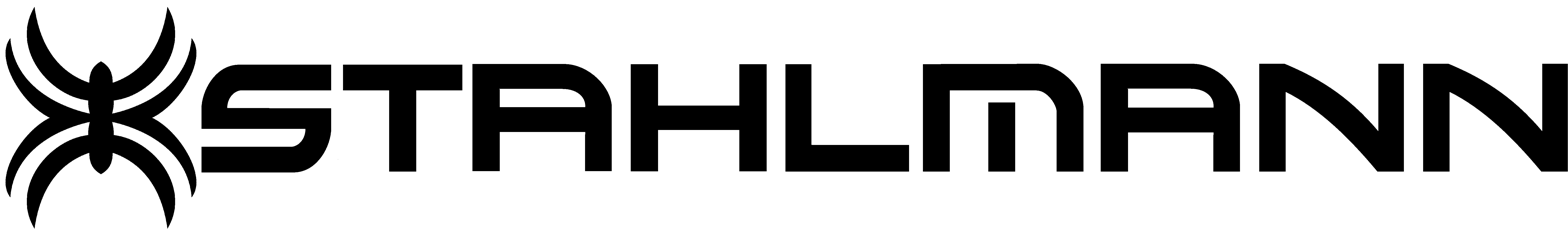

Stahlmann (lit. "Steelman") is a German Neue Deutsche Härte band that formed in Göttingen in 2008.

== History ==
=== Formation debut album (2008–2010) ===
Martin Soer met Alexander Scharfe in 2008 and formed the band Stahlmann later that year, writing their own songs. Soon after Tobi B joined and in 2009, the debut EP Herzschlag was released which entered the top 20 of the Deutsche Alternative Charts for four weeks. Following Herzschlag Stahlmann performed with well-known artists such as Doro, In Extremo and Saltatio Mortis.

Dirk "Fire-Abend" Feierabend and Oliver "O-Lee" Schmidt joined in 2009. Stahlmann went on a tour in 2010 presented by the music magazine Zillo. The single "Hass mich...lieb mich" and debut album Stahlmann were released in September 2010 on AFM Records. At the same time the band began a tour supporting for Eisbrecher in Germany, Austria and Switzerland.

=== Lineup changes Quecksilber and Adamant (2011–2013) ===
For personal reasons Alex left the band, but he still occasionally performs with the group in concert. In late 2011, the group added a new bassist, Ablation (AblaZ). Also performing in live performances were guitarists Sid Armageddon (Sid Armageddon), Mueller Mathis (Mathis Müller), Nicklas Kaalam (Niklas Kahl), and Dimitrios Gatsios (Dimitrios Tacki Gatsios).

Despite their busy concert schedule, Stahlmann in 2011 released the two singles, "Tanzmaschine" and "Stalwittchen". The second album Quecksilber was released on 20 January 2012. "We had eight weeks to master the sound we wanted in one of the best studios of the country. We could try to accurately convey our vision of the album," recalls Martin after recording in March.

In early 2012, they released a single, "Spring nicht".

In mid-2012, it was announced that the band was in the studio recording for a new album. The album titled "Adamant" was released 19 April 2013. The single "Süchtig" and was released 1 March 2013 and on 5 April 2013 they released the second single "Schwarz".

In fall 2013, Stahlmann toured with Vlad in Tears performing five shows throughout Germany.

The band is known to use silver body paint on stage.

== Gallery ==
Stahlmann, band members at Rockharz 2026

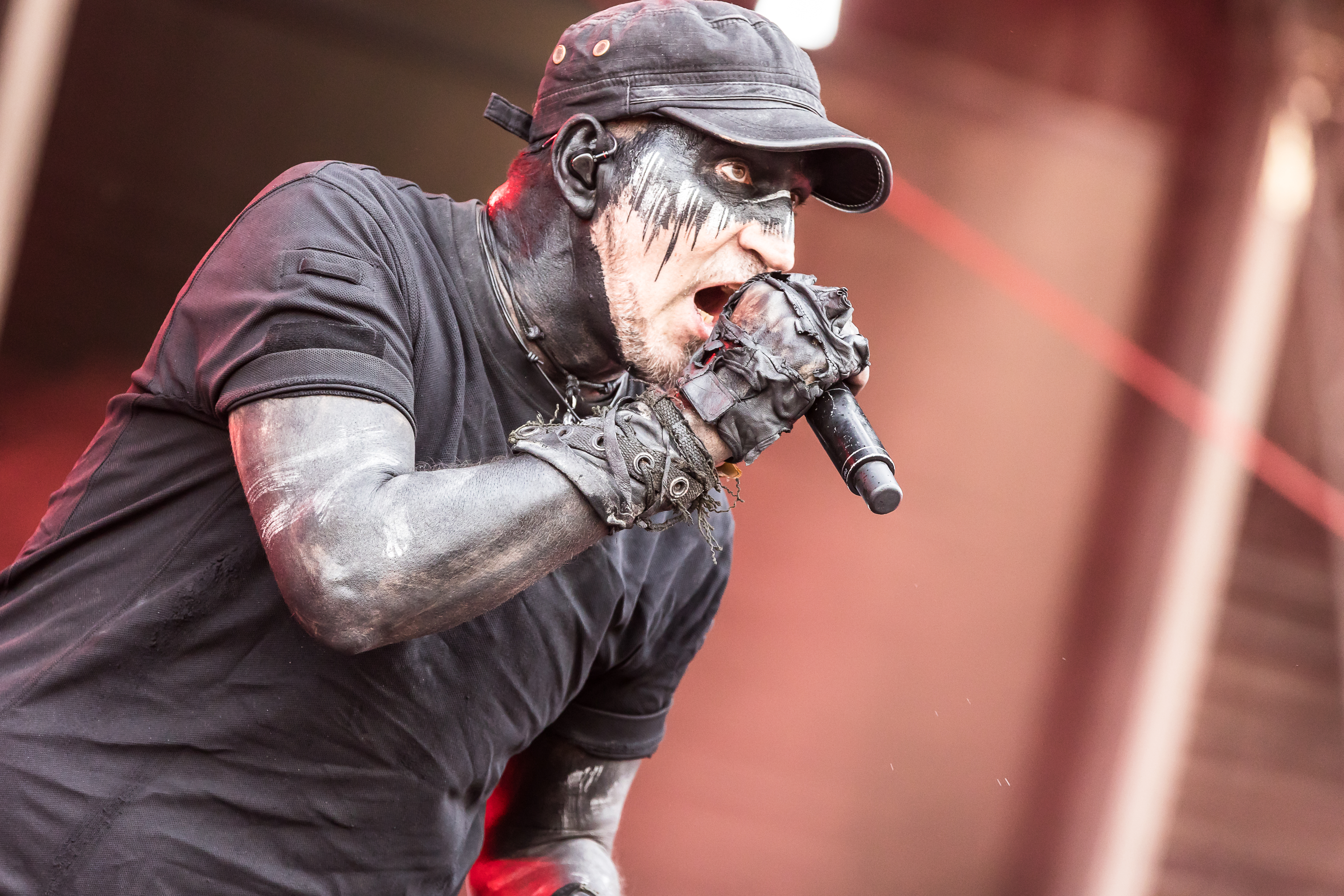
Martin Soer, vocals

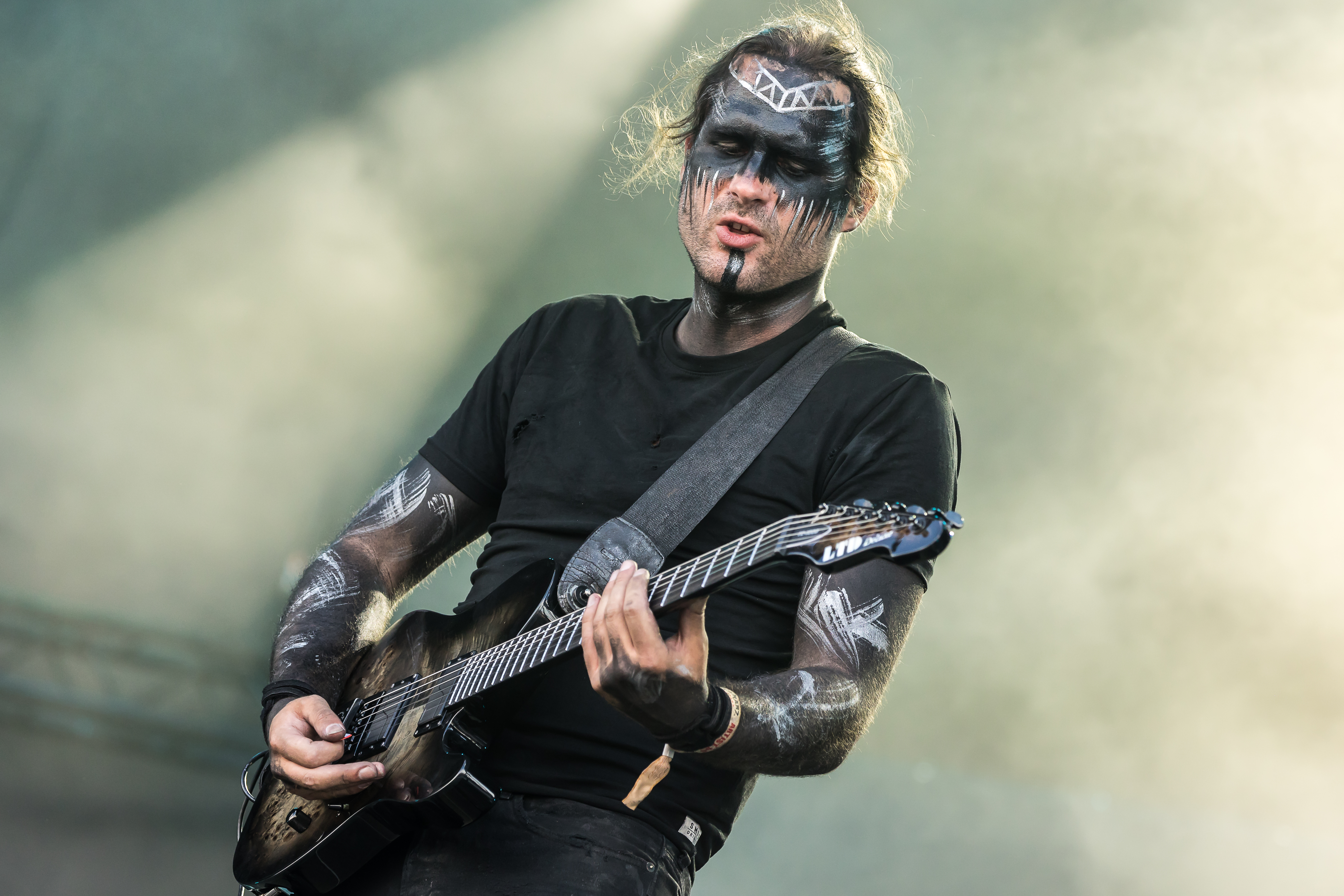
Mario Sobotka, guitars

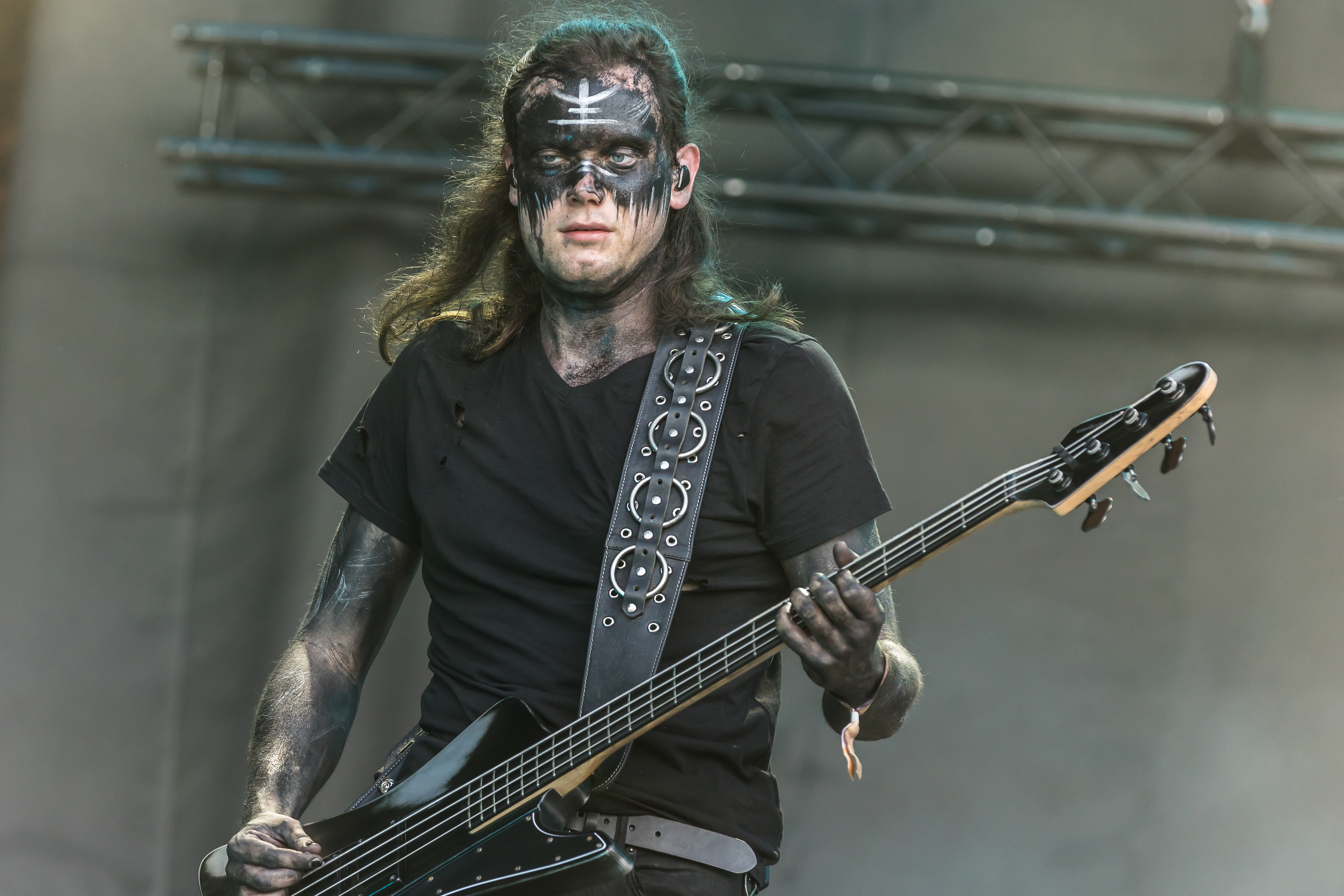
Mathis „Terror“ Marks, bass

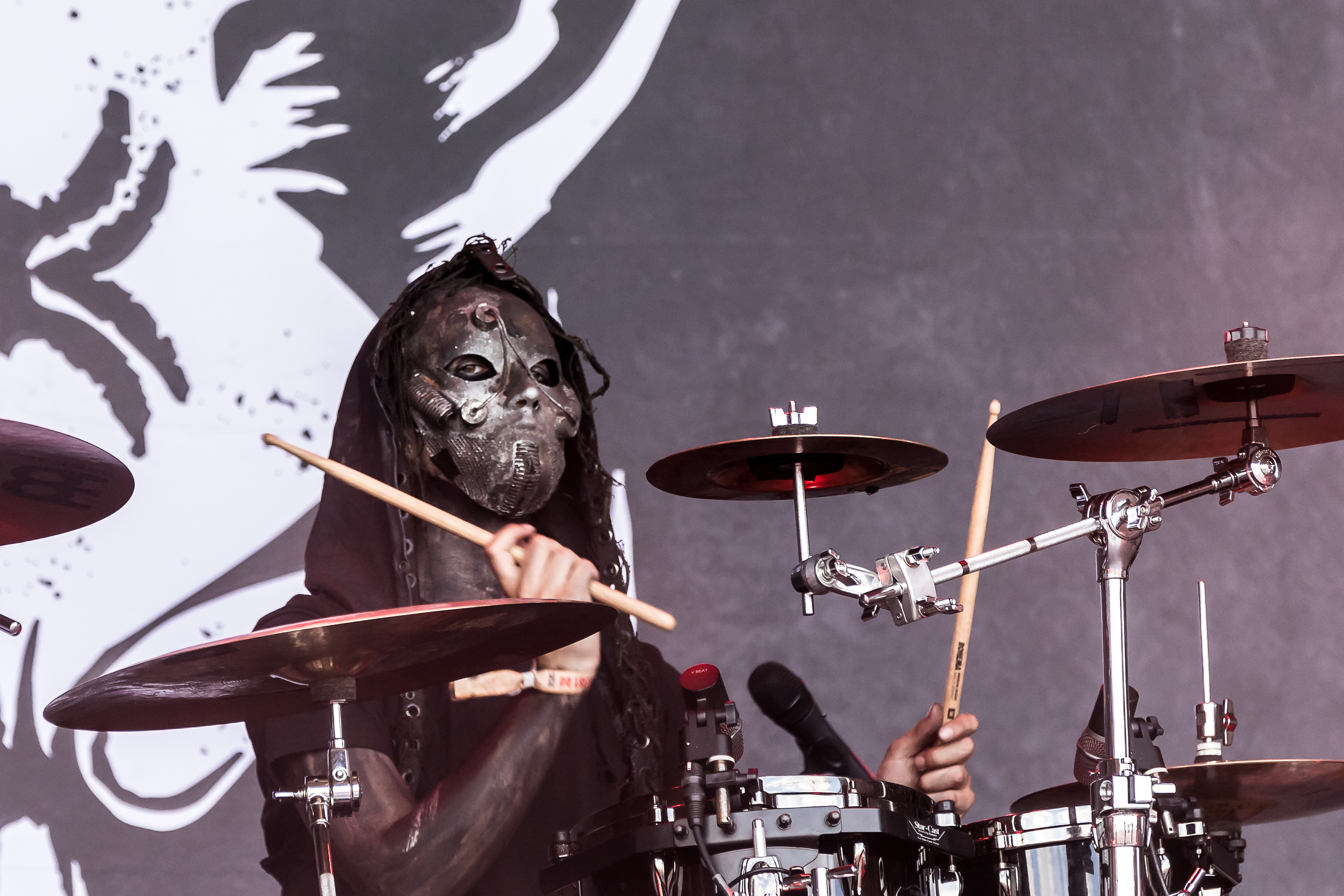
Keylipp „K.“ Dallmann, drums

== Discography ==
Studio albums

- 2010: Stahlmann
- 2012: Quecksilber (#39 in Germany)
- 2013: Adamant (#34 in Germany)
- 2015: CO2 (#22 in Germany)
- 2017: Bastard (#36 in Germany)
- 2019: Kinder der Sehnsucht (#37 in Germany)
- 2021: Quarz
- 2024: Phosphor

EP

- Herzschlag (2009)
- Addendum (2023)

Singles

- "Hass mich...lieb mich" (2010)
- "Stahlwittchen" (2011)
- "Tanzmaschine" (2011)
- "Spring nicht" (2012)
- "Süchtig" (2013)
- "Schwarz" (2013)
- "Plasma" (2015)
- "Nichts spricht wahre Liebe frei" (2017)
- "Bastard (2017)
- "Kinder der Sehnsucht" (2019)
- "Die Besten" (2019)
- "Wahrheit oder Pflicht" (2019)
- "Tanzen" (2023)
- "Luxusuniform" (2024)
- "Interstellar" (2024)
- "Asche zu Asche" (2024)

Music videos

- 2010: "Hass mich...lieb mich"
- 2011: "Stahlwittchen"
- 2011: "Tanzmaschine"
- 2012: "Spring nicht"
- 2013: "Schwarz"
- 2015: "Plasma"
- 2017: "Nichts spricht wahre Liebe frei"
- 2017: "Bastard"
- 2019: "Kinder der Sehnsucht"
- 2019: "Die Besten"

== Reviews ==
- metal.de said that the band's self-titled debut album was "too smoothed out, too radio-friendly, and without any sharp edges."
- The songs from their EP Herzschlag received more than convincing reviews on the website nachaktiv-web.de
- The SPINE praises the singing on the debut album Stahlmann, whereas other magazines stated that it was "lacking originality".
