= Liebe Macht Monster =

2021 studio album by Eisbrecher

Liebe macht Monster

Studio album by Eisbrecher
- Released: 12 March 2021
- Recorded: 2020–2021
- Genre: Neue Deutsche Härte, industrial metal
- Length: 56:23
- Label: Sony, Metropolis

Eisbrecher chronology
Schicksalsmelodien (2020)	Liebe macht Monster (2021)	Kaltfront°! (2025)

Singles from Liebe macht Monster
- 1. "FAKK" Released: 15 January 2021; 2. "Es lohnt sich nicht ein Mensch zu sein" Released: 10 February 2021; 3. "Im Guten im Bösen" Released: 26 February 2021

Liebe macht Monster (German for "love makes monsters"), sometimes also spelled Liebe Macht Monster ("Love, Power, Monsters"), is the eighth studio album by German Neue Deutsche Härte band Eisbrecher. It was released in 2021 by Metropolis Records. It is the last album with co-founder and lead guitarist Jochen "Noel Pix" Seibert, who left the band in February 2024.

== Track listing ==
No.	Title	English translation	Length
1.	"Es lohnt sich nicht ein Mensch zu sein"	It's not worth it to be human	4:15
2.	"FAKK"	deliberate misspelling of FUCK	4:10
3.	"Nein Danke"	No thanks	3:43
4.	"Im Guten im Bösen"	In good in bad	4:57
5.	"Frommer Mann"	Devout man	3:09
6.	"Dagegen" (feat. Dero Goi)	Against it	4:07
7.	"Liebe macht Monster"	Love makes monsters	4:13
8.	"Systemsprenger"	System crasher	3:46
9.	"Wer bin ich"	Who am I	4:14
10.	"Himmel"	Heaven	4:13
11.	"Kontrollverlust"	Loss of control	3:41
12.	"Leiserdrehen"	Volume down	3:36
13.	"High society"		3:54
14.	"Es lebe der Tod"	Long live death	4:25
Total length:			56:23

== Charts ==
=== Weekly charts ===
Chart (2021)	Peak position
Austrian Albums (Ö3 Austria)	4
German Albums (Offizielle Top 100)	1
Swiss Albums (Schweizer Hitparade)	11
