= Vergissmeinnicht (Eisbrecher song) =

Single by Eisbrecher

from the album Antikörper
- Released: 25 August 2006
- Recorded: 2006
- Genre: Neue Deutsche Härte
- Songwriter(s): Maximilian Schauer; Noel Pix; Alexander Wesselsky

Eisbrecher singles chronology
"Leider" (2006)	"Vergissmeinnicht" (2006)	"Kann denn Liebe Sünde sein?" (2008)

"Vergissmeinnicht" (German for Forget-me-not) is a song by German Neue Deutsche Härte band Eisbrecher and the second single from their album Antikörper. It is considered to be one of their most popular songs up today. On 22 August 2006, a double-single "Leider/Vergissmeinnicht" was released in the US; it combines both of Eisbrecher singles from their second album.

A music video for "Vergissmeinnicht" was made which features Alexander Wesselsky and Noel Pix acting in a dark place, with Wesselsky being abused by a woman who ends the video by locking him in a casket.

== Track listing ==
1. Vergissmeinnicht – 3:54
2. Vergissmeinnicht (VergissmeinMix) – 5:33
3. Wie tief? – 4:24
4. Vergissmeinnicht (Phase II Mix) - 4:29
5. Schwarze Witwe (Making-of multimedia track)
