= Eisbrecher =

German rock band

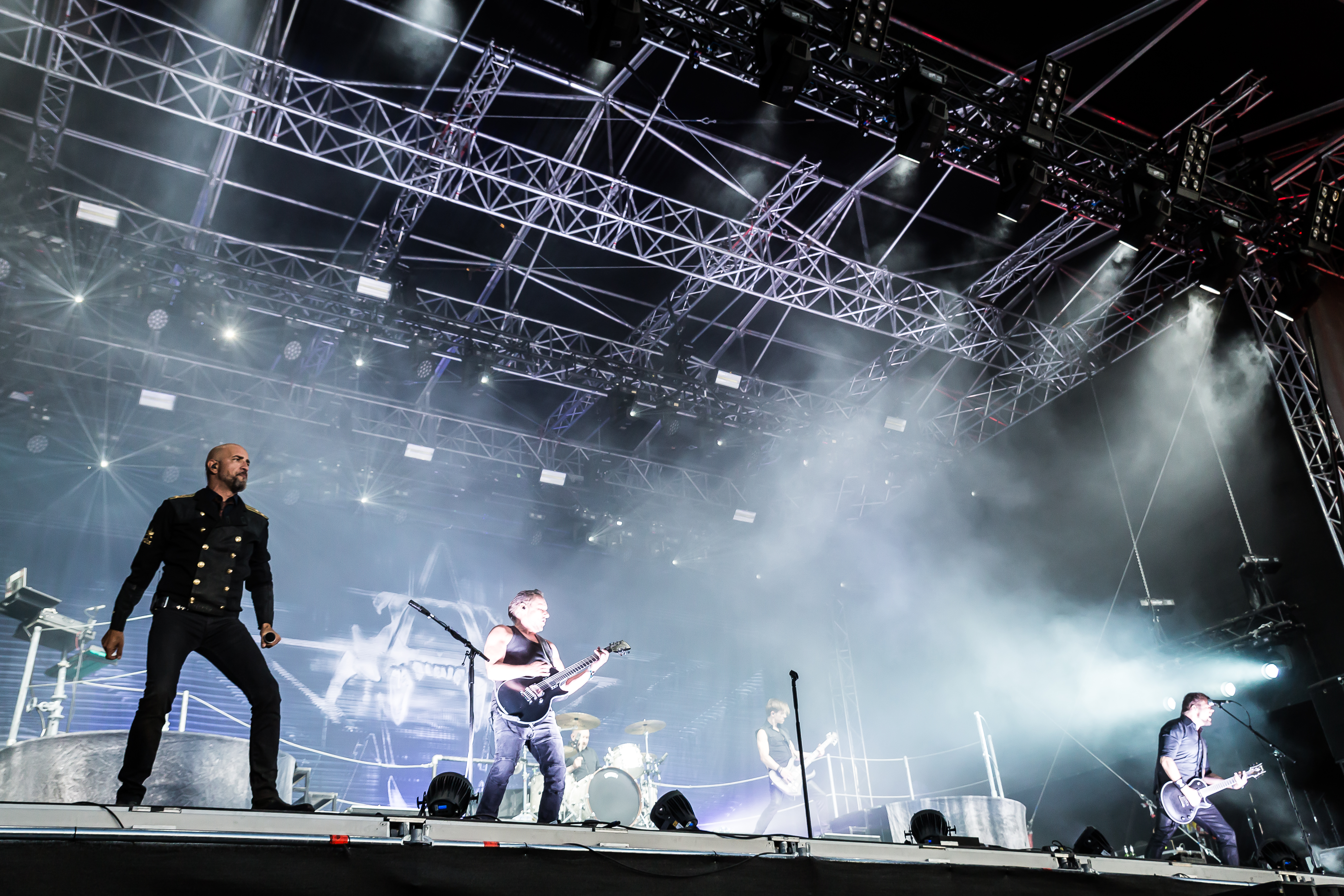
- Eisbrecher at Rockharz Open Air 2018

Background information
- Origin: Fürstenfeldbruck, Germany
- Genres: Neue Deutsche Härte; industrial metal
- Years active: 2003–present
- Labels: ZYX; Dancing Ferret; AFM; Metropolis; SME; Columbia
- Members: Alexx Wesselsky; Rupert Keplinger; Jürgen Plangger; Marc "Micki" Richter; Achim Färber; Maximilian Schauer
- Past members: Noel Pix; Felix "Primc" Homeier; Michael "Miguel" Behnke; Martin Motnik; Olli Pohl; Rene Greil; Dominik Palmer
- Website: eis-brecher.com

Eisbrecher (German for 'icebreaker'; pronounced [ˈaɪsbʁɛçɐ]) is a German Neue Deutsche Härte band. It was founded in 2003 by Alexander Wesselsky and Noel Pix after their departure from Megaherz, with the founders describing their music as "modern, electronic trip-rock". Noel Pix departed in 2024; the band currently consists primarily of Wesselsky (vocals) and Rupert Keplinger (bass), with live support from Jürgen Plangger (rhythm guitar), Marc "Micki" Richter (lead guitar), and Achim Färber (drums). In the United States and Canada, their record label is currently Metropolis Records.

The band's lyrics and slogans often include terms of ice and sailing, such as "Ahoi" ("Ahoy") and "Es wird kalt" ("It's getting cold"); vocalist Alexander Wesselsky often wears naval and military clothing during performances.

== History ==
=== Formation and early years (2003–2009) ===
After leaving Megaherz in 2003 due to creative differences, Wesselsky got together with Noel Pix, who composed the synths, guitars and programming for Megaherz's albums Kopfschuss and Himmelfahrt. In January 2004, the band released their self-titled debut album, Eisbrecher. The first 5,000 copies of the album included a blank CD with permission for purchasers to legally copy the music onto the blank. This was done as a protest against what the band felt was a "criminalization" of fans.

The band would release their second album Antikörper in October 2006. This album would become the band's debut album on the German Media Control Charts as it charted at No. 85. The band then toured with U.D.O. in December 2006.

In 2007, Eisbrecher performed at two major German music festivals, Wave-Gotik-Treffen ("Wave Gothic Meeting") and Summer Breeze Open Air.

In May 2008, live bass player Martin Motnik left the band, and was replaced by former Megaherz guitar player Olliver Pohl.

"Kann denn Liebe Sünde sein?" was released on 18 July 2008 in Germany as the first single to promote their third album, Sünde. It reached third place in the German Alternative charts. The album was released on 22 August 2008 in Germany and debuted on the Media Control Charts at 18th place. The band then went a tour between September 2008 and October 2009, playing in Germany, Austria, Russia, the Netherlands and Switzerland. Music videos were planned for "This Is Deutsch" and "Kann denn Liebe Sünde sein", but were cancelled in favor of new material and live shows.

In early March 2009, the band signed with a new American music label, Metropolis Records, due to Dancing Ferret Discs closing in late 2008.

=== Eiszeit and Die Hölle muss warten (2009–2013) ===
On 24 April 2009, Wesselsky and Noel Pix were guests on Radio Goethe to promote the American release of Sünde. Wesselsky mentioned that he would love to tour the United States "as soon as possible". He also mentioned that, with the popularity of Rammstein, Nena and Falco, he hopes that Eisbrecher can become the next big German act in the United States. He also talked about their upcoming fourth album; no title was named, but he stated that work was in progress. He described that the new album will be "very rockish, very pop and very heart breaking."

On 20 June 2009, Eisbrecher performed at their first major Austrian music festival, Nova Rock Festival; other bands, such as Killswitch Engage, Monster Magnet and In Extremo also performed on the same stage.

Eisbrecher's fourth studio album, Eiszeit, was released in mid-April 2010. The single "Eiszeit" was released on 19 March 2010 and became their debut single in the Media Control Charts, at No. 84. The album was released on 16 April 2010 and debuted in the Media Control Charts at No. 5, the Ö3 Austria Top 40 charts at No. 34, and the Swiss Music Charts at No. 76.

In August 2010, it was reported that Eisbrecher had signed with Sony Records and Columbia Records.

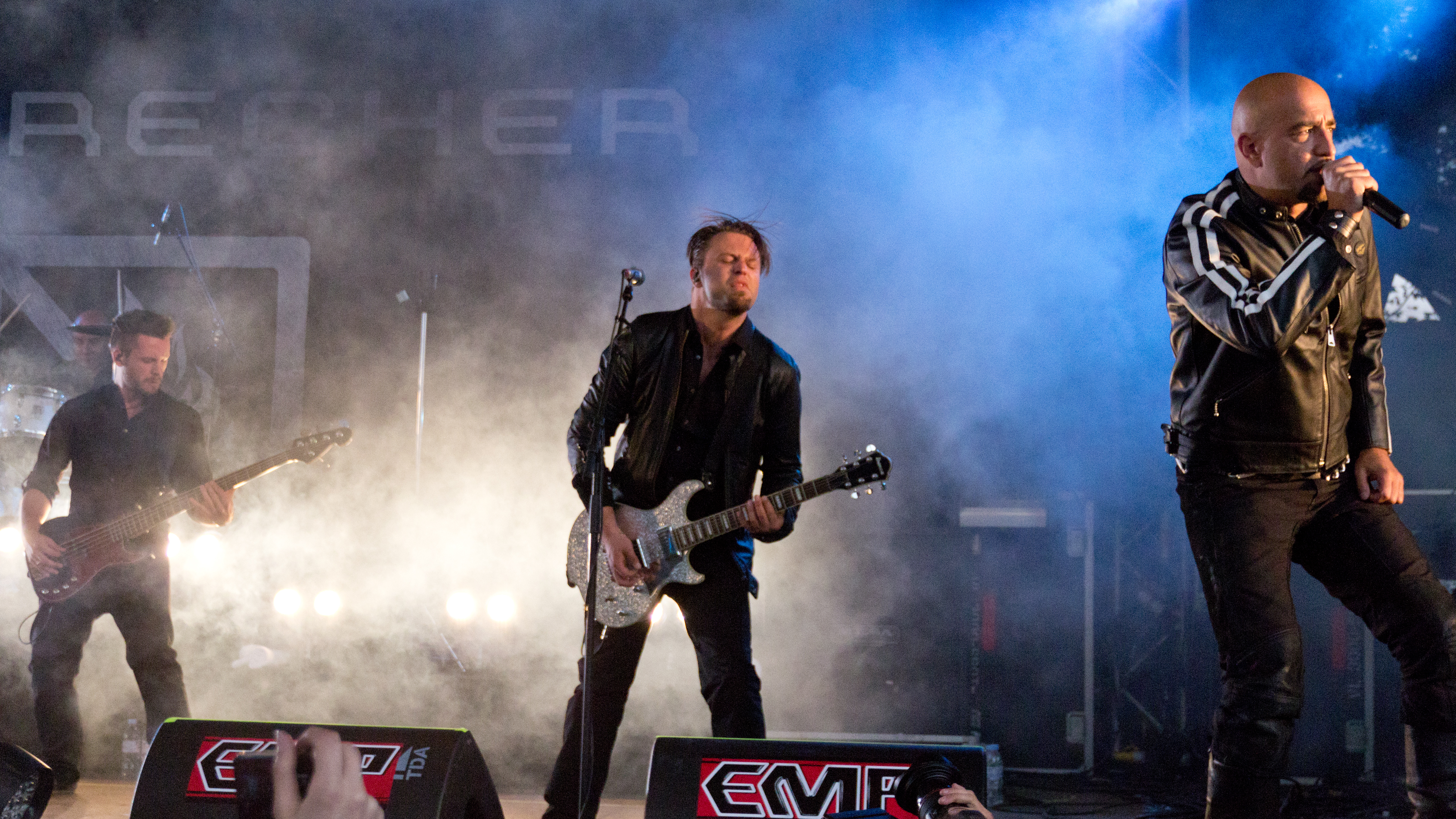
Eisbrecher in 2010

After the Summer Breeze Open Air festival, bassist Olli Pohl left the band. The band later found a new bass guitar player in Dominik Palmer.

In November 2010, Eisbrecher toured with Alice Cooper and Tarja Turunen during Cooper's "Theatre of Death Tour" of Germany. Eisbrecher's drummer Rene Greil was temporarily replaced during the tour by Sebastian Angrand, as Greil needed back surgery.

On 26 February 2011, it was announced in the Herzeleid.com forums that live drummer Rene Greil had left Eisbrecher for health reasons. Greil was replaced by Achim Färber.

Announced on 31 March 2011, it was reported that Eisbrecher will release a best of album titled Eiskalt due for release on 29 April 2011. However, Alexander Wesselsky stated that the album was made without the band's knowledge and that they did not choose any of the songs to appear on the compilation.

Eisbrecher appeared at the Nova Rock Festival in Austria on 11 June 2011, the same day Thirty Seconds to Mars, HammerFall, In Extremo and Linkin Park performed.

During the Zugspitze concert on 5 November 2011, Eisbrecher performed six new songs from their upcoming album titled Die Hölle muss warten.

The first single from the album, "Verrückt", was released on 20 January 2012. The album was released on 3 February 2012 and charted in Germany at No. 3, in Austria at No. 21, and Switzerland at No. 16. The second single, "Die Hölle muss warten", was released on 30 March 2012.

Eisbrecher played at many festivals between May and September 2012, including Mera Luna Festival, Amphi Festival, the Wave-Gotik-Treffen festival, and the Nova Rock Festival, among others. During May and December 2012, Eisbrecher supported German rock band Scorpions for their shows on 12 & 13 May and 15 & 17 December 2012 in Germany.

Die Hölle muss warten: Miststück Edition was released on 28 September 2012, featuring four new songs, including "Miststück 2012", a DVD with five live clips and all of the DHMW music videos, a tour documentary, and more.

On the band's official website on 21 March 2013, Rupert Keplinger was announced as the band's new bass player. The reason for Dominik Palmer's departure from the band was not mentioned. In August, Eisbrecher performed at Wacken Open Air, the largest metal festival in the world.

To celebrate the band's first 10 years, Eisbrecher went on a 10th anniversary tour in November and December. During the tour, the band released a single titled "10 Jahre Eisbrecher" on 29 November 2013.

=== Zehn Jahre Kalt and Schock (2014–2016) ===
On 12 February 2014, Eisbrecher announced on their official website that they have entered the studio to begin work on their next album. They mentioned that due to the recording of the new album for an early 2015 release, that they have had to limit their number of shows in 2014.

Announced via the band's official website on 6 March 2014, the band released a special album titled Zehn Jahre Kalt on 11 March 2014, available exclusively in the United States. The record was released via Metropolis Records.

The band announced on 13 October 2014, that their next album would be released on 16 January 2015. A month later, however, it was announced that the release date for Schock had been pushed back a week to 23 January 2015.

The first single from Schock, "Zwischen uns", became available via download on 28 November 2014. The second single, "1000 Narben/Zwischen uns", was released on 9 January 2015. "Rot wie die Liebe" was released as the third single on 12 June 2015. A fourth single, "Volle Kraft voraus!", became available during the Volle Kraft voraus! 2016 Tour in March.

Revealed via the band's website on 9 June 2015, their upcoming DVD, which was filmed at Circus Krone, will be released as a live CD and DVD in September 2015. The live CD/DVD was later revealed to be titled Schock Live and will have a release date of 25 September 2015. Schock Live was released on 25 September 2015 and charted in the Top 10 DVD charts in both Austria and Switzerland, at No. 7.

Eisbrecher's album Die Hölle muss warten achieved Gold status after selling more than 100,000 copies across Germany as of 23 January 2016.

Schock earned the band their second Gold album as of 11 April 2016.

=== Sturmfahrt and Ewiges Eis (2016–2019) ===
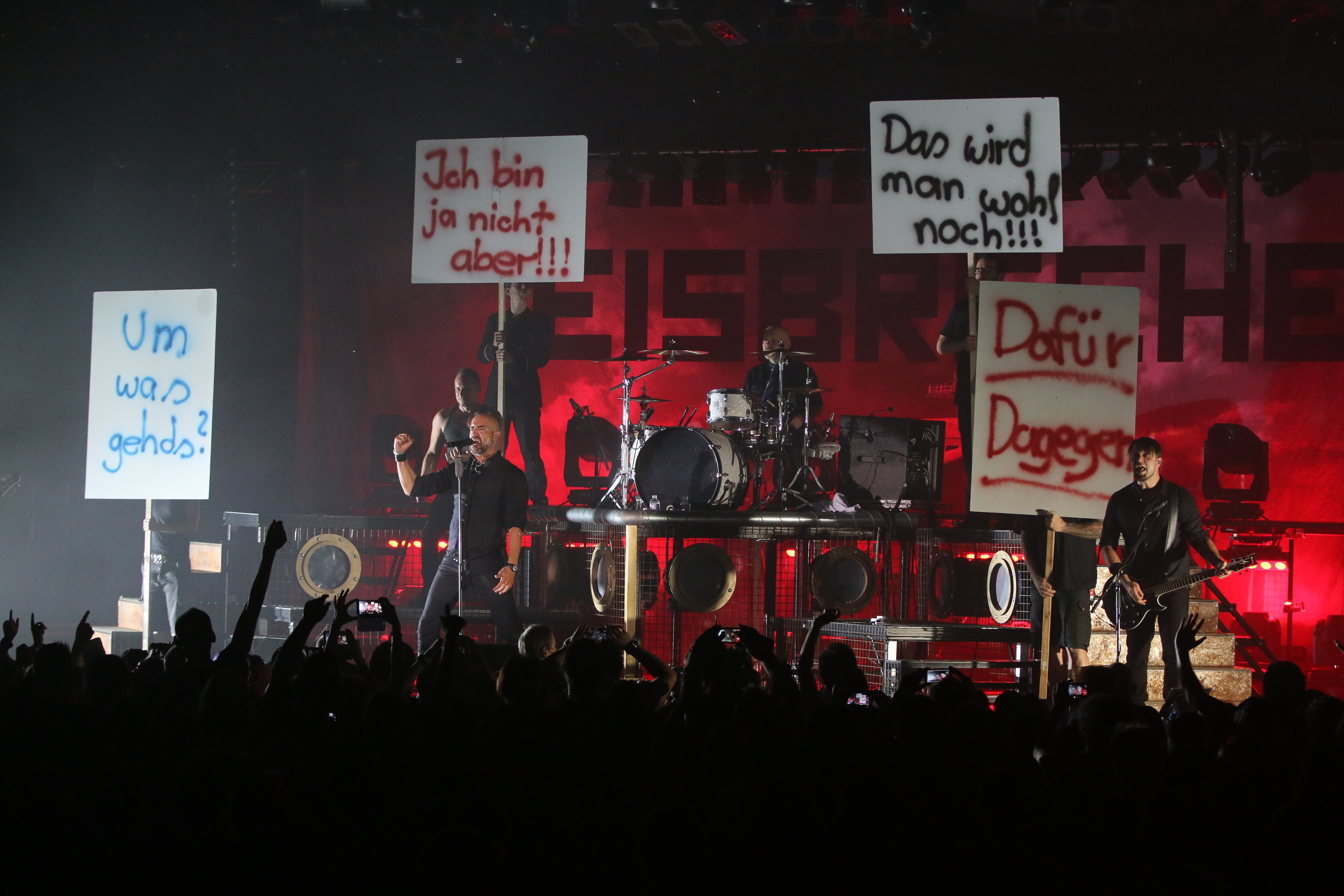
Zelt-Musik-Festival 2016 in Freiburg, Germany

Announced on 5 October 2016 via Eisbrecher's Facebook page, they released their seventh studio album, Sturmfahrt, in the summer of 2017.

The band headlined the first edition of the "Volle Kraft voraus Festival" at the Ratiopharm Arena on 8 July, organized by the band themselves. The festival featured other bands such as Combichrist, Lord of the Lost, Unzucht, Welle:Erdball, and And Then She Came.

Sturmfahrt was released on 18 August 2017 and became the band's first album to top the German charts at No. 1. The album would also chart in the top 10 of the Swiss and Austrian charts at No. 8 and No. 10, respectively. The band went on tour through Europe in late September and October 2017 to promote the album.

Eisbrecher headlined the second edition of the "Volle Kraft voraus Festival" in 2018. The festival was held in September as opposed to the first edition being held in July. Bands that played at the second festival were Oomph!, Stahlmann, Zeromancer, Die Krupps, and Schöngeist.

Sturmfahrt was nominated for "Best Rock National" at the 2018 Echo Awards held on 12 April 2018.

Ewiges Eis, a best-of album, was released on 5 October 2018 and charted at No. 6 on the German charts. The band embarked on a short four-date tour in May 2019 to promote the album.

=== Schicksalsmelodien, Liebe Macht Monster and Noel Pix's departure (2019–2024) ===
Eisbrecher entered the studio in early 2019 to begin production on their next album, targeted for an early 2020 release.

The band continued playing shows throughout 2019, consisting mostly of festivals, including their own "Volle Kraft voraus Festival" in September. The third edition of the festival was headlined by the band and featured And One, Mono Inc., Diary of Dreams, A Life Divided, and Heldmaschine.

Eisbrecher planned their first European tour, "Eis Over Europe", for May 2020, featuring fellow German Neue Deutsche Härte band Maerzfeld. However, due to the COVID-19 pandemic, the tour was postponed to March 2021.

The band released a cover of Powerwolf's song "Stossgebet" on 21 May 2020. It would later be accompanied by a music video which was released on 30 May 2020.

On 3 July 2020, Eisbrecher released a video from the studio onto their YouTube channel, confirming an upcoming new album in October 2020 and a second new album in March 2021. October's album is a compilation of covers entitled Schicksalsmelodien ("Melodies of Destiny"), released on 23 October 2020. The first single from the album, "Skandal im Sperrbezirk", was released on 18 September 2020. A second single, "Anna (Lassmichrein Lassmichraus)" ("Anna let-me-in let-me-out"), was released on 7 October 2020.

Liebe Macht Monster was announced via the band's Facebook page on 15 January to be the next studio album due for release on 12 March 2021. The first single, "FAKK", was released on 15 January.

Eisrecher announced on their website on 1 March 2022 that the "Eis Over Europe" tour would be further postponed to late April 2023, in order for the date to line up with the band's 20th anniversary.

On 17 February 2024, Alexx Wesselsky announced in an interview with Augsburger Allgemeine that co-founder and lead guitarist Jochen "Noel Pix" Seibert had departed Eisbrecher. He was replaced by Marc "Micki" Richter, who is the lead guitarist of Wesselsky's solo project "Die Herren Wesselsky" and who also plays guitar for the bands Atrocity and Leaves' Eyes. The band later confirmed the news in an official statement on Instagram on 20 February.

=== Kaltfront (2024–present) ===
On 21 November 2024, the band released a cover song, "Tränen lügen nicht", which was accompanied by a music video. On 29 November, they released the first single, "Everything Is Wunderbar", from their forthcoming ninth studio album Kaltfront, followed by a music video on 30 November.

Kaltfront was released on 14 March 2025, containing 15 tracks.

== Members ==
Eisbrecher, line-up at Rockharz Open Air 2018

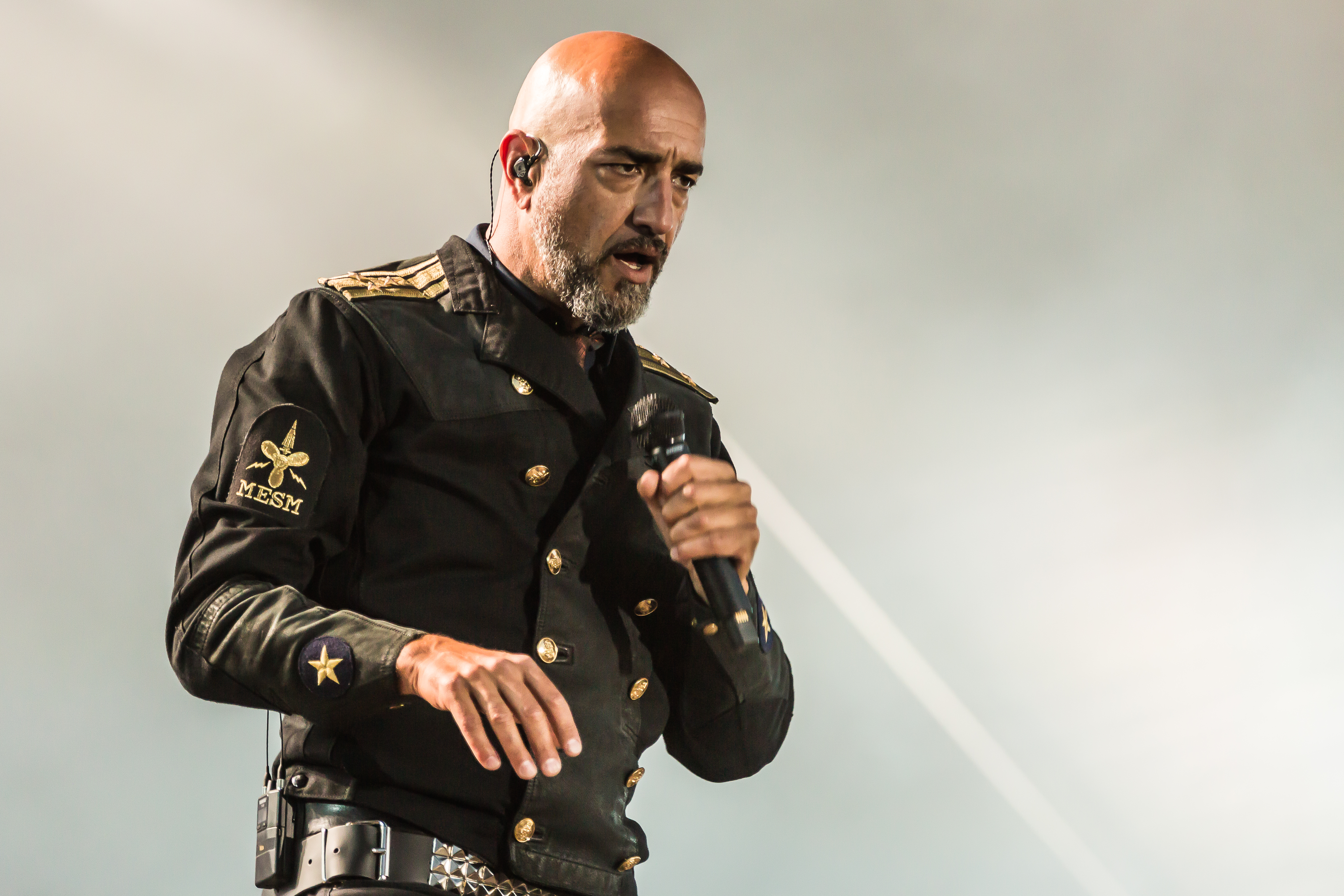
Alexander "Alexx" Wesselsky

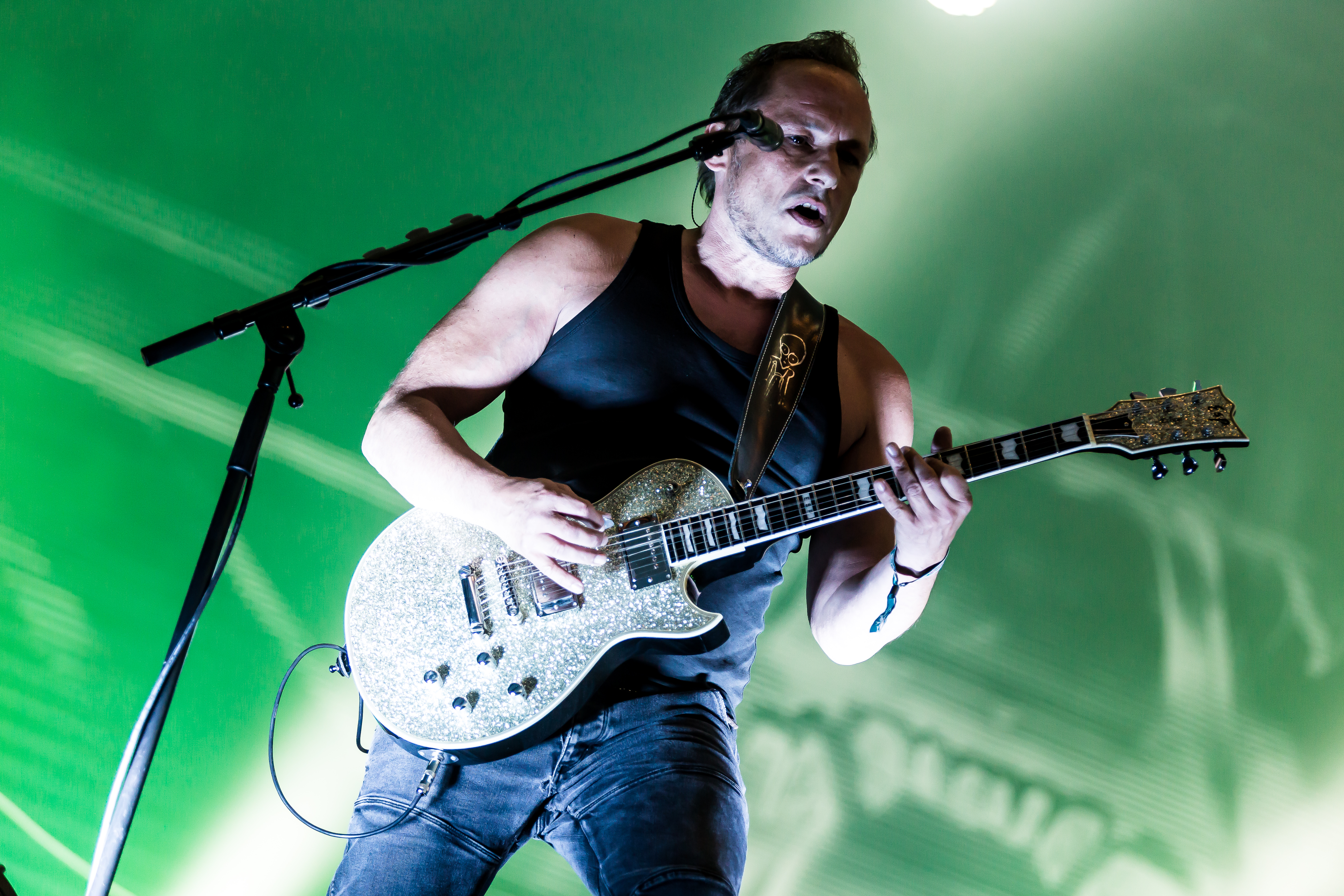
Jochen "Noel Pix" Seibert

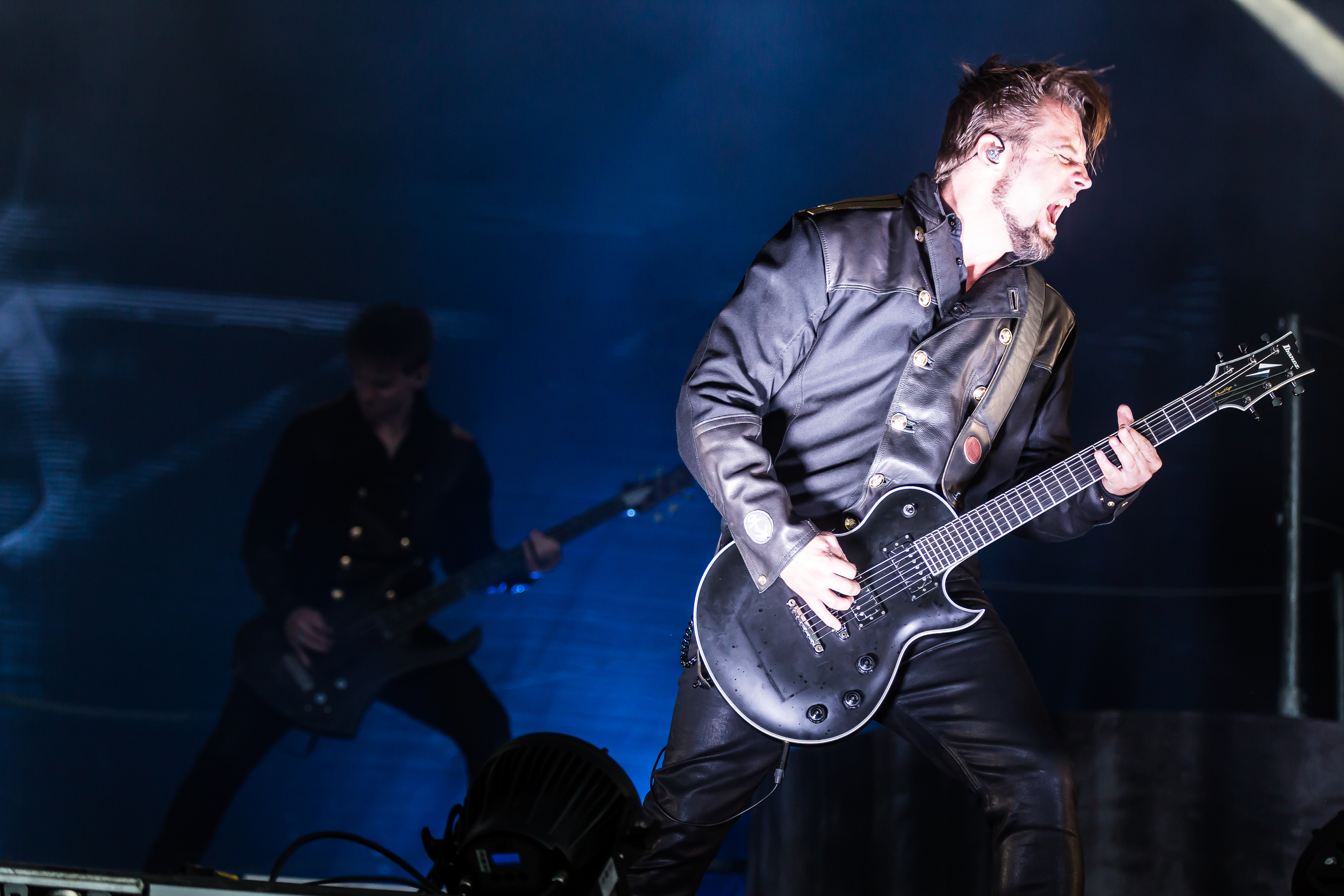
Jürgen Plangger

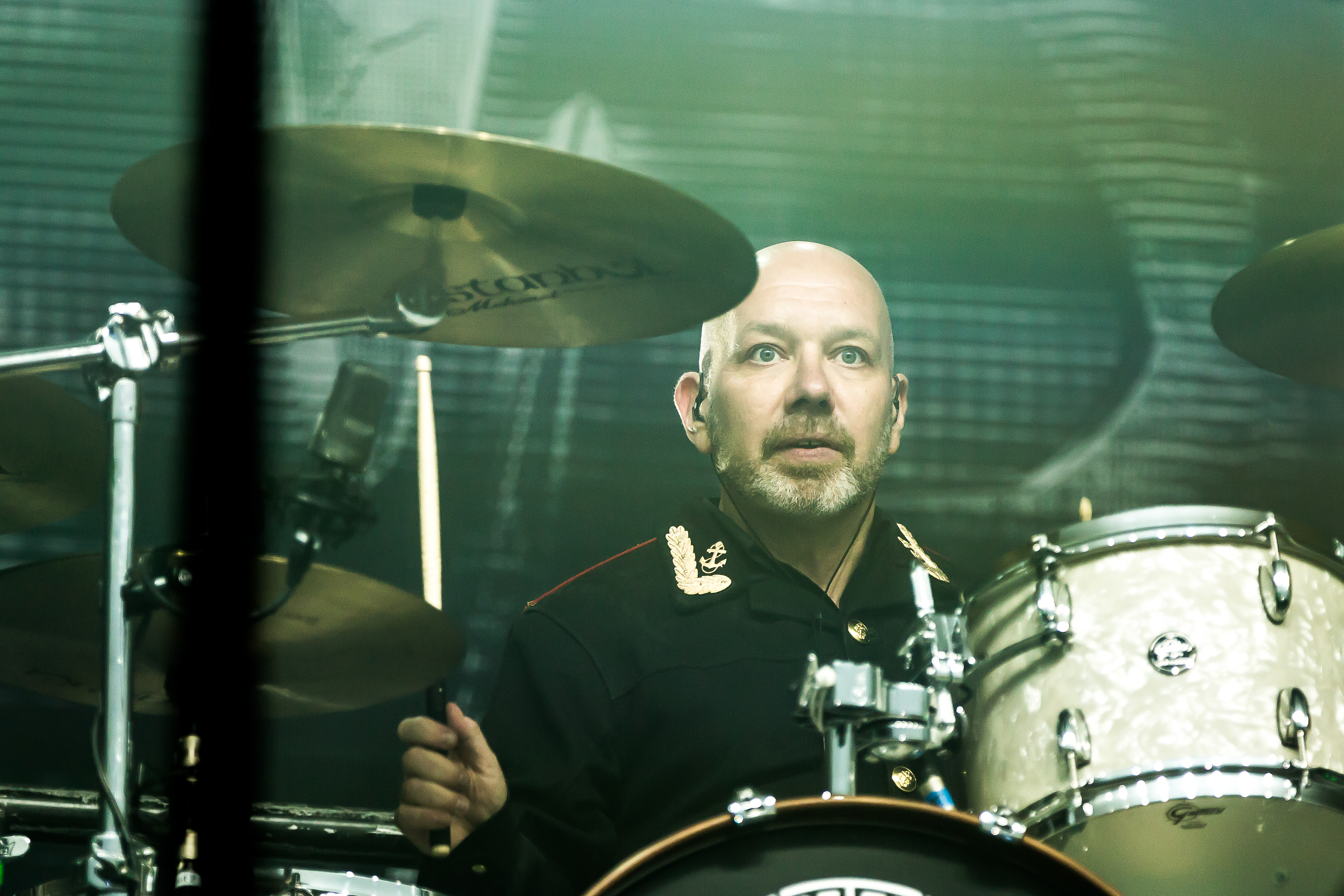
Achim Färber

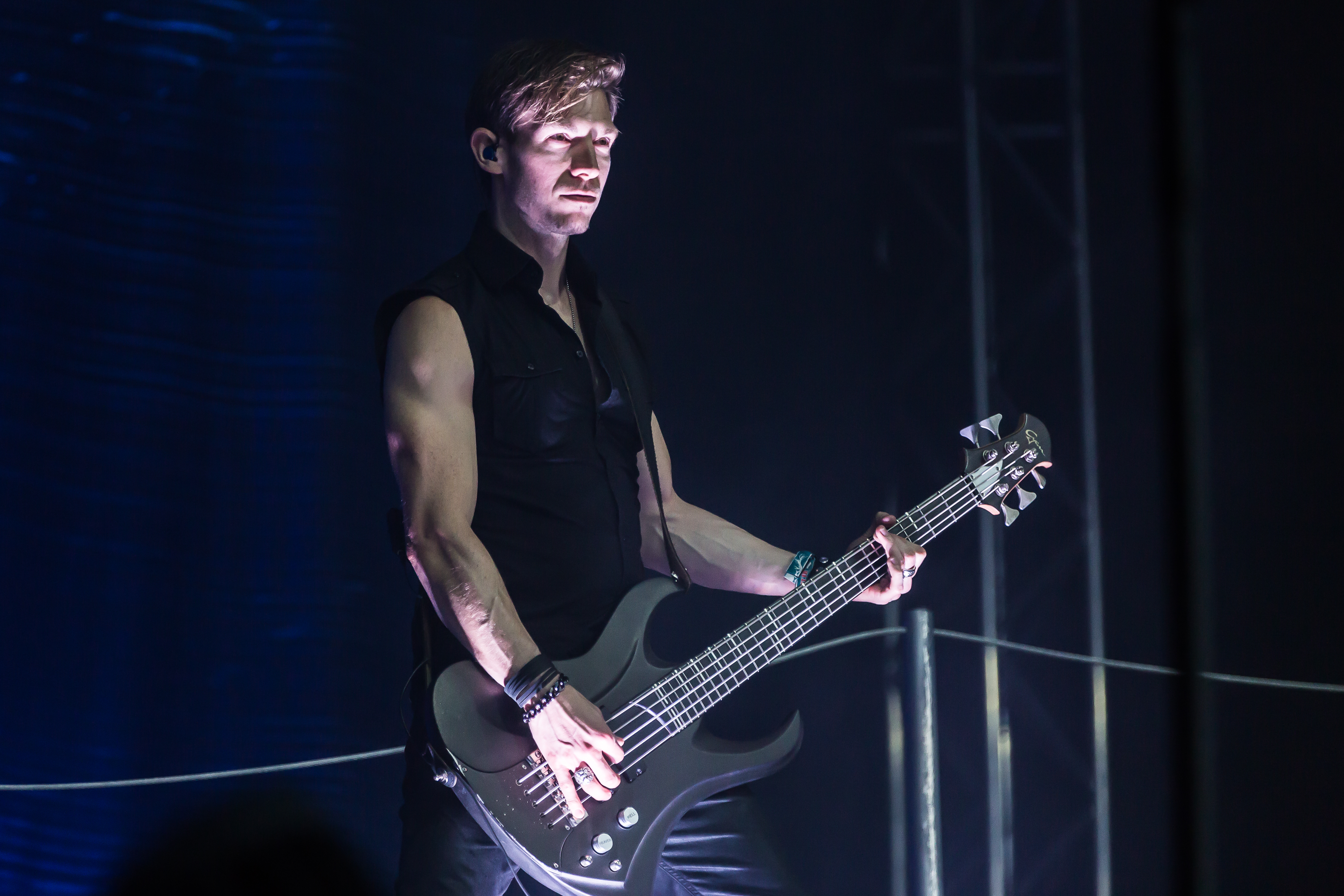
Rupert Keplinger

=== Current members ===
- Alexx Wesselsky – lead vocals (2003–present)
- Jürgen Plangger – rhythm guitar, backing vocals (2007–present)
- Maximilian Schauer – keyboards, programming (live and session: 2003–2007, session only: 2008–present)
- Achim Färber – drums (2011–present)
- Rupert Keplinger – bass (2013–present)
- Marc 'Micki' Richter – lead guitar, backing vocals (2024–present)

=== Former members ===
- Noel Pix – lead guitar, keyboards, programming, backing vocals, production (2003–2024)

=== Former live members ===
- Rene Greil – drums (2003–2011)
- Felix "Primc" Homeier – rhythm guitar (2003–2007)
- Michael 'Miguel' Behnke – bass (2003–2007)
- Martin Motnik – bass (2007–2008)
- Olli Pohl – bass (2008–2010, 2015)
- Sébastien Angrand – drums (2010; substitute)
- Dominik Palmer – bass (2010–2013)

Timeline

== Awards and nominations ==
Echo Awards

- 2018 – Rock national – Sturmfahrt (nominated)

== Discography ==
=== Albums ===
Year	Title	Chart positions			Certifications (sales thresholds)
Year	Title	GER	AUT	SWI	Certifications (sales thresholds)
2004	Eisbrecher	—	—	—	
2006	Antikörper	85	—	—	
2008	Sünde	18	—	—	
2010	Eiszeit	5	34	76	
2012	Die Hölle muss warten	3	21	16	BVMI: Gold
2015	Schock	2	11	16	BVMI: Gold
2017	Sturmfahrt	1	10	8	
2021	Liebe Macht Monster	1	4	11	
2025	Kaltfront°!	2	7	17	

=== DVDs ===
- 2015: Schock Live (No. 7 in Switzerland, No. 7 in Austria)

=== Other CDs ===
- 2011: Eiskalt (compilation album; No. 69 in Germany)
- 2014: 10 Jahre Kalt (US special release)
- 2015: Schock Live (live album)
- 2016: Volle Kraft voraus EP
- 2018: Ewiges Eis – 15 Jahre Eisbrecher (best-of album; No. 6 in Germany)
- 2020: Schicksalsmelodien (cover album)
- 2023: Es bleibt Kalt! – 2003-2023 (best-of album)

=== Singles ===
Year	Title	Peak chart positions		Album
Year	Title	DAC	GER	Album
2003	"Mein Blut"	-	-	Eisbrecher
2003	"Fanatica"	-	-	Eisbrecher
2006	"Leider"	9	-	Antikörper
2006	"Vergissmeinnicht"	15	-	Antikörper
2008	"Kann denn Liebe Sünde sein?"	3	-	Sünde
2010	"Eiszeit"	-	84	Eiszeit
2012	"Verrückt"	1	43	Die Hölle muss warten
2012	"Die Hölle muss warten"	-	-	Die Hölle muss warten
2012	"Miststück 2012"	13	-	Die Hölle muss warten
2012	"Prototyp"	1	-	Die Hölle muss warten
2013	"10 Jahre Eisbrecher"	-	-	Non-album release
2014	"Zwischen uns"	1	-	Schock
2015	"1000 Narben"	2	-	Schock
2015	"Rot wie die Liebe"	12	-	Schock
2016	"Volle Kraft voraus"	-	-	Schock
2017	"Was ist hier los?"	2	-	Sturmfahrt
2017	"In einem Boot"	11	-	Sturmfahrt
2018	"Das Gesetz"	3	-	Sturmfahrt
2018	"Menschenfresser"	6	-	Ewiges Eis – 15 Jahre Eisbrecher
2020	"Stossgebet"	-	-	Schicksalsmelodien
2020	"Skandal im Sperrbezirk"	-	-	Schicksalsmelodien
2020	"Anna (Lassmichrein Lassmichraus)"	-	-	Schicksalsmelodien
2021	"FAKK"	-	-	Liebe Macht Monster
2021	"Es lohnt sich nicht ein Mensch zu sein"	-	-	Liebe Macht Monster
2021	"Im Guten Im Bösen"	-	-	Liebe Macht Monster
2024	"Tränen lügen nicht"	-	-	Kaltfront
2024	"Everything is Wunderbar"	-	-	Kaltfront
2025	Kaltfront	-	-	Kaltfront
2025	Auf die Zunge (feat. Schattenmann)	-	-	Kaltfront

=== Music videos ===
- 2003: "Schwarze Witwe" (narrative)
- 2005: "Herz steht still" (concert footage)
- 2006: "Willkommen im Nichts" (tour and concert footage)
- 2006: "Vergissmeinnicht" (narrative)
- 2010: "Eiszeit" (concert footage)
- 2011: "Verrückt" (narrative and performance)
- 2012: "Die Hölle muss warten" (narrative and performance)
- 2012: "Miststück 2012" (narrative and performance)
- 2014: "Zwischen uns" (narrative and performance)
- 2015: "Rot wie die Liebe" (narrative and concert footage)
- 2015: "Volle Kraft voraus" (concert footage)
- 2017: "Was ist hier los?" (narrative)
- 2018: "Das Gesetz" (narrative/lyric)
- 2020: "Stossgebet" (narrative)
- 2020: "Skandal im Sperrbezirk" (narrative and performance)
- 2020: "Out of the Dark" (narrative)
- 2021: "FAKK" (performance)
- 2021: "Im Guten Im Bösen" (narrative and performance)
- 2021: "Himmel" (narrative)
- 2024: "Tränen lügen nicht" (narrative)
- 2024: "Everything Is Wunderbar" (narrative and performance)
- 2025: "Auf die Zunge (feat. Schattenmann)" (narrative and performance)
- 2025: "Waffen Waffen Waffen" (Narrative)
- 2026: "Zeitgeist (feat. Joachim Witt)" (Concert/Performance)

=== Other appearances ===
- 2004: Asleep by Dawn magazine issue #2 companion CD – song "Schwarze Witwe"
- 2005: Nachtwelten – song "Mein Blut"
- 2005: Gothic Spirits – songs "Eisbrecher" and "Herz steht still"
- 2007: Melodic Metal Dreams for Christmas – song "Vergissmeinnicht"
- 2008: All for Metal – song "Vergissmeinnicht"
- 2009: Metropolis: Rebirth 2.0 – song "Schwarze Witwe (Remix 2009)"
- 2009: All for Metal, II – song "Heilig"
- 2010: Amphi Festival 2009 – live DVD
- 2010: Cold Hands Seduction Vol. 105 – song "Heilig (Live)"
- 2010: Krieg im Kopf – song "Böse Mädchen"
- 2010: European Metal Assault – song "Dornentanz"
- 2010: Rock Mundial – song "Kann denn Liebe Sünde sein?"
- 2014: Schattenreich Vol. 6 – song "Verrückt"
