= CO2 (album) =

CO_{2}

Studio album by Stahlmann
- Released: 28 August 2015
- Genre: Neue Deutsche Härte
- Length: 37:28
- Label: AFM Records

Stahlmann chronology
| Adamant (2013) | CO_{2} (2015) | Bastard (2017) |

Singles from CO_{2}
- 1. "Plasma" Released: 24 July 2015

CO_{2} is the fourth studio album by German rock band Stahlmann, released in 2015.

The album reached number 22 on the Official German Charts in September 2015.

== Track listing ==
| No. | Title | English translation | Length |
|---|---|---|---|
| 1. | "Feindflug" | Enemy Flight | 3:31 |
| 2. | "Plasma" | Plasma | 3:40 |
| 3. | "Deutschland tanzt" | Germany is Dancing | 3:16 |
| 4. | "Die Klinge" | The Blade | 4:57 |
| 5. | "Sadist" | Sadist | 3:57 |
| 6. | "Friss mich" | Eat Me | 3:01 |
| 7. | "Spiegelbild" | Mirror Image | 4:37 |
| 8. | "Wenn Engel tanzen" | When Angels Dance | 3:15 |
| 9. | "Der letzte Tag" | The Last Day | 3:14 |
| 10. | "Nimm meine Hand" | Take My Hand | 4:00 |
| Total length: | | | 37:28 |
