= Sünde =

2008 studio album by Eisbrecher

Studio album by Eisbrecher
- Released: 22 August 2008 (Germany); 26 August 2008 (US); 10 March 2009 (US re-release)
- Recorded: 2008
- Genre: Industrial metal, Neue Deutsche Härte
- Length: 55:58 (standard edition); 70:12 (limited edition)
- Label: AFM; Metropolis
- Producer: Noel Pix

Eisbrecher chronology
Antikörper (2006)	Sünde (2008)	Eiszeit (2010)

Singles from Sünde
- 1. "Kann denn Liebe Sünde sein?" Released: 18 July 2008

Professional ratings
Review scores
Source	Rating
Terrorizer	(Nov 2008)

Sünde (German for "sin") is the third studio album by German Neue Deutsche Härte band Eisbrecher, released on 22 August 2008 in Germany and on 26 August in the United States. The limited edition comes as a digipak and includes three bonus tracks (one new song and two remixes).

== Track listing ==
No.	Title	English translation	Length
1.	"Kann denn Liebe Sünde sein?"	Can Love Be a Sin?	4:50
2.	"Alkohol"	Alcohol	4:04
3.	"Komm süßer Tod"	Come Sweet Death	4:36
4.	"Heilig"	Holy	4:46
5.	"Verdammt sind" (instrumental)	Are Damned	1:43
6.	"Die durch die Hölle gehen"	Those Going Through Hell	3:54
7.	"Herzdieb"	Heart Thief	4:27
8.	"1000 Flammen"	1000 Flames	4:13
9.	"This is Deutsch"	This Is German	4:25
10.	"Zu sterben"	To Die	5:19
11.	"Mehr Licht"	More Light	4:30
12.	"Kuss" (instrumental)	Kiss	4:21
13.	"Blut und Tränen"	Blood and Tears	5:06
14.	"This is Deutsch" (SITD remix)		4:42
15.	"Alkohol" (Rotersand remix)		5:08
16.	"Kann denn Liebe Sünde sein?" (SITD remix)		4:04
Total length:			70:12

Tracks 13, 15 and 16 are only on limited and American re-issues.

== Personnel ==
- Alexander Wesselsky – vocals
- Noel Pix – instruments
- Max Schauer – keyboards and programming, tracks 5, 8 and 13; additional programming on tracks 2 and 3
- Eric Damköhler – guitars on track 9; additional guitars on tracks 1 and 6

== Charts ==
- European Top 100 Albums charts - #62
- Media Control Charts - #18
- Deutsche Alternative Charts - #1
