= Eisbrecher (Eisbrecher album) =

2004 studio album by Eisbrecher

Studio album by Eisbrecher
- Released: 26 January 2004
- Recorded: TTM Studio, Munich, Germany
- Genres: Industrial metal, Neue Deutsche Härte
- Length: 61:22
- Labels: ZYX; Dancing Ferret Discs
- Producers: Eisbrecher, Noel Pix (exec.), M. Smart (exec.), Andi List (exec.)

Eisbrecher chronology
Eisbrecher (2004)	Antikörper (2006)

Singles from Eisbrecher
- 1. "Mein Blut" Released: 16 June 2003; 2. "Fanatica" Released: 22 September 2003

Eisbrecher is the debut studio album by German Neue Deutsche Härte band Eisbrecher, released on 26 January 2004 via ZYX Music in Europe and Dancing Ferret Discs Inc. in the US. Original shipments of the CD came packaged with a region-free multimedia DVD and two pressed, blank CDs intended to show the band's position on copyright infringement. The album hit the Deutsche Alternative Charts at No. 13.

== Track listing ==
No.	Title	English translation	Length
1.	"Polarstern"	Polaris	2:32
2.	"Herz steht still"	Heart Stands Silent	3:55
3.	"Willkommen im Nichts"	Welcome to Nothing	4:08
4.	"Schwarze Witwe"	Black Widow	3:52
5.	"Ruhe"	Peace	0:57
6.	"Angst?"	Fear?	4:17
7.	"Fanatica"		3:22
8.	"Taub-stumm-blind"	Deaf – Dumb – Blind	5:14
9.	"Dornentanz"	Thorn Dance	4:14
10.	"Hoffnung"	Hope	2:17
11.	"Eisbrecher"	Icebreaker	4:04
12.	"Frage"	Question	4:20
13.	"Zeichen der Venus"	Sign of the Venus	4:09
14.	"Mein Blut"	My Blood	4:24
15.	"Sakrileg 11"	Sacrilege 11	4:22
16.	"Fanatica" (Club Mix)		5:15
Total length:			61:22

== Personnel ==
- Alexander Wesselsky – vocals
- Noel Pix – instruments
- M. Smart – co-wrote various songs
