= Die Hölle muss warten =

2012 studio album by Eisbrecher

Studio album by Eisbrecher
- Released: 6 February 2012
- Recorded: 2011
- Genres: Neue Deutsche Härte, industrial metal
- Length: 48:59
- Language: German
- Labels: Sony BMG, Metropolis
- Producers: Noel Pix, Henning Verlage

Eisbrecher chronology
Eiszeit (2010)	Die Hölle muss warten (2012)	Schock (2015)

Singles from Die Hölle muss warten
- 1. "Verrückt" Released: 23 January 2012; 2. "Die Hölle muss warten" Released: 2 April 2012

Die Hölle muss warten (German for "Hell Must Wait") is the fifth studio album by German Neue Deutsche Härte band Eisbrecher. It was released in 2012 by Metropolis Records. Die Hölle muss warten has been certified gold after selling more than 100,000 copies across Germany as of January 2016.

== Track listing ==
No.	Title	English translation	Length
1.	"Tanz mit mir"	Dance with Me	3:17
2.	"Augen unter Null"	Eyes Below Zero	4:01
3.	"Die Hölle muss warten"	Hell Must Wait	4:02
4.	"Verrückt"	Crazy	3:21
5.	"Herz aus Eis"	Heart of Ice	3:55
6.	"Prototyp"	Prototype	3:22
7.	"Ein Leben lang unsterblich"	Life Long Immortality	3:42
8.	"Abgrund"	Abyss	4:19
9.	"In meinem Raum"	In My Room	3:12
10.	"Keine Liebe"	No Love	3:58
11.	"Exzess Express"	Excess Express	3:25
12.	"Rette mich"	Rescue Me	3:56
13.	"Atem"	Breath	4:20
Total length:			48:59

Miststück 2012 edition
No.	Title	English translation	Length
1.	"Treiben"	Drifting	4:22
2.	"Böser Traum"	Bad Dream	4:07
3.	"Metall"	Metal	3:42
4.	"Miststück 2012"	Bitch 2012	3:22
5.	"Wenn Zeit die Wunden heilt"	If Time Heals Wounds	3:24
6.	"Zu Leben"	To Live	3:43
7.	"Zeit"	Time	4:03

Miststück 2012 edition (DVD)
No.	Title	English translation	Length
1.	"Abfahrt ist Abfahrt (Tourdoku)"	Departure Is Departure (Tour Documentation)	41:00
2.	"Exzess Express Live at Amphi Festival 2012"	Excess Express Live at Amphi Festival 2012
3.	"Verrückt Live at Amphi Festival 2012"	Crazy Live at Amphi Festival 2012
4.	"Prototyp Live at Amphi Festival 2012"	Prototype Live at Amphi Festival 2012
5.	"This is Deutsch Live at Amphi Festival 2012"	This is German Live at Amphi Festival 2012
6.	"Die Hölle muss warten Live at Amphi Festival 2012"	Hell Must Wait Live at Amphi Festival 2012
7.	"Die Hölle muss warten (Fancam)"	Hell Must Wait (Fan Cam)
8.	"Verrückt (Music Video)"	Crazy (Music Video)
9.	"Die Hölle muss warten (Music Video)"	Hell Must Wait (Music Video)
10.	"Miststück 2012 (Music Video)"	Bitch 2012 (Music Video)

2016 Volle Kraft voraus Tour Gold Edition
No.	Title	English Translation	Length
1.	"Wir sind Gold"	We Are Gold

== Charts ==
Chart	Peak position
German Media Control Charts	3
German Top 100 Jahrecharts	92
Austria Top 40	21
Switzerland	16
