= Antikörper =

2006 studio album by Eisbrecher

Studio album by Eisbrecher
- Released: 20 October 2006
- Genre: Industrial metal, Neue Deutsche Härte
- Length: 56:43
- Label: AFM Records/Dancing Ferret Discs
- Producer: Noel Pix

Eisbrecher chronology
Eisbrecher (2004)	Antikörper (2006)	Sünde (2008)

Singles from Antikörper
- 1. "Leider" Released: 14 July 2006; 2. "Vergissmeinnicht" Released: 25 August 2006

Antikörper (German for Antibody) is the second studio album by German Neue Deutsche Härte band Eisbrecher, released on 20 October 2006. It debuted on the Media Control Charts at number 85 and on the Deutsche Alternative Charts at number 10.

== Track listing ==
No.	Title	English translation	Length
1.	"Der Anfang"	The Beginning	2:35
2.	"Adrenalin"	Adrenaline	4:02
3.	"Leider"	Unfortunately	4:08
4.	"Antikörper"	Antibody	4:15
5.	"Entlassen"	Released	4:28
6.	"Ohne dich"	Without You	4:36
7.	"Phosphor"	Phosphorus	3:52
8.	"Kein Mitleid"	No Sympathy	5:30
9.	"Kinder der Nacht"	Children of the Night	4:18
10.	"Vergissmeinnicht"	Forget-me-not	3:54
11.	"Freisturz"	Free Fall	4:57
12.	"Wie tief?"	How Deep?	4:24
13.	"Das Ende"	The End	1:49
14.	"Eiskalt erwischt" (bonus track)	Caught Icecold	3:46
15.	"Vergissmeinnicht" (video; bonus track)		4:05
Total length:			56:43

Track 14 is only available on the limited edition and US releases. The "Vergissmeinnicht" video is only available on the limited edition.

== Personnel ==
- Alexander Wesselsky – vocals
- Noel Pix – instruments
- Max Schauer – keyboards, tracks 1 and 13, additional programming on tracks 2, 4, 7, 10, 12 and 14
- Eric Damköhler – additional guitars on tracks 2–5, 7, 12 and 14
- M. Smart – co-wrote various songs
