= Eiszeit (album) =

2010 studio album by Eisbrecher

Studio album by Eisbrecher
- Released: 16 April 2010
- Recorded: 2009–2010
- Genre: Industrial metal, Neue Deutsche Härte
- Length: 37:58 (standard edition); 52:28 (limited edition); 50:52 (US edition)
- Language: German and English
- Label: AFM, Metropolis
- Producer: Noel Pix, Henning Verlage

Eisbrecher chronology
Sünde (2008)	Eiszeit (2010)	Die Hölle muss warten (2012)

Singles from Eiszeit
- 1. "Eiszeit" Released: 19 March 2010

Eiszeit (German for "Ice age") is the fourth studio album by German Neue Deutsche Härte band Eisbrecher. It was released on 16 April 2010 in Germany and on 8 June 2010 in the United States.

== Release ==
The album is available in three editions – a standard edition with ten songs, a deluxe edition with a bonus track and two remixes, and a limited edition with the bonus tracks from the deluxe edition and footage from a 2009 live performance in Stuttgart. The US release features the same tracks as the deluxe edition but has a different remix of the song "Amok".

== Track listing ==
No.	Title	Lyrics	Music	English translation	Length
1.	"Böse Mädchen"	Wesselsky/Pix	Pix/Plangger	Bad Girls	3:55
2.	"Eiszeit"	Verlage/Barwig	Verlage/Barwig	Ice Age	3:40
3.	"Bombe"	Wesselsky/Pix	Pix/Max.S	Bomb	3:11
4.	"Gothkiller" (feat. Rob Vitacca)	Pix/Vitacca	Pix		3:50
5.	"Die Engel"	Wesselsky	Pix	The Angels	3:36
6.	"Segne deinen Schmerz"	Wesselsky/Pix/Verlage/Barwig	Pix/Mas.S	Bless Your Pain	4:19
7.	"Amok"	Wesselsky/Pix	Pix/Max.S		3:55
8.	"Dein Weg"	Wesselsky	Pix	Your Way	3:46
9.	"Supermodel"	Wesselsky	Pix		3:35
10.	"Der Hauch des Lebens"	Wesselsky/Pix	Pix/Max.S	The Breath of Life	4:09

=== Bonus tracks ===
No.	Title	Lyrics	Music	English translation	Length
1.	"Kein Wunder"	Wesselsky/Pix	Pix/Max.S	No Miracle	4:51
2.	"Amok (Renegade of Noise Remix)"	Wesselsky/Pix	Pix/Max.S		5:42
3.	"Schwarze Witwe (TLP Remix)"	Wesselsky	Seibert	Black Widow (TLP Remix)	3:52

=== Bonus DVD ===
No.	Title	English translation	Length
1.	"Vergissmeinnicht – Live"	Forget-me-not	3:59
2.	"Leider – Live"	Regrettably	4:10
3.	"Heilig – Live"	Saint	5:01

== Personnel ==
- Alexander Wesselsky – vocals
- Noel Pix – all instruments and production
- Henning Verlage – keyboards on "Eiszeit"; additional programing on tracks 1, 5, 8 and 10; additional guitars on tracks 2 and 5
- Max Schauer – additional keyboards and programing on tracks 3, 6, 7, 10 and 11; additional guitar on "Segne deinen Schmerz"

== Charts ==
- Germany – #5
- Austria – #34
- Switzerland – #76
- European Top 100 – #25
