= Sturmfahrt =

2017 studio album by Eisbrecher

Studio album by Eisbrecher
- Released: 18 August 2017
- Recorded: 2016–2017
- Genre: Neue Deutsche Härte, industrial metal
- Length: 57:17
- Label: Sony, Metropolis

Eisbrecher chronology
Schock (2015)	Sturmfahrt (2017)	Schicksalsmelodien (2020)

Singles from Sturmfahrt
- 1. "Was ist hier los?" Released: 23 June 2017; 2. "In einem Boot" Released: 11 August 2017; 3. "Das Gesetz" Released: 8 June 2018

Sturmfahrt (German pronunciation: [ˈʃtʊʁmfaːɐ̯t]; German for Stormy voyage) is the seventh studio album by German Neue Deutsche Härte band Eisbrecher, released in 2017 by Metropolis Records.

== Track listing ==
No.	Title	English translation	Length
1.	"Was ist hier los?"	What is going on here?	3:33
2.	"Besser"	Better	4:19
3.	"Sturmfahrt"	Stormy voyage	3:34
4.	"In einem Boot"	On a submarine	4:56
5.	"Automat"	Automaton	3:44
6.	"Eisbär" (Grauzone cover)	Polar bear	3:59
7.	"Der Wahnsinn"	Madness	3:28
8.	"Herz auf"	Open heart	3:35
9.	"Krieger"	Warriors	3:30
10.	"Das Gesetz"	The Law	3:43
11.	"Wo geht der Teufel hin"	Where does the Devil go?	3:43
12.	"Wir sind 'Rock'n'Roll'"	We are 'Rock'n'Roll'	3:54
13.	"D-Zug"	Express train	3:48
14.	"Das Leben wartet nicht"	Life doesn't wait	4:13
15.	"Wir sind Gold"	We are Gold	3:18
Total length:			57:17

- Track 15 appears on the US version and German Limited Edition only. The song was previously available as a promo single that could be bought at concerts of the Band in 2016.
- "D-Zug" is a contraction of Durchgangzug, meaning express train.
- "Krieger" can be translated as both the singular and plural form. In the song's Lyrics only the plural form is used.
- The music for "In einem Boot" is based on Klaus Doldinger's score for the 1981 film Das Boot.

== Charts ==
=== Weekly charts ===
Chart (2017)	Peak position
Austrian Albums (Ö3 Austria)	10
German Albums (Offizielle Top 100)	1
Swiss Albums (Schweizer Hitparade)	8

=== Year-end charts ===
Chart (2017)	Position
German Albums (Offizielle Top 100)	88
