= Schock (album) =

2015 studio album by Eisbrecher

Studio album by Eisbrecher
- Released: 23 January 2015
- Recorded: 2014
- Genre: Neue Deutsche Härte, industrial metal
- Length: 52:29
- Label: Metropolis
- Producer: Noel Pix

Eisbrecher chronology
Die Hölle muss warten (2012)	Schock (2015)	Sturmfahrt (2017)

Singles from Schock
- 1. "1000 Narben" Released: 9 January 2015; 2. "Rot wie die Liebe" Released: 12 June 2015; 3. "Volle Kraft voraus" Released: 11 March 2016

Schock (German for Shock) is the sixth studio album by German Neue Deutsche Härte band Eisbrecher. It was released in 2015 by Metropolis Records. Schock has sold over 100,000 copies across Germany as of April 11, 2016, earning Gold status.

== Track listing ==
No.	Title	English translation	Length
1.	"Volle Kraft voraus"	Full Steam Ahead	3:16
2.	"1000 Narben"	1000 Scars	3:53
3.	"Schock"	Shock	3:46
4.	"Zwischen uns"	Between Us	3:38
5.	"Rot wie die Liebe"	Red Like Love	3:48
6.	"Himmel, Arsch und Zwirn"	For God's sake!	4:17
7.	"Schlachtbank"	Slaughterhouse	3:06
8.	"Dreizehn"	Thirteen	3:28
9.	"Unschuldsengel"	Little Innocent	3:53
10.	"Nachtfieber"	Night Fever	3:10
11.	"Noch zu retten"	Still Savable	4:37
12.	"Fehler machen Leute"	Mistakes Make People	3:44
13.	"Der Flieger"	The Aviator	3:29
14.	"So oder so"	Either Way	4:07

Bonus track
No.	Title	English translation	Length
15.	"Das steht dir gut" (Rheingold cover)	That Suits You Well	3:55

iTunes bonus track
No.	Title	English Translation	Length
16.	"Süßwasserfisch"	Freshwater Fish	3:05

== Charts ==
- Media Control Charts - #2
- Ö3 Austria Top 40 - #11
- Swiss Music Charts - #16
