= Neue Deutsche Härte =

Subgenre of rock music

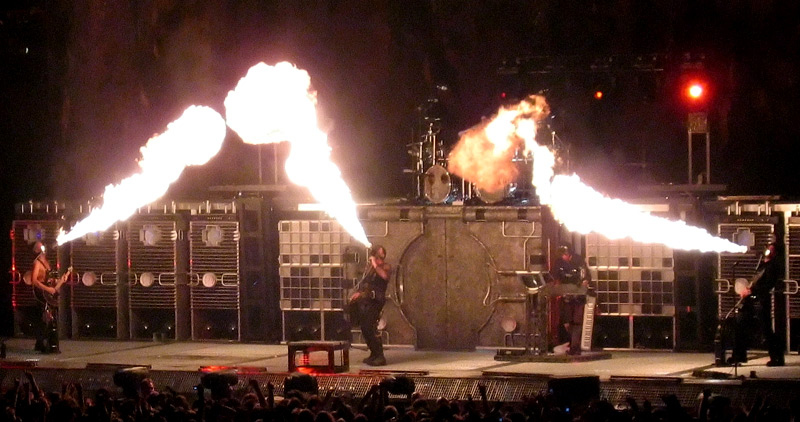
- Rammstein on stage at the Globe Arena in Stockholm, Sweden, 2004
- Etymology: German for "New German hardness"
- Other names: NDH; Tanzmetall; dance-metal
- Stylistic origins: Neue Deutsche Welle; alternative metal; groove metal; electro-industrial; techno; industrial metal
- Cultural origins: Early-to-mid 1990s, Germany and Austria
- Typical instruments: Vocals; electric guitar; electric bass guitar; drum kit; electronic musical synthesizer; electronic musical keyboards; drum machine; music sequencer; samples

Regional scenes
- Germany; Austria; Switzerland; Finland (as dance-metal); Sweden (as dance-metal)

Other topics
- Popular music in Germany; industrial metal; nu metal; industrial music; industrial rock; krautrock; progressive rock; progressive metal; rivetheads

Neue Deutsche Härte (German: [ˈnɔʏə ˈdɔʏtʃə ˈhɛʁtə]; lit. "New German Hardness", sometimes abbreviated as NDH), also known as dance-metal, (Note: Term used to describe NDH bands that do not sing in German) is a crossover style drawing from Neue Deutsche Welle, alternative metal, groove metal, electro-industrial and techno. It is also sometimes classified as a subgenre of industrial metal. NDH developed in Germany and Austria during the early-to-mid 1990s and early 2000s. Alluding to the style of Neue Deutsche Welle, the term was coined by the music press after the 1995 release of Rammstein's first studio album, Herzeleid.

== Characteristics ==
Neue Deutsche Härte describes a crossover style that is influenced by Neue Deutsche Welle, alternative metal and groove metal combining it with elements from electro-industrial and techno. Even though early NDH developed detached from industrial metal many people still classify it as a subgenre of industrial metal because of the major similarities developed mainly due to the more industrial influence of Rammstein on the genre. The lyrics of NDH are generally in German. NDH uses the basic setup of instruments for metal: electric guitar, bass guitar, drums and vocals, along with keyboard, synthesizers, samples and sometimes additional percussion. Emphasis is on a demonstration of predominance, by over-pronouncing certain syllables and sounds (such as the uvular or alveolar trill). The vocals are dominantly presenting in deep, male and clean voice. Some bands use screaming and death growls, which is also common, being heard in certain songs by Oomph!, Rammstein, Joachim Witt, Megaherz and Eisbrecher. NDH imagery is often strongly masculine and militaristic. Guitars are tuned low, usually to drop D or drop C, and are generally heavily distorted. The NDH style has crossed borders and its popularity has grown to such an extent that there are bands outside Germany that make NDH-music with their own languages for example Hanzel und Gretyl, Ruoska, and Raubtier.

== History ==
The rudiments of the NDH style were established by Oomph! on their seminal second album, Sperm (1994), and by Rammstein with their first album Herzeleid (1995). In those days, Oomph!'s biggest influence were groove metal bands such as Prong, Pantera and Sepultura. Rammstein, who take inspiration from a wide array of bands including Depeche Mode and Ministry, is the style's most famous and successful practitioner. NDH is especially successful in continental Europe; Rammstein have sold nearly four million records in Germany, while accumulating gold and platinum records in Austria, the Czech Republic, Denmark, the Netherlands, Norway, Poland, Romania, Sweden, Switzerland and Finland.

Oomph! achieved a gold record for their 2004 "Augen auf!" single in Austria and Germany. Eisbrecher's 2004 self-titled debut album entered at No. 13 on the Deutsche Alternative Top 20 Chart, while the group's second album (Antikörper) reached the No. 85 position on the German main chart. Other NDH groups include Hanzel und Gretyl, L'âme Immortelle and Unheilig.

== Cultural influence ==
In 2011, English comic and musician Bill Bailey parodied the Neue Deutsche Härte style by releasing a version of "Scarborough Fair" in the style of Rammstein.

== Music ==
Platz, Nym and Balanck describe Neue Deutsche Härte, in Nym's compilation Iridescent Dark, as a pronounced and powerful merging of German metal with hardcore influences and elements of techno – all coming together with the capabilities of modern music production. The instrumentation usually consists of guitars, bass guitars, drums, vocals, electronic synthesisers and sometimes drum machines. The electronic components of the instrumentation are often employed to create string arrangements, melody samples and loops, or background elements.

Previous descriptions of the style of NDH make reference to it being a stylistic crossover of many different subcultures. During its first surge in popularity, NDH proved to be a music direction which made use of heavy metal and hardcore influences as well as elements of techno with German lyrics. According to Martin Büsser, the style is characterised by its visual aesthetic of "searching for the best possible and most marketable midway." As a result, NDH incorporates electronic sound and martial rhythm with musical elements of heavy metal, dark metal and oftentimes light amounts of rapping.

Typical features such as highly technical distorted guitar riffs have been adopted from hard rock and heavy metal and are often modified post recording to add further effect to their sound. The guitar riffs are often played in staccato with a monotonous sound and are similar to those of popular modern metal from the 1990s. The rhythm focused riffs resemble those of alternative metal and groove metal bands. Just like groove metal, NDH bands lean towards mid-tempo riffs, which gain additional rhythm dominance through the use of syncopation. Additionally, strong distorted power chords and palm muting are typically incorporated into this style, and distorted and dominating basslines are also commonly used. The employment of electronic effects from synthesisers and keyboards are also characteristic of NDH, in which they are used to provide artificial string arrangements, melodic components and loops – both melodic hanger loops and background elements. The use of synthesisers and relatively simple rhythms is closely related to 1990s techno. The rhythm is occasionally created through the use of drum machines.

The vocals are mostly performed by men using a deep voice "enunciating every syllable". Female vocalists – such as Luci van Org from Übermutter, or Greta Czatlos in some releases from Untoten, are rarely represented as lead singers in the genre of NDH.

The rolled 'R' – popularised by Rammstein – is a frequently occurring feature. The vocal melody merges with the backing track and sometimes becomes Sprechgesang.

== Content ==
The lyrics often contain phrases laden with meaning and connotation in simple rhyme schemes that are semantically connected and often get repeated. The texts are often about general topics such as love, hate, jealousy, sexuality, religion and death, with a certain tendency to break taboos by dealing with shock topics like extreme forms of sadomasochism, necrophilia, incest, cannibalism and sexual abuse of children. Büsser calls this manner a gladiator show and display of masculinity that is simply based on shock. Vocals, instruments and manner are intended to display strength. Bands who use indulgent militaristic aesthetics or who make ambiguous reference to Nazi Germany have been harshly criticized; Rammstein and Joachim Witt in particular have been confronted regarding this issue many times. Rammstein has made several songs distancing themselves from Nazism, specifically "Links 2 3 4" and "Deutschland". A striking characteristic of the genre are the many band names that consist of conjoined nouns and that are intended to sound hard and strong when pronounced.

== Scene ==
Although NDH is popular, no separate youth subculture exists. The music genre developed independently from any scenes and instead finds its listeners in various subcultures such as the heavy metal subculture or the dark culture. Popular dark culture magazines such as Orkus, Sonic Seducer and Zillo frequently feature interviews and reviews about representatives of the NDH music genre. The popularity of the genre spread especially due to many NDH bands appearing at big events showcasing a multitude of genres (indie pop, alternative rock or alternative metal festivals) such as the Wacken Open Air festival but also by holding concerts and going on tours. Rammstein for example performed as a supporting act of the band Project Pitchfork, a band situated in the dark wave genre, on their "Alpha-Omega" tour in 1995.
