= Oomph! discography =

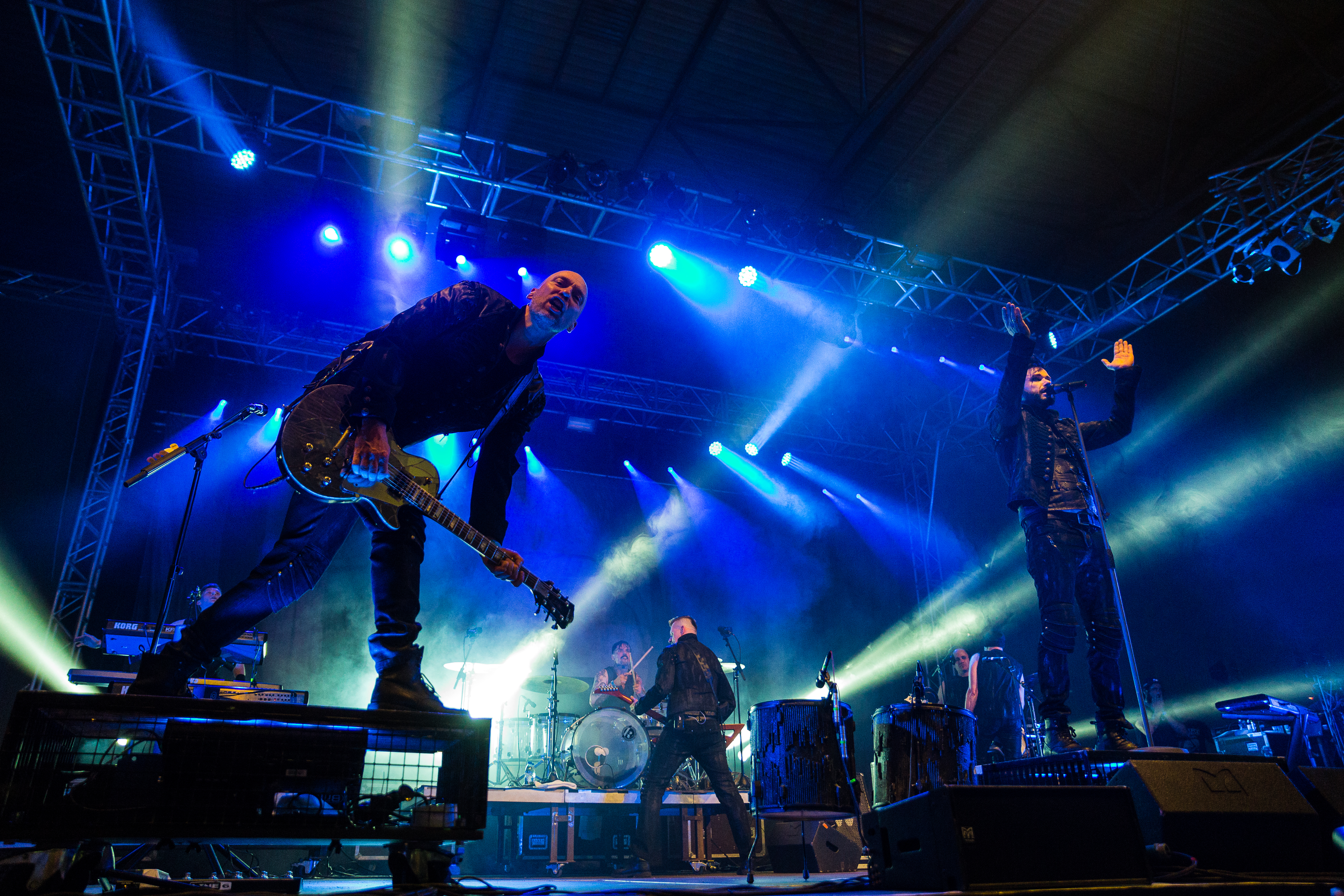
- Oomph! at Wave-Gotik-Treffen 2018
- Studio albums: 14
- Live albums: 1
- Compilation albums: 4
- Singles: 26
- Music videos: 26

The discography of Oomph!, a German rock band, often considered to be the original Neue Deutsche Härte musical group, consists of fourteen studio albums and one video album. Oomph! has also released twenty-three singles. The band was formed in mid-1989 by three musicians from Wolfsburg: singer/drummer Dero Goi, guitarist/programmer Andreas Crap and guitarist/bassist/programmer Robert Flux.

Oomph! debuted with the single "Ich bin Du", released in 1991. The following year, the band released their first studio album, the self-titled Oomph!, their only album to date with Machinery Records.

== Studio albums ==
Title	Year	Peak chart positions				Certifications
Title	Year	GER	AUT	SWI	EU	Certifications
Oomph!	1992	–	–	–	–	
Sperm	1994	–	–	–	–	
Defekt	1995	–	–	–	–	
Wunschkind	1996	–	–	–	–	
Unrein	1998	37	38	–	–	
Plastik	1999	23	–	–	–	
Ego	2001	21	60	–	–	
Wahrheit oder Pflicht	2004	2	2	7	–	BVMI: Platinum
GlaubeLiebeTod	2006	5	16	21	68	BVMI: Gold
Monster	2008	8	19	27	29	
Des Wahnsinns fette Beute	2012	15	41	71	–	
XXV	2015	10	42	59	–	
Ritual	2019	1	12	24	–	
Richter und Henker	2023	7	57	58	–	

== Compilation albums ==
Title	Year	Peak chart positions		
Title	Year	GER	AUT	GRC
1991–1996: The Early Works	1998	–	–	–
1998–2001: Best of Virgin Years	2006	–	–	–
Delikatessen	2006	72	59	–
Truth or Dare	2010	–	–	49

== Live albums ==
Title	Year	Peak chart positions
Title	Year	GER
Rohstoff	2007	40

== Singles ==
Title	Year	Peak chart position			Certifications	Album
Title	Year	GER	AUT	SWI	Certifications	Album
Ich bin Du	1991	–	–	–		Oomph!
Der neue Gott	1992	–	–	–		Oomph!
Breathtaker	1993	–	–	–		Sperm
Sex	1994	–	–	–		Sperm
3+1	1994	–	–	–		Sperm
Ice-Coffin	1995	–	–	–		Defekt
Gekreuzigt	1998	81	–	–		Unrein
Unsere Rettung	1998	–	–	–		Unrein
Das weiße Licht	1999	46	–	–		Plastik
Fieber (feat. Nina Hagen)	1999	–	–	–		Plastik
Niemand	2001	94	–	–		Ego
Supernova	2001	–	–	–		Ego
Augen auf!	2004	1	1	21	BVMI: Gold	Wahrheit oder Pflicht
Brennende Liebe (feat. L'Âme Immortelle)	2004	6	11	35		Wahrheit oder Pflicht
Sex hat keine Macht	2004	31	57	–		Wahrheit oder Pflicht
Gott ist ein Popstar	2006	12	14	93		GlaubeLiebeTod
Das letzte Streichholz	2006	27	37	–		GlaubeLiebeTod
Die Schlinge (feat. Apocalyptica)	2006	51	–	–		GlaubeLiebeTod
Gekreuzigt 2006/The Power of Love	2006	54	–	–		Delikatessen
Träumst du? (feat. Marta Jandová)	2007	9	48	–		Delikatessen
Wach auf!	2008	52	–	–		Monster
Labyrinth	2008	26	–	–		Monster
Sandmann	2009	60	–	–		Monster
Zwei Schritte vor	2012	–	–	–		Des Wahnsinns fette Beute
Alles aus Liebe	2015	–	–	–		XXV
Kein Liebeslied	2018	–	–	–		Ritual
Tausend Mann und ein Befehl	2018	–	–	–		Ritual
Wem Die Stunde Schlägt	2023	–	–	–		Richter und Henker
Richter und Henker	2023	–	–	–		Richter und Henker
Nur ein Mensch	2023	–	–	—		Richter und Henker

== Music videos ==
- 1994 – "Sex"
- 1995 – "Ice-Coffin"
- 1998 – "Gekreuzigt"
- 1998 – "Gekreuzigt" (Remix)
- 1999 – "Das weiße Licht"
- 1999 – "Fieber" (feat. Nina Hagen)
- 2001 – "Supernova"
- 2001 – "Niemand"
- 2004 – "Augen auf!"
- 2004 – "Brennende Liebe" (feat. L'Âme Immortelle)
- 2004 – "Sex hat keine Macht"
- 2006 – "Gott ist ein Popstar"
- 2006 – "Das letzte Streichholz"
- 2006 – "Die Schlinge" (feat. Apocalyptica)
- 2006 – "Gekreuzigt 2006"
- 2006 – "The Power of Love"
- 2007 – "Träumst du?" (feat. Marta Jandová)
- 2008 – "Wach auf!"
- 2008 – "Beim ersten Mal tut's immer weh"
- 2008 – "Labyrinth"
- 2008 – "Auf Kurs"
- 2009 – "Sandmann"
- 2012 – "Ernten was wir Säen"
- 2012 – "Zwei Schritte vor"
- 2015 – "Alles aus Liebe"
- 2018 – "Tausend Mann und ein Befehl"
- 2019 – "Im Namen des Vaters"
- 2023 – "Wem die Stunde schlägt"
- 2023 – "Richter und Henker"
- 2023 – "Nur ein Mensch"
- 2024 – "Soll das Liebe sein?

== Remixes ==
- "Upperworld" – Syntec
- "Ich sehe dich" – Such A Surge
- "L 'Oasis" – La Floa Maldita
- "Good God (The Man)" – Korn
- "Und ... ich lauf" – Joachim Witt
- "Painful Reconstructed" EP – Sin
- "Freedom" – De/Vision
- "Sheila" – Rauhfaser
- "Here Comes the Pain" – Farmer Boys
- "Silver Surger" – Such a Surge
- "Keilerkopf I" – Keilerkopf
- "Hülle" – Keilerkopf
- "Traumschloss" – Keilerkopf
- "Monochrom" – Herzer
- "Glas" – Herzer
- "Supergestört und Superversaut" – Joachim Witt
- "Krieger" – And One
- "Ernten was wir säen" – Die Fantastischen Vier
