= Rohstoff =

Live album by Oomph!
- Released: 20 July 2007
- Recorded: 2006, 2007
- Genre: Neue Deutsche Härte; industrial rock; industrial metal
- Label: GUN

Oomph! chronology
GlaubeLiebeTod (2006)	Rohstoff (2007)	Monster (2008)

Rohstoff (German for "Raw stuff" or "raw material") is the first live DVD by German rock band Oomph!. It features live footage consisting of 23 songs, music videos of the band's singles, as well as making-of videos and interviews. The audio version of the live concert is available only through digital download.

== Live ==
1. "Fragment"
2. "Träumst du?"
3. "Unsere Rettung"
4. "Keine Luft mehr"
5. "Du willst es doch auch"
6. "Fieber"
7. "Wenn du weinst"
8. "Die Schlinge"
9. "Supernova"
10. "Sex hat keine Macht"
11. "Mitten ins Herz"
12. "Das letzte Streichholz"
13. "Dein Feuer"
14. "Das weiße Licht"
15. "Mein Schatz"
16. "Dein Weg"
17. "Gekreuzigt"
18. "Niemand"
19. "Augen auf!"
20. "Brennende Liebe"
21. "Gott ist ein Popstar"
22. "Menschsein"
23. "Burn Your Eyes"

== Videoclips ==
- "Träumst du?"
- "The Power of Love"
- "Gekreuzigt 2006"
- "Die Schlinge"
- "Das letzte Streichholz"
- "Gott ist ein Popstar"
- "God Is a Popstar"
- Sex hat keine Macht"
- "Brennende Liebe"
- "Augen auf!"
- "Niemand"
- "Supernova"
- "Fieber"
- "Das weiße Licht"
- "Gekreuzigt"

== Other ==
- Making of "Träumst du?"
- Making of "Gekreuzigt 2006" and "The Power of Love"
- Making of "Die Schlinge"
- Making of "Das letzte Streichholz"
- Making of "Gott ist ein Popstar" and "God Is a Popstar"
- Making of "Sex hat keine Macht"
- Making of "Brennende Liebe"
- Making of "Augen auf!"
- Making of "Supernova"
- Interview with the band

== Charts ==
Chart (2007)	Peak position
German Albums (Offizielle Top 100)	40
