= Das weisse Licht =

Single by Oomph!

from the album Plastik
- Released: 30 August 1999
- Recorded: 1999
- Genre: Industrial rock gothic rock industrial metal alternative metal
- Length: 37:33
- Label: Virgin
- Songwriters: Crap, Robert Flux, Stephan Musiol

Oomph! singles chronology
"Unsere Rettung" (1998)	"Das weisse Licht" (1999)	"Fieber" (1999)

"Das weisse Licht", alternatively spelled Das weiße Licht (German for "The white light"), is a song by German rock band Oomph! and the first single from their 1999 album Plastik.

== Music video ==
The music video is set in a small experimental town where almost every human has been replaced with a cyborg. Almost, because Dero Goi has not been replaced yet. Dero realizes the truth due to an accident a woman had, and tries to escape. At the end, it turns out that Dero has already been copied, and it's a machine which wanted to escape and prevent being converted.

== Track listing ==
=== Standard edition ===
1. Das weisse Licht (Single Version)
2. Das weisse Licht (Fütter mich Remix by Schallbau)
3. Das weisse Licht (Cleener Remix by Daniel Myer)
4. Das weisse Licht (Camouflage Remix by Heiko Maile)
5. Das weisse Licht (Headcrashed Remix by Herwig Meyszner)

=== Limited edition ===
1. Das weisse Licht (Single Version)
2. Das weisse Licht (Fütter mich Remix by Schallbau)
3. Das weisse Licht (Cleener Remix by Daniel Myer)
4. Das weisse Licht (Camouflage Remix by Heiko Maile)
5. Das weisse Licht (Headcrashed Remix by Herwig Meyszner)
6. Das weisse Licht (Haujobb Remix by Daniel Myer)
7. Das weisse Licht (Submarine Remix by Econic)
