= Ego (Oomph! album) =

Studio album by Oomph!
- Released: 7 July 2001
- Recorded: 2000
- Studio: Nagelstudio (Calberlah, Germany)
- Genre: Neue Deutsche Härte; industrial rock; industrial metal; gothic metal
- Length: 59:20
- Language: German, English
- Label: Virgin Schallplatten
- Producer: Oomph!

Oomph! chronology
Plastik (1999)	Ego (2001)	Wahrheit oder Pflicht (2004)

Singles from Ego
- 1. "Supernova" Released: 7 July 2001; 2. "Niemand" Released: 11 September 2001

Ego is the seventh studio album by German Neue Deutsche Härte band Oomph!, released on 7 July 2001 by German record label Virgin Schallplatten. The album took place in the German album charts. The album has a reissued version that includes two bonus tracks: ‘Niemand‘ and an unplugged version of ‘Swallow‘. The reissued version was released on 9 June 2019 through Austrian record label Napalm records.

== Track listing ==
1. "Ego" – 4:19
2. "Supernova" – 3:59
3. "Willst du frei sein?" ("Do you want to be free?") – 3:54
4. "Drop the Lie" – 3:45
5. "Bitter" – 4:17
6. "Transformation" – 4:02
7. "Atem" ("Breath") – 3:58
8. "Serotonin" (instrumental) – 2:14
9. "Swallow" – 5:11
10. "Viel zu tief" ("Much too deep") – 3:47
11. "My Darkest Cave" – 3:38
12. "Rette mich" ("Rescue me") – 4:25
13. "Who You Are" – 3:58
14. "Kontrollverlust" ("Loss of control") – 4:46
15. "Dopamin" (instrumental) – 2:43
16. "Träum weiter" ("Dream on") – 1:41
17. "Niemand" ("Nobody") – 4:19 (2019 Reissue Bonus Track)
18. "Swallow" (Unplugged) – 2:47 (2019 Reissue Bonus Track)

== Singles ==
- "Supernova" (B-side: "Niemand")

== Music videos ==
- "Supernova"
- "Swallow"
- "Niemand"

== Personnel ==
Oomph!

- Dero Goi – Lead vocals, drums
- Andreas Crap – Lead guitar, sampler
- Robert Flux – Rhythm guitar, bass, keyboards

Additional personnel

- Art Direction, Design – Friedel Muders (FUEGO)
- Björn Gralla – Management
- Ted Jensen – Mastering
- OOMPH – Mastering
- Dirk Schelpmeier – Photography
- OOMPH! – Photography
- OOMPH! – Producer
- Robert Flux – Recording, Mixing
