= Namenlos =

Studio album by L'Âme Immortelle
- Released: January 25, 2008
- Recorded: 2007
- Genre: EBM; Gothic rock Darkwave
- Label: Trisol Music Group
- Producer: L'Âme Immortelle

L'Âme Immortelle chronology
Auf deinen Schwingen (2006)	Namenlos (2008)	Durch fremde Hand (2008)

Namenlos (German for "nameless") is the eighth studio album from Austrian band L'Âme Immortelle.

== Track listing ==
CD1: Namenlos

No.	Title	Lyrics	Music	English title	Length
1.	"Vergessen"	Anonymous	Kraushofer	Forgotten	1:50
2.	"1000 Voices"	Rainer	Rainer		4:30
3.	"Behind the Light"	Rainer	Rainer/Kraushofer		4:16
4.	"Bleib"	Rainer	Rainer/Kraushofer	Stay	3:50
5.	"Requiem"	Rainer	Rainer/Kraushofer		4:27
6.	"Lost" (arranged by M. Höfert)	Rainer	Kraushofer		1:46
7.	"Blutrot"	Rainer	Rainer/Kraushofer	Crimson	4:16
8.	"Reborn"	Rainer	Rainer		3:50
9.	"Es tut mir leid"	Rainer	Rainer/Kraushofer	I'm Sorry	3:59
10.	"Niemals"	Rainer	Rainer/Kraushofer	Never	4:37
11.	"Jenseits der Schatten" (arranged by M. Höfert)	Rainer	Kraushofer	Beyond the Shadows	1:41
12.	"The Cleansing"	Rainer	Rainer/Kraushofer		4:08
13.	"Namenlos"	Graf von Wickenburg	Rainer/Kraushofer	Nameless	6:11

CD2: Erinnerung

All lyrics are written by Thomas Rainer; all music is composed by Thomas Rainer and Sonja Kraushofer.

No.	Title	Note	Length
1.	"Erneuerung" (Renewal)		1:00
2.	"When the Sun has ceased to shine"		3:42
3.	"Love is Lost"	Performed by Antoni Jones	4:06
4.	"When the Sun has ceased to shine"	Performed by Spiritual Front	3:32
5.	"Es tut mir leid" (I'm Sorry)	Performed by Steinkind	4:51
6.	"Niemals" (Never)	Performed by Sieben	4:36
7.	"Requiem"	Performed by Whispers in the Shadow	4:23
8.	"Erinnerung" (Memory)	An Essay by Thomas Sabottka	3:41
