= Momente (album) =

Studio album by L'Âme Immortelle
- Released: April 2012
- Recorded: 2012
- Genre: Darkwave
- Label: Trisol Music Group
- Producer: L'Âme Immortelle

L'Âme Immortelle chronology
Durch fremde Hand (2008)	Momente (2012)

Momente (German for "moments") is the tenth studio album from Austrian band L'Âme Immortelle.

== Track listing ==
All lyrics are written by Thomas Rainer; all music is composed by Thomas Rainer and Sonja Kraushofer.

No.	Title	English title	Length
1.	"L’étang mâlo"	The Little Pond	1:47
2.	"No Goodbye"		4:18
3.	"Absolution"		3:55
4.	"Wie Tränen im Regen"	Like Tears in the Rain	4:39
5.	"Empty"		4:00
6.	"Demon Be Gone"		3:43
7.	"The Heart"		4:59
8.	"Banish"		4:22
9.	"Why Can't I Make You Feel"		3:49
10.	"Dort draußen"	Out There	3:45
11.	"Hold Me"		4:43

== Charts ==
Chart performance for Momente
Chart (2012)	Peak position
German Albums (Offizielle Top 100)	62
