= Damien Cain =

German-born alternative rock musician

- Cain in 2026
- Born: Marc Sieper; 1970 (age 55–56); Ruhr, West Germany
- Occupations: Singer-songwriter; lyricist; audiobook producer
- Years active: 1988–present
- Website: damiencain.com

Damien Cain (born 1970) is a German-born singer-songwriter and audiobook producer based in Ireland. He was part of the gothic rock band CAIN, whose song "Age of Darkness" served as the closing theme for the audio drama series Geisterjäger John Sinclair.

== Early life ==
Cain was born as Marc Sieper in 1970 in the Ruhr region of West Germany. He began writing poetry at age 14 and formed his first band, Celtic Crypt, with a school friend. The band gave its first public performance in 1988.

In 2020, he moved to Ireland.

== Music career ==
Damien Cain continued performing in bands. Celtic Crypt was resurrected in 2005 and occasionally performed live.

In 1995, Cain wrote "Dracula – The Musical", which was staged for two years in the Ruhr area in Germany.

In 2000, his song "Age of Darkness", recorded under the name CAIN, was selected as the closing theme for the relaunched Geisterjäger John Sinclair audio drama series. The song was certified with an Impala Diamond Award for exceeding 250,000 units sold.

Cain also worked as a lyricist and producer. In 2006, he contributed the lyrics for the song "Dein Herz" by the Austrian band L'Âme Immortelle, which entered the German single charts. For Visionen, a 2006 double album inspired by the works of Edgar Allan Poe, he co-wrote "Elenore" with composers Simon Bertling and Christian Hagitte. The song was performed by Christopher Lee.

In 2010, he developed CAIN into a band, performing as a duo with singer Kirstin New. In September 2012, CAIN contributed "Save a Heart" and "The Last Dance" to Dark Symphonies, a John Sinclair tribute compilation featuring Xavier Naidoo, Nena and Deichkind. The album reached number 63 on the German album charts.

In 2013, he released the album "Moonstruck" with the band CAIN, featuring guest contributions by Wayne Hussey of The Mission. On the subsequent tour, the band played at venues and festivals including NCN (Nocturnal Culture Night), Turbinenhalle Oberhausen, Castle Rock Festival and E-Werk, Cologne.

In 2025, Cain re-released "Elenore" to mark the tenth anniversary of Christopher Lee's death. His solo album Standarte was released on December 12, 2025. In January 2026, Standarte entered both the German Alternative Charts and the American Alternative Charts, reaching a peak position of number 4. The title track Standarte was awarded “Best European Metal 2026” by the Los Angeles based InterContinental Music Awards. In 2026, Cain released "Caleb", a duet with British singer Jamie Wiltshire, as the first single from Standarte.

== Discography (selected) ==
=== Studio albums ===
- Dracula – Das Musical (1995, Various Artists)
- Wallenstein (2007, with Celtic Crypt)
- Moonstruck (2013, with CAIN)
- Standarte (2025)

=== Singles ===
- "Age of Darkness" (2000, with CAIN)
- "Raise!" (2014, with CAIN)
- "Elenore" (2025, with Christopher Lee)
- "Caleb (JD Radio Edit)" (2026, with Jamie Wiltshire)
