= Best of Indie Years =

Greatest hits album by L'Âme Immortelle
- Released: 2008
- Genres: EBM; Aggrotech; Darkwave
- Label: GUN Records

L'Âme Immortelle chronology
| 10 Jahre – Best Of (2007) | Best of Indie Years (2008) | Durch fremde Hand (2008) |

Best of Indie Years is the second compilation album by L'Âme Immortelle.

== Track listing ==
1. "Lieder die wie Wunden bluten"
2. "Winter of my Soul"
3. "Silver Rain"
4. "Will You?"
5. "Love is Lost"
6. "Resurrection"
7. "In the Heart of Europe (original version)"
8. "Redemption"
9. "Scheideweg"
10. "Ich gab dir alles"
11. "Another Day"
12. "Epitaph"
13. "Leaving"
14. "Betrayal"
15. "Letting Go"
