= Ritual (Oomph! album) =

Studio album by Oomph!
- Released: 18 January 2019
- Recorded: 2018
- Genre: Neue Deutsche Härte
- Length: 44:18
- Label: Napalm
- Producer: Oomph!

Oomph! chronology
XXV (2015)	Ritual (2019)	Richter und Henker (2023)

Singles from Ritual
- 1. "Kein Liebeslied" Released: 30 November 2018; 2. "Tausend Mann und ein Befehl" Released: 4 January 2019

Ritual is the thirteenth studio album by German Neue Deutsche Härte band Oomph!. The title was announced in a post on the band's official Facebook page on 15 November 2018. The band had earlier said they expected the album to release on 18 January 2019. On the following day, the official artwork for the album and a track listing, pre-order URL, and a segment of upcoming single "Kein Liebeslied" (Not a love song) were released, as well as reconfirming the release date.

"Kein Liebeslied" was released on 30 November 2018 as the album's first single. The album's second single "Tausend Mann und ein Befehl" was released on 4 January 2019. All songs were released on January 18. At the end of its release week, Ritual became the band's first number 1 album, in their native Germany. Ritual is the last Oomph! album to feature singer Dero Goi, following his departure in 2021.

== Tour ==
The band toured in support of the album from 1 March 2019 at the Capitol in Hanover, Germany, to 30 March 2019 at the Dark Electro Festival in Warsaw, Poland.

== Track listing ==
No.	Title	English translation	Length
1.	"Tausend Mann und ein Befehl"	A Thousand Men and one Order	4:19
2.	"Achtung! Achtung!"	Attention! Attention!	3:37
3.	"Kein Liebeslied"	Not a Love Song	3:36
4.	"Trümmerkinder"	Children of Debris	4:20
5.	"Europa" (feat. Chris Harms)	Europe	4:25
6.	"Im Namen des Vaters"	In the Name of the Father	3:56
7.	"Das Schweigen der Lämmer"	The Silence of the Lambs	3:49
8.	"TRRR – FCKN – HTLR"		3:32
9.	"Phönix aus der Asche"	Phoenix from the Ashes	4:22
10.	"Lass' die Beute frei"	Release the Prey	4:13
11.	"Seine Seele"	His Soul	4:09
Total length:			44:18

=== Bonus tracks ===
These tracks are included on the digital download, digipak CD, vinyl, and limited edition box set releases.

No.	Title	English translation	Length
12.	"In der Stille der Nacht"	In the Dead of Night	4:14
13.	"Lazarus"		4:39
14.	"TRRR – FCKN – HTLR" (Lord of the Lost Remix)		3:22
Total length:			12:15

In addition, the limited edition box set features a 7" vinyl with the exclusive song "Ich bin ein Fels" ("I Am a Rock").

== Charts ==
Chart performance for Ritual
Chart (2019)	Peak position
Austrian Albums (Ö3 Austria)	12
German Albums (Offizielle Top 100)	1
Swiss Albums (Schweizer Hitparade)	24
