= Des Wahnsinns fette Beute =

Studio album by Oomph!
- Released: 29 May 2012
- Recorded: 2011
- Genre: Neue Deutsche Härte
- Length: 53:24
- Label: Sony; Columbia Records
- Producer: Oomph!

Oomph! chronology
Truth or Dare (2010)	Des Wahnsinns fette Beute (2012)	XXV (2015)

Singles from Des Wahnsinns fette Beute
- 1. "Zwei Schritte vor" Released: 4 May 2012

Professional ratings
Review scores
Source	Rating
COMA Music Magazine	(Favorable)
Monstersandcritics.de	4/5 stars

Des Wahnsinns fette Beute ("Madness' juicy prey") is the eleventh studio album by German Neue Deutsche Härte band Oomph!. It was released on 29 May 2012 through American record label Columbia records. It was described by the band as being a big change from their usual gothic and industrial metal type of music. This made the album highly anticipated amongst fans and the German rock music community. One single was released from the album, "Zwei Schritte vor" (Two Steps Forward), on 4 May 2012.

== Track listing ==
No.	Title	English translation	Length
1.	"Unzerstörbar"	Indestructible	3:41
2.	"Zwei Schritte vor"	Two Steps Forward	4:23
3.	"Such mich find mich"	Seek Me, Find Me	3:31
4.	"Bis der Spiegel zerbricht"	Until the Mirror Breaks	3:36
5.	"Die Geister die ich rief"	The Spirits That I Called	3:06
6.	"Bonobo"		4:00
7.	"Deine Eltern"	Your Parents	4:03
8.	"Kleinstadtboy"	Small Town Boy	4:01
9.	"Regen"	Rain	4:14
10.	"Kosmonaut"	Cosmonaut	4:01
11.	"Komm zurück"	Come Back	3:11
12.	"Aus meiner Haut"	Out of My Skin	3:09
13.	"Seemannsrose"	Sailor's Rose	3:09
14.	"Unendlich"	Infinite	5:19
Total length:			53:24

Deluxe edition bonus tracks
No.	Title	English translation	Length
15.	"Fütter mich"	Feed Me	3:33
16.	"Der Tod ist nur ein Herzschlag entfernt"	Death is Only a Heartbeat Away	4:02
Total length:			60:59

=== Bonus DVD ===
1. Studio report "Des Wahnsinns fette Beute"
2. Zwei Schritte Neon
3. Geister Regen
4. Spiegel Seemann
5. Photo gallery (Oomph! vs. Oliver Rath)
6. Zwei Schritte vor (Video)
7. Zwei Schritte vor "Making of"
8. Ernten was wir säen (Video)

== Personnel ==
Oomph!

- Dero Goi – Lead vocals, drums
- Andreas Crap – Lead guitar, sampler
- Robert Flux – Rhythm guitar, bass, keyboards

Additional Personnel

- Benjamin Brauers – Artwork
- Florian Bredl – Artwork
- Robert Flux – Mixing
- Ted Jensen – Mastering

== Sources ==
- "Oomph! – Des Wahnsinns Fette Beute (2012)". www.musicbay.co. Archived from the original on 18 May 2015.
- "OOMPH! Official". Oomphband.tumblr.com.
- "Official Website". Official OOMPH!.
- "Album Leaks". MusicBay.
