= ...In einer Zukunft aus Tränen und Stahl =

Studio album by L'Âme Immortelle
- Released: 1999 (EU); 2004 (US)
- Recorded: 1998
- Genre: Aggrotech, darkwave
- Length: 61:02
- Label: MOS Records
- Producer: L'Âme Immortelle, Steve Noi

L'Âme Immortelle chronology
Lieder die wie Wunden bluten (1997)	...In einer Zukunft aus Tränen und Stahl (1999)	Wenn der letzte Schatten fällt (1999)

...In einer Zukunft aus Tränen und Stahl ("In a future of tears and steel") is the second studio album from Austrian darkwave band L'Âme Immortelle.

== Track listing ==
No.	Title	Lyrics	Music	Length
1.	"Dusk Embraces Loneliness"	Rainer	Rainer	4:31
2.	"Love Is Lost"	Rainer	Rainer	5:38
3.	"Innocent Guilt"	Rainer	Rainer	5:48
4.	"Bitterkeit"	Rainer	Medwenitsch	4:56
5.	"Will You?"	Rainer	Medwenitsch	5:32
6.	"To Everlasting Oblivion"	John Marston	Medwenitsch	4:07
7.	"Aus Tränen und Stahl"	(instrumental)	Rainer/Medwenitsch	4:25
8.	"Place of Refuge"	Rainer	Rainer	5:24
9.	"Beyond Your Borrowed Dreams"	Rainer	Rainer	5:36
10.	"My Guide"	Rainer	Rainer	4:58
11.	"The Immortal Part"	A. E. Housman	Rainer	4:56

Bonus tracks in the first reissue (Trisol Records)
No.	Title	Lyrics	Music	Length
12.	"Beyond Your Borrowed Dreams (overloaded)"	Rainer	Rainer	5:11

Bonus tracks in the second reissue (Supersonic Records)
No.	Title	Lyrics	Music	Length
12.	"Echoes"	Rainer	Rainer	5:21
13.	"No Trust"	Rainer	Rainer	4:49

== Personnel ==
- Thomas Rainer – vocals, keyboards, lyrics, composition and production
- Sonja Kraushofer – vocals
- Hannes Medwenitsch – keyboards, composition and production
