= Lieder die wie Wunden bluten =

Studio album by L'Âme Immortelle
- Released: 1997 (EU); 2004 (US)
- Genre: Aggrotech; Darkwave
- Length: 70:37
- Label: MOS Records

L'Âme Immortelle chronology
Lieder die wie Wunden bluten (1997)	...In einer Zukunft aus Tränen und Stahl (1998)

Lieder die wie Wunden bluten (German: "songs that bleed like wounds") is the first studio album from Austrian darkwave band L'Âme Immortelle.

== Track listing ==
1. "Licht tötet Schatten" (Light kills Shadows) – 3:55
2. "Figure in the Mirror" – 4:02
3. "Winter of My Soul" – 4:36
4. "Into Thy Gentle Embrace" – 5:38
5. "Life Will Never Be the Same Again" – 5:39
6. "Flammenmeer" (Sea of Flames) – 4:21
7. "Crimson Skies" – 5:33
8. "The Night is My Shelter" – 6:26
9. "Lieder die wie Wunden bluten" (Songs That Bleed Like Wounds) – 3:08
10. "These Mortal Feelings" – 5:46
11. "Die Zeit in der die Freundschaft starb" (The Time the Friendship died) – 5:06
12. "Brother Against Brother" – 5:27
13. "Life Will Never Be the Same Again" (Klassische Fassung) – 5:39
14. "Die tote Kirche" (The Dead Church) – 5:23

== US Track listing ==
1. "Licht tötet Schatten"
2. "Figure in the Mirror"
3. "Winter of My Soul"
4. "Into Thy Gentle Embrace"
5. "Life Will Never Be the Same Again"
6. "Flammenmeer"
7. "Crimson Skies"
8. "The Night is My Shelter"
9. "Lieder die wie Wunden bluten"
10. "These Mortal Feelings"
11. "Die Zeit in der die Freundschaft starb"
12. "Brother Against Brother"
13. "Die tote Kirche"
14. "Life Will Never Be the Same Again" (Klassische Fassung)
15. "Seelensturm" (Soul Storm) (Live Berlin 2004 bonus track)
