= Unrein =

Studio album by Oomph!
- Released: 27 February 1998
- Recorded: 1997
- Genre: Industrial metal; alternative metal; gothic metal
- Length: 69:54
- Label: Virgin
- Producer: Oomph!

Oomph! chronology
1991–96: The Early Works (1998)	Unrein (1998)	Plastik (1999)

Singles from Unrein
- 1. "Gekreuzigt" Released: 23 January 1998; 2. "Unsere Rettung" Released: 27 April 1998

Unrein (German for "Impure") is the fifth studio album by German Industrial metal band Oomph!. It is their first album released on Virgin Schallplatten.

== Track listing ==
1. Mutters Schoß (Mother's Lap) (01:12)
2. Unsere Rettung (Our Salvation) (05:04)
3. Die Maske (The Mask) (06:06)
4. My Hell (05:19)
5. Gekreuzigt (Crucified) (04:22)
6. Zero Endorphine (03:06) (instrumental)
7. Willst du mein Leben entern? (Do You Want to Board My Life?) (04:20)
8. (Why I'll Never Be) Clean Again (05:28)
9. Unrein (Impure) (05:51)
10. Anniversary (04:51)
11. Foil (04:31)
12. Bastard (06:51)
13. Another Disease (05:30)
14. Meine Wunden (My Wounds) (07:15)

2019 Napalm Records re-release bonus tracks

- 15. This Time (4:36)
- 16. Monolith (4:20) (instrumental)

== Credits ==
- Produced by Oomph!
- Music composed by Oomph!
- Lyrics written by Dero Goi

== Personnel ==
Oomph!

- Dero Goi – lead vocals, drums
- Andreas Crap – lead guitar, sampler
- Robert Flux – rhythm guitar, bass, keyboards

Additional personnel

- Next Level – Photography
- Jor Jenka – Photography, Artwork
- Lennart Nillson – Cover Photo
- Mathias Bothor – Additional Photography
