= Brennende Liebe =

Single by Oomph! featuring L'Âme Immortelle
- Released: 10 May 2004
- Recorded: 2004
- Genre: Neue Deutsche Härte; industrial metal
- Length: 22:24
- Label: Gun
- Songwriter(s): Rene Bachmann, Thomas Doeppner, Stephan Musiol

Oomph! singles chronology
"Augen Auf!" (2004)	"Brennende Liebe" (2004)	"Sex hat keine Macht" (2004)

"Brennende Liebe" (German for "Burning Desire") is a song by German rock band Oomph! and the second single from their 2004 album Wahrheit oder Pflicht (second edition). At first, the single was released as a B-side single like "Niemand" had been, but later the song appeared on the re-edition of Wahrheit oder Pflicht. The song features Sonja Kraushofer from L'Âme Immortelle doing about half the lines.

== Music video ==
The music video is based upon Bride of Frankenstein. Dero is a mad scientist and Crap and Flux are his "medical" assistants, bringing monsters to life. They have already created a monster like Frankenstein's, and now they are working on a female, presumably to become Dero's bride instead of the male monster´s. In the video, the male monster works as an assistant, but when the monster picks the chosen brain for the female he accidentally dropped the brain, so he takes a different one; Dero gets suspicious but he and the rest of the band continue working. To Dero's disappointment, when the female monster is brought to life and sees Dero she screams in horror and faints into the male monster's arms; when she see him she falls in love with the male monster who was feeling the same way even before she came to life, and commands him to kill their creators (the full band). The monster chokes Dero (and maybe Flux and Crap) to death and takes his brain and those of the other band members in three beakers full of embalming fluid and the two monsters leave the lab.

== Track listing ==
=== Standard ===
1. Brennende Liebe (feat. L'Âme Immortelle)
2. Brennende Liebe (Transporterraum Mix)
3. Brennende Liebe (Hot Love Mix)

=== Limited edition ===
1. Brennende Liebe (feat. L'Âme Immortelle)
2. Eiszeit (Ideal cover)
3. Kill Me Again
4. Brennende Liebe (Transporterraum Mix)
5. Brennende Liebe (Hot Love Mix)
6. Brennende Liebe (videotrack)

== Charts ==
=== Weekly charts ===
Chart (2004)	Peak position
Austria (Ö3 Austria Top 40)	11
Germany (GfK)	6

=== Year-end charts ===
Chart (2004)	Position
Germany (Official German Charts)	87
