= GlaubeLiebeTod =

Studio album by Oomph!
- Released: 24 March 2006
- Recorded: 2005
- Genre: Neue Deutsche Härte; industrial rock; industrial metal
- Label: GUN Records
- Producer: Oomph!

Oomph! chronology
Wahrheit oder Pflicht (2004)	GlaubeLiebeTod (2006)	1998-2001: Best of Virgin Years (2006)

Singles from GlaubeLiebeTod
- 1. "Gott ist ein Popstar" Released: 24 February 2006; 2. "Das letzte Streichholz" Released: 12 May 2006; 3. "Die Schlinge" Released: 4 August 2006; 4. "Träumst du?" Released: 9 February 2007

GlaubeLiebeTod ("FaithLoveDeath") is the ninth studio album by German Neue Deutsche Härte band Oomph!. It was released in 24 March 2006.

GlaubeLiebeTod was released in three versions: a basic one inside a jewel case and without a booklet; a standard album with jewel case and a booklet and a premium album as a digipak with enhanced CD-ROM content and two bonus tracks (see below).

The album achieved Gold status in early September 2015 having sold more than 100,000 copies in Germany.

== Track listing ==
All music by Oomph! except track 4 (by Ennio Morricone and Oomph!). All lyrics by Dero Goi except track 6 (by Erich Kästner).

1. Gott ist ein Popstar! ("God is a popstar") - 3:53
2. Das letzte Streichholz ("The last match") - 3:37
3. Träumst du? ("Are you dreaming?") - 3:57
4. Die Schlinge ("The noose") - 3:58
5. Du willst es doch auch ("You want it too") - 3:27
6. Eine Frau spricht im Schlaf ("A woman talks in her sleep") - 3:58
7. Mein Schatz ("My precious") - 3:38
8. Dreh dich nicht um ("Don't turn around") - 3:28
9. Land in Sicht ("Land in sight") - 4:06
10. Tanz in den Tod ("Dance into death") - 3:26
11. Ich will deine Seele ("I want your soul") - 3:20
12. Zuviel Liebe kann dich töten ("Too much love can kill you") - 3:48
13. Wenn du mich lässt ("If you let me") (digipak bonus track) - 3:51
14. Menschsein ("Being human") (digipak bonus track) - 3:44

== Personnel ==
Oomph!

- Dero Goi – lead vocals, drums
- Andreas Crap – guitars and keyboards
- Robert Flux – samples and guitars

Guest musicians

- Marta Jandová - vocals (on Träumst Du?)
- Apocalyptica - cello (on Die Schlinge)

== Music Videos ==
- "Gott ist ein Popstar!"
- "Das letzte Streichholz"
- "Träumst du?"
- "Die Schlinge"

== Charts ==
=== Weekly charts ===
Chart (2006)	Peak position
Austrian Albums (Ö3 Austria)	16
German Albums (Offizielle Top 100)	5
Swiss Albums (Schweizer Hitparade)	21

=== Year-end charts ===
Chart (2006)	Position
German Albums (Offizielle Top 100)	78
