= Träumst du? =

Single by Oomph! featuring Marta Jandová

from the album GlaubeLiebeTod
- Released: 9 February 2007
- Recorded: 2006
- Genre: Neue Deutsche Härte; industrial metal
- Length: 15:47
- Label: Gun

"Träumst du?" (German for "Are you dreaming?") is a song by German rock band Oomph! and the fourth single from their album GlaubeLiebeTod. The single edition features Marta Jandová on vocals. The standard version of the single includes edited version of the song as well as a remix. The Premium edition includes a live version of the song "Augen auf!", a bonus track and a video.

"Träumst du?" was performed at the 2007 edition of the Bundesvision Song Contest along with Marta, giving the band first place with 147 points.

== Music video ==
The music video depicts the dream of a young female student. In her dream, the band members invade the school presumably to observe Marta's teaching. As some of the male students enjoy being physically punished by their teacher, the school groundskeeper goes into a closet which has apparently been modified to serve as an observatory for spying on Marta. The groundskeeper engages in voyeuristic behavior until the end of the dream, when the band discovers and removes the spying devices and trace it to the groundskeeper's closet where they forcibly remove him from the school. To the viewer the band members are visible most of the time, but at times they appear as ghostly apparitions resembling heat-distortions, implying that the people in the school are not aware of their presence.

== Track listing ==
=== Standard edition ===
1. "Träumst du?" (feat. Marta Jandová)
2. "Träumst du? (Bounce Remix)"

=== Limited edition version ===
1. "Träumst du?" (feat. Marta Jandová)
2. "Für immer" ("Forever")
3. "Augen auf!" (live) ("Eyes Open!")
4. "Träumst du? (Bounce Remix)"
5. "Träumst du?" (video)

=== Promo version ===
1. "Träumst du?" (feat. Marta Jandová) (cut)
2. "Träumst du? (Bounce Remix)"
3. "Träumst du? ([:SITD:] Remix)"

=== Miscellaneous remixes ===
- "Träumst du? (Jan Wilms Remix)"

== Charts ==
Chart (2007)	Peak position
Austria	48
Germany	9
