= Plastik =

Studio album by Oomph!
- Released: 11 October 1999
- Recorded: 1998
- Genre: Industrial rock; industrial metal; alternative metal
- Length: 52:33
- Label: Virgin Schallplatten
- Producer: Oomph!

Oomph! chronology
Unrein (1998)	Plastik (1999)	Ego (2001)

Singles from Plastik
- 1. "Das weisse Licht" Released: 30 August 1999; 2. "Fieber" Released: 29 November 1999

Plastik (German for Plastic (das Plastik) or Sculpture (die Plastik)) is the sixth studio album by German Industrial metal band Oomph!. It was released on 11 October 1999 through the German record label Virgin Schallplatten. This album features less aggressive playing style and cleaner vocals, in compare to the band's previous albums. The album is also characterized by more pronounced synthesizer riffs, overall softer vocals and progressed drumming and guitar playing, as well as uncommon time signatures. This melody-over-aggression approach would be the style the band would adopt for their signature sound, making this album a turning point in the band's sound.

== Track listing ==
1. Das weisse Licht (The White Light) - 4:01
2. Kennst du mich? (Do You Know Me?) - 4:44
3. Scorn - 4:01
4. Keine Luft mehr (No Air Left) - 3:59
5. Hunger - 4:11
6. Nothing Is Real - 4:00
7. Mein Traum (My Dream) - 4:34
8. Always - 3:46
9. Goldenes Herz (Golden Heart) - 4:30
10. I Come Alive - 4:23
11. Fieber (featuring Nina Hagen) (Fever) - 4:13
12. My Own Private Prison - 4:13
13. Das weisse Licht (Refraction) - 1:56

== Music videos ==
- Fieber
- Das weisse Licht

== Personnel ==
Oomph!

- Dero Goi – lead vocals, drums, lyrics
- Andreas Crap – lead guitar, sampler
- Robert Flux – rhythm guitar, bass, keyboards

Additional personnel

- Jor Jenka – Management
- Next Level – Management
- Ted Jensen – Mastering
- Jan Vogtschmidt – Photography
- OOMPH! – Producer, Mixing Engineer
- Bad Words – Public Relations
- Robert Flux – Recording, Mixing
