= 10 Jahre – Best Of =

2007 greatest hits album by L'Âme Immortelle

10 Jahre - Best Of

Greatest hits album by L'Âme Immortelle
- Released: June 2007
- Recorded: 1997–2006
- Genre: Neue Deutsche Härte, alternative rock, dark wave

L'Âme Immortelle chronology
Auf deinen Schwingen (2006)	10 Jahre - Best Of (2007)

10 Jahre – Best Of is the first compilation album by L'Âme Immortelle.

== Track listing ==
1. "5 Jahre"
2. "Phönix"
3. "Nur Du"
4. "Tiefster Winter"
5. "Aus den Ruinen"
6. "Fallen Angel"
7. "Stumme Schreie"
8. "Judgement"
9. "Lass mich fallen"
10. "Du siehst mich nicht"
11. "Gefallen"
12. "Stern"
13. "Bitterkeit"
14. "Figure in the Mirror"
15. "Life Will Never Be the Same Again"
16. "Come Closer"
17. "No Tomorrow"
