= Gezeiten =

2004 studio album by L'Âme Immortelle

Studio album by L'Âme Immortelle
- Released: (France) September 20, 2004 (Germany) September 20, 2004 (United Kingdom) October 4, 2004
- Genre: Neue Deutsche Härte; Alternative rock Darkwave
- Length: 49:51
- Label: GUN / Sony BMG
- Producer: John A. Rivers; Rhys Fulber (tracks 2–4, 10)

L'Âme Immortelle chronology
| Als die Liebe starb (2003) | Gezeiten (2004) | Auf deinen Schwingen (2006) |

Gezeiten (German for Tide) is the sixth studio album from Austrian electronic music band L'Âme Immortelle. The three singles, "Fallen Angel", "5 Jahre" and "Stumme Schreie", are some of their most popular songs. Released in 2004, this was the first album to come out after the band switched labels to Supersonic/GUN.

== Track listing ==
All lyrics are written by Thomas Rainer.

| No. | Title | Music | Length |
|---|---|---|---|
| 1. | "Es zieht dich davon" | Rainer/Kraushofer | 5:26 |
| 2. | "5 Jahre" | Rainer/Kraushofer/Dayour | 4:13 |
| 3. | "Fear" | Rainer/Kraushofer/Dayour | 4:24 |
| 4. | "Stumme Schreie" | Rainer/Kraushofer/Dayour | 3:32 |
| 5. | "Fallen Angel" | Rainer/Kraushofer/Dayour | 5:03 |
| 6. | "Gezeiten" | Rainer/Kraushofer | 4:24 |
| 7. | "Rain" | Rainer/Kraushofer/Dayour | 3:38 |
| 8. | "Masquerade" | Rainer/Dayour | 3:35 |
| 9. | "Kingdom" | Rainer/Kraushofer | 5:34 |
| 10. | "Calling" | Rainer/Kraushofer/Dayour | 4:25 |
| 11. | "Ohne Dich" | Rainer/Kraushofer | 5:37 |
| 12. | "Believe in me" (Bonus track on the Limited Edition) | Rainer/Dayour | 4:26 |
| 13. | "Without you" (Bonus track on the Limited Edition) | Rainer/Kraushofer/Dayour | 4:26 |
| Total length: | | | 49:51 |

== Singles ==
- 2004 – "5 Jahre"
- 2005 – "Stumme Schreie"
- 2006 – "Fallen Angel"

== Videos ==
- "Fallen Angel"
- "5 Jahre"
- "Stumme Schreie"
