= Dann habe ich umsonst gelebt =

Studio album by L'Âme Immortelle
- Released: 2001 (EU); 2004 (US)
- Genre: EBM; Aggrotech; Darkwave
- Label: Trisol Music Group

L'Âme Immortelle chronology
Wenn der letzte Schatten fällt (1999)	Dann habe ich umsonst gelebt (2001)	Als die Liebe starb (2003)

Dann habe ich umsonst gelebt is the fourth studio album by the Austrian electronic music band L'Âme Immortelle. It is a concept album based on the thoughts of a dying man who recapitulates his life. The album's title in German language refers to the man's final question whether he has lived to no avail.

== Style ==
Unlike previous releases by L'Âme Immortelle that used only electronic sounds, this album features live instruments like guitars, bass guitars, drums, piano and string instruments. The tracks are a mix of aggressive dancefloor songs and The previously released track "Life Will Never Be the Same Again" was resampled without any electronic parts, featuring Sean Brennan of London After Midnight as a guest singer.

== Reception ==
The Sonic Seducer magazine and also Powermetal.de lauded the band's evolution from a purely electronic act towards including real instruments. Powermetal was very positive about the vocal development of singers Sonja Kraushofer and Thomas Rainer and marked that the latter now used his clear voice without any artificial effects.

The album reached position 48 in the German Media Control Charts.

== Track listing ==
All lyrics are written by Thomas Rainer.

No.	Title	Music	Length
1.	"Erinnerung"	Rainer	2:47
2.	"Judgement"	Rainer	4:12
3.	"Epitaph"	Rainer	4:14
4.	"Rearranging"	Medwenitsch	5:03
5.	"Slut"	Rainer	3:57
6.	"Umsonst Gelebt?"	Rainer	3:36
7.	"Licht und Schatten"	Medwenitsch	4:39
8.	"Voiceless"	Rainer	3:41
9.	"Was Hält Mich Noch Hier"	Rainer	4:47
10.	"Forgive Me"	Rainer	4:28
11.	"Leaving"	Medwenitsch	4:29
12.	"Dead Actor's Requiem"	Medwenitsch	2:47

Bonus track
No.	Title	Music	Length
13.	"Life Will Never Be the Same Again" (featuring Sean Brennan)	Medwenitsch	3:53

== Personnel ==
- Katrin Ebert – violin, viola
- Martin Höfert – cello
- Sonja Kraushofer – photo concept
- Hannes Medwenitsch – producer
- Thomas Rainer – vocals, producer, graphic design, cover design
- Yendri – Photography
