= Sex hat keine Macht =

Single by Oomph!

from the album Wahrheit oder Pflicht
- Released: 20 September 2004
- Recorded: 2004
- Genre: Neue Deutsche Härte; industrial metal
- Length: 18:53
- Label: Gun
- Songwriters: Rene Bachmann, Thomas Doeppner, Stephan Musiol

Oomph! singles chronology
| "Brennende Liebe" (2004) | "Sex hat keine Macht" (2004) | "Gott ist ein Popstar!" (2006) |

"Sex hat keine Macht" (German for Sex has no power) is the third single from German industrial metal group Oomph! from the album Wahrheit oder Pflicht. The song peaked at No. 31 on the German singles chart. The single version is different from the one from the Wahrheit oder Pflicht.

== Music video ==
The music video appears to be loosely based on the film The Exorcist, and begins with the band arriving at a bishop's place. Dero receives information from him, and along with Crap and Flux, goes to a house where a girl who seems to be possessed awaits. The band attempts to carry out an exorcisms on her, and it appears to have worked, but the video ends with a surprising reversal - Dero wakes up stripped and bound to a bed, in the same room with the girl.

== Standard Track Listing ==
1. "Sex hat keine Macht" (Single Version)
2. "Tausend Neue Lügen"

== Limited Track Listing ==
1. "Sex hat keine Macht" (Single Version)
2. "Tausend Neue Lügen"
3. "Sex hat keine Macht" (Transporterraum Remix)
4. "The World Is Yours"
5. "Sex hat keine Macht" (videotrack)
