= Wahrheit oder Pflicht =

Studio album by Oomph!
- Released: 8 February 2004
- Recorded: 2003
- Genre: Neue Deutsche Härte; industrial rock; industrial metal; gothic metal
- Label: BMG Imports
- Producer: Oomph!

Oomph! chronology
Ego (2001)	Wahrheit oder Pflicht (2004)	GlaubeLiebeTod (2006)

Singles from Wahrheit oder Pflicht
- 1. "Augen auf!" Released: 12 January 2004; 2. "Brennende Liebe" Released: 10 May 2004; 3. "Sex hat keine Macht" Released: 20 September 2004

Wahrheit oder Pflicht (pronounced [ˈvaːɐ̯haɪt ˌʔoːdɐ ˈpflɪçt]; German for "Truth or Dare") is the eighth studio album by the German Neue Deutsche Härte band Oomph!, released on 8 February 2004. It is the band's most commercially successful album, being their only one to achieve platinum status in Germany so far. The album was also released through Austrian record label Napalm records.

== Track listing ==
1. Augen auf! ("Eyes Open") – 3:20
2. Tausend neue Lügen ("Thousand New Lies") – 3:56
3. Wenn du weinst ("When You Cry") – 4:32
4. Sex hat keine Macht ("Sex Has No Meaning") – 4:18
5. Burn Your Eyes – 4:10 (Limited Edition Bonus Track)
6. Brennende Liebe (featuring L’âme Immortelle) ("Burning Love") – 3:48 (New Edition Bonus Track)
7. Dein Weg ("Your Way") – 3:28
8. Du spielst Gott ("You Play God") – 4:16
9. Dein Feuer ("Your Fire") – 3:48
10. Answer Me – 4:13 (Limited Edition Bonus Track)
11. Eisbär ("Polar Bear") – 4:17 (New Edition Bonus Track)
12. Der Strom ("The Stream") – 3:03
13. Nichts (ist kälter als deine Liebe) ("Nothing (Is Colder Than Your Love)") – 4:13
14. Nothing – 4:56 (Limited Edition Bonus Track)
15. Diesmal wirst du sehen ("This Time, You Will See") – 4:02
16. Tief in dir ("Deep In You") – 4:13
17. I'm Going Down – 4:33
18. Im Licht ("In the Light") – 4:09
- "Augen auf" translates literally as "Eyes Open", but the way it is used in the song ("Augen auf, ich komme"), is in the sense of a game ("Ready or not, here I come", from the game of hide-and-seek).
- The Limited and New editions had "I'm Going Down" as a hidden track, found after "Im Licht" (there is a two-minute intermission of silence).

== Personnel ==
Oomph!

- Dero Goi – lead vocals, drums
- Andreas Crap – lead guitar, keyboards
- Robert Flux – rhythm guitar, bass, sampler

== Charts ==
=== Weekly charts ===
Chart (2004)	Peak position
Austrian Albums (Ö3 Austria)	2
French Albums (SNEP)	140
German Albums (Offizielle Top 100)	2
Swiss Albums (Schweizer Hitparade)	7

=== Year-end charts ===
Chart (2004)	Position
Austrian Albums (Ö3 Austria)	64
German Albums (Offizielle Top 100)	22

== See also ==
- Truth or Dare
