= Als die Liebe starb =

Studio album by L'Âme Immortelle
- Released: 2003 (EU); 2004 (US)
- Genre: EBM; darkwave; alternative rock
- Label: Trisol Music Group

L'Âme Immortelle chronology
| Dann habe ich umsonst gelebt (2001) | Als die Liebe starb (2003) | Gezeiten (2004) |

Als die Liebe starb is the fifth studio album from Austrian electronic music band L'Âme Immortelle.

== Track listing ==
All lyrics are written by Thomas Rainer.

| No. | Title | Music | Length |
|---|---|---|---|
| 1. | "21. Februar" | Rainer/Kraushofer/Dayour | 3:59 |
| 2. | "Tiefster Winter" | Rainer/Kraushofer/Dayour | 5:00 |
| 3. | "Have I Ever?" | Rainer/Kraushofer/Dayour | 4:53 |
| 4. | "Letting Go" | Rainer/Kraushofer/Dayour | 5:46 |
| 5. | "Aus den Ruinen" | Rainer/Kraushofer/Dayour | 5:07 |
| 6. | "Certainty" | Rainer/Kraushofer/Dayour | 4:13 |
| 7. | "Lake of Tears" | Medwenitsch/Kraushofer | 4:35 |
| 8. | "Betrayal" | Rainer/Kraushofer/Dayour | 4:25 |
| 9. | "Im Tod Vereint" | Rainer/Kraushofer/Dayour | 4:47 |
| 10. | "Disharmony" | Medwenitsch/Kraushofer | 5:12 |

=== Re-release bonus tracks ===
11. "Why Didn't I Die"
12. "Just Defy"
