= Gott ist ein Popstar =

Single by Oomph!

from the album GlaubeLiebeTod
- Released: 24 February 2006
- Recorded: 2006
- Genre: Neue Deutsche Härte; industrial metal
- Length: 3:55
- Label: Gun
- Songwriters: Rene Bachmann, Thomas Doeppner, Stephan Musiol

Oomph! singles chronology
"Sex hat keine Macht" (2004)	"Gott ist ein Popstar" (2006)	"Das letzte Streichholz" (2006)

"Gott ist ein Popstar" (German for "God is a pop star") is a song by German rock band Oomph! and the first single from their 2006 album GlaubeLiebeTod.

== Music and lyrics ==
The song was written by Dero, Crap, and Flux, with Dero alone writing the lyrics. The song is in the key of F♯ minor at a tempo of 123 bpm. The verses of the song are an excerpt from the Lord's Prayer in German, followed by a bastardization in the second verse. For example, the second line "Geheilgt werde dein Name" (Hallowed be thy name), becomes "Geheiligt werde die Lüge" (Hallowed be the lie). The chorus of the song features repeated chants of "Gott ist ein Popstar!" followed by lines likening religion to a stage show. In order to rhyme better, two of the chorus lines were rewritten for the English version "God is a Popstar" on the Truth or Dare album, rather than being a simple German translation. "Der Applaus ist groß" (The applause is great), became "Hear the screaming crowd," and "Ihm gehört die Welt" (The world belongs to him), became "Master of it all."

== Video ==
The music video starts with the band pulling up to what appears to be a depiction of Jesus Christ in a back alley. They take the Messiah and transform him into a young and sexy pop idol. The end of the video ends with a bloodied popstar version of Jesus being revived in the same alley where he was in the beginning of the video. Dero, the singer, is shown as a depiction of the Grim Reaper.

== Controversy ==
After its release, the song caused a great deal of controversy and negative criticism from religious groups who condemned the song as heretical. The band's performance at the 2006 ECHO Awards was canceled due to the questionable nature of the song, and many radio stations throughout Germany boycotted the track.

However, the band responded to these claims, by stating that the song is about hypocrisy in modern organized religion and was not intended to be heretical.

== Track listing ==
CD Single

1. "Gott ist ein Popstar"
2. "Ich will deine Seele" ("I Want Your Soul")

CD Maxi

1. "Gott ist ein Popstar"
2. "Ich will deine Seele" ("I Want Your Soul")
3. "Weißt du wie viel Sterne stehen" ("Do you know how many stars there are?")
4. "Fragment"
5. "Gott ist ein Popstar! (Transporterraum Mix)"

== Download-only remixes ==
- "Gott ist ein Popstar (Sunwater Dirty Remix)"
- "Gott ist ein Popstar (Principal Alternative Remix)"
- "Gott ist ein Popstar (Silverstar Remix)"
- "Gott ist ein Popstar (Beichtstuhl Remix)"

== Charts ==
Country	Chart position (2006)
Austria	14
Germany	12
Switzerland	93
