= Whispers in the Shadow =

Gothic rock band from Austria

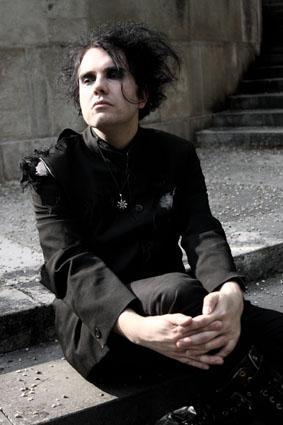
- Ashley Dayour

Background information
- Origin: Vienna, Austria
- Genres: Gothic rock; post-punk; alternative rock
- Years active: 1996–present
- Labels: Solar Lodge / Alive, Echozone / BMG
- Members: Ashley Dayour; Fork; Martin Acid; Alexander Kühmayer
- Past members: Sebastian Adam Richard Lederer Francis Markus Houben Max Lambert Siggi Meier Curt Benes Reinhard Schwarzinger

Whispers in the Shadow is a gothic rock band from Austria, formed in 1996. The band's name is inspired by the story The Whisperer in Darkness by H. P. Lovecraft. The lyrics deal mainly with occult and mystic concepts.

== History ==
Whispers in the Shadow was formed as a solo project by Ashley Dayour (vocals, guitars, also known as guitarist for L'Âme Immortelle & Veneno para las Hadas) in 1996.

They soon developed into a full lineup and released their first album, Laudanum in 1997 followed by their second album November in 1999. These two albums are heavily influenced by the sound of The Cure's early recordings such as Pornography.

In 2000, they released the third album A Taste of Decay which was a departure into a more rock oriented sound. This was followed a year later by Permanent Illusions which was very much far from the gothic rock origins of the band. Psychedelic and progressive rock bands such as Pink Floyd had a major influence on the sound of this record.

After touring all over Europe in 2001, they released their first live album called Everything You Knew Was Wrong in 2003, but several lineup and record label changes forced them to take a break.

Whispers in the Shadow returned in 2007 with the live album A-Cold-Night followed by the re-releases of their first two albums Laudanum and November, remastered with new cover artwork and unreleased bonus tracks.

In 2008, they released their fifth studio album called Into the Arms of Chaos. This album can be seen as a new beginning and was produced by John A. Rivers at Woodbine Street Recording Studios. He also worked with bands such as The Chameleons, Clan of Xymox, Love and Rockets, Dead Can Dance and Sopor Aeternus and created a more harsh and powerful but still dark and psychedelic sound, which was described by the press as "Goth-Floyd", a mixture of the traditional gothic rock sound like Fields of the Nephilim with the soundscapes of Pink Floyd.

In 2010, they released The Eternal Arcane, the second part of a 4-piece cycle about the occult concept of alchemy.

In 2011, a live DVD called Searching for Light was released. The band then toured with Vendemmian and Merciful Nuns throughout Europe. In April 2011, they released a 6-track EP, The Lightbringer which includes a cover version of the Leonard Cohen classic "First We Take Manhattan" as well as other unreleased tracks. The main theme of the EP is the fall of the archangel Lucifer. The lyrics are inspired by chaos magic and occult writers such as Austin Osman Spare, Aleister Crowley, Dion Fortune, Kenneth Grant, as well as writers from the Weird Fiction genre like Algernon Blackwood, Arthur Machen and the Cthulhu Mythos by H. P. Lovecraft.

2012 marked the release of their self-produced seventh studio album, which is the third part of the ongoing conceptual cycle, The Rites of Passage, and 2014 marked the release of their eighth studio album, the fourth and final part of the cycle, Beyond the Cycles of Time.

In 2018, the band released their ninth studio album The Urgency of Now and released their tenth album Yesterday Is Forever in 2020.

== Discography ==
=== Studio albums ===
- Laudanum (1997)
- November (1999)
- A Taste of Decay (2000)
- Permanent Illusions (2001)
- Into the Arms of Chaos (How to Steal the Fire from Heaven) (2008; limited edition came with 70 minute DVD including 2008 live concert)
- The Eternal Arcane (2010)
- The Rites of Passage (2012)
- Beyond the Cycles of Time (2014)
- The Urgency of Now (2018)
- Yesterday Is Forever (2020)
- Ghosts (2023)
- Rapture (2025)

=== Extended plays ===
- Autumn Leaves and Trippy Dreams (2000; live EP)
- The Lightbringer (2011; plus limited bonus EP Music for Rituals Vol. I - The Babalon Workings)

=== Compilation albums ===
- Descent (1996; demo tape)
- Borrowed Nightmares and Forgotten Dreams: The Remixed, the Reworked and the Abandoned (2009)
- Gilding The Lily - A Retrospective 1996-2021 (2021; best of compilation new versions and mixes)

=== Live albums ===
- Everything You Knew was Wrong (2003; double album)
- A Cold Night (2007; live in Vienna, 25.10.2006)
- Searching for Light (2011; live DVD)
- If Wormwood Falls (2012; live in Berlin 29.09.2012)
