= Auf deinen Schwingen =

Studio album by L'Âme Immortelle
- Released: August 2006 (UK)
- Genre: Neue Deutsche Härte; Alternative rock Darkwave
- Length: 59:29
- Label: GUN Records / Sony BMG
- Producer: L'Âme Immortelle; Bernd Mazagg; Johnnie Lee Michaels

L'Âme Immortelle chronology
| Gezeiten (2004) | Auf deinen Schwingen (2006) | Namenlos (2008) |

Auf deinen Schwingen is the seventh studio album from Austrian band L'Âme Immortelle.

== Track listing ==
| No. | Title | Lyrics | Music | Length |
|---|---|---|---|---|
| 1. | "Auf Deinen Schwingen" | Rainer | Rainer/Kraushofer | 3:37 |
| 2. | "Herzschlag" | Rainer | Rainer/Kraushofer | 3:34 |
| 3. | "Du siehst mich nicht" | Rainer | Rainer | 3:55 |
| 4. | "Nur Du" | Rainer | Rainer/Kraushofer | 3:19 |
| 5. | "Phönix" | Rainer | Rainer/Kraushofer | 4:07 |
| 6. | "Destiny" | Rainer | Rainer/Kraushofer | 4:29 |
| 7. | "Sometimes Love Is Not Enough" | Rainer | Rainer/Kraushofer | 4:21 |
| 8. | "Run Away" | Rainer | Rainer | 4:13 |
| 9. | "Wohin" | Rainer | Rainer/Kraushofer | 3:56 |
| 10. | "In Dein Leben" | Rainer | Rainer/Kraushofer | 3:28 |
| 11. | "Last Will" | Rainer | Rainer/Kraushofer | 4:10 |
| 12. | "Der Letzte Akt" | Rainer | Rainer/Kraushofer | 5:04 |
| 13. | "Bis ans Ende der Zeit" (Bonus track on the Limited Edition) | Rainer | Rainer/Kraushofer | 4:26 |
| 14. | "Dying Day" (Bonus track on the Limited Edition) | Rainer | Rainer | 4:07 |
| 15. | "Dein Herz" | Marc Sieper | Simon Bertling/Christian Hagitte | 3:36 |
| Total length: | | | | 59:52 |
