= L'Âme Immortelle =

Austrian darkwave duo

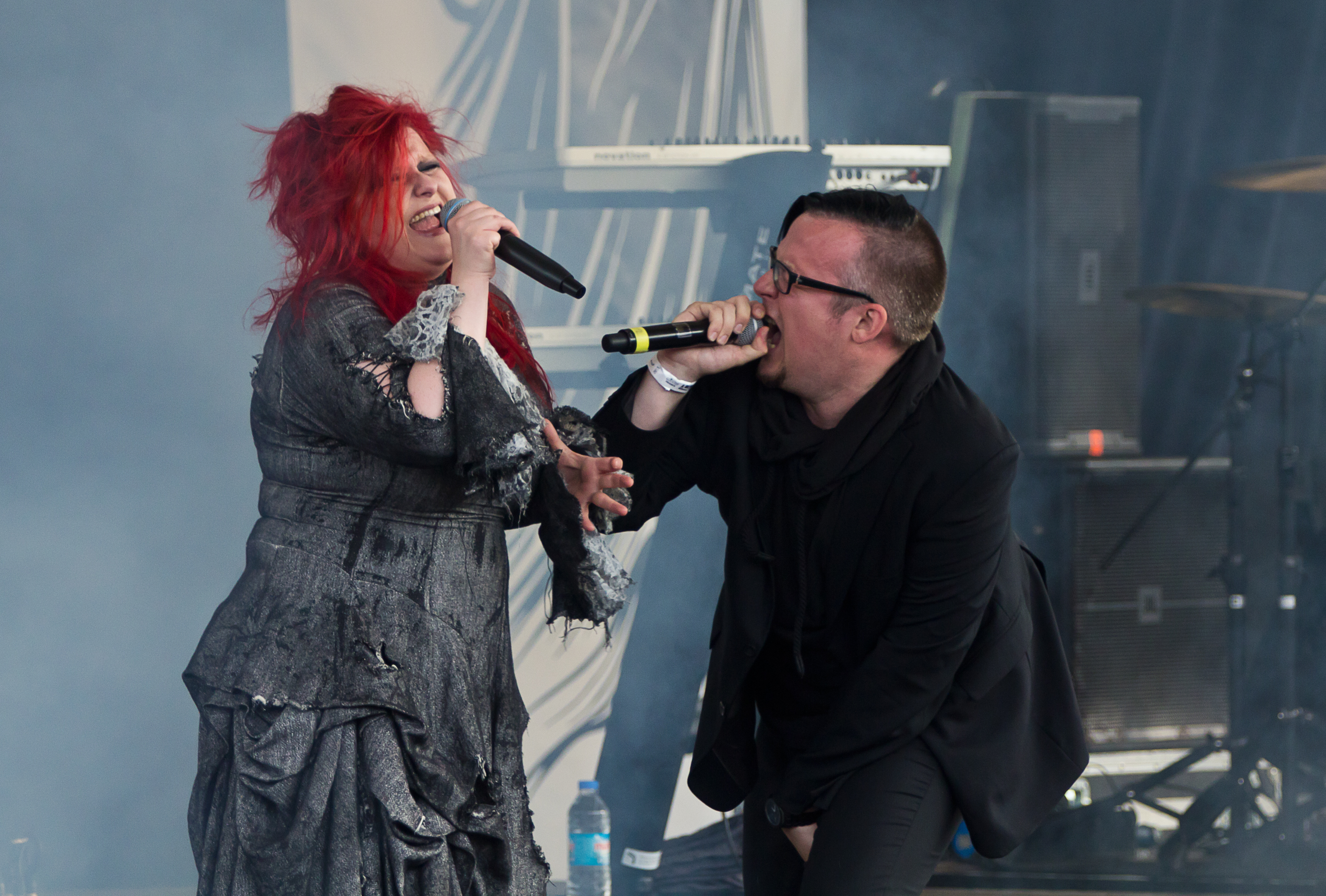
- L'Âme Immortelle performing in 2015

Background information
- Origin: Vienna, Austria
- Genres: Darkwave, dark electro, electro-pop
- Years active: 1996–present
- Label: MOS/Supersonic/Trisol
- Members: Thomas Rainer (vocals, keyboards); Sonja Kraushofer (vocals)
- Website: lameimmortelle.com

L'Âme Immortelle (French for "the immortal soul") is an Austrian darkwave duo formed in 1996. Many of L'Âme Immortelle's songs feature melancholy or lovelorn lyrics in German or English, and juxtaposed harsh male and emotional female vocals. In 2004 they switched label to the now defunct Supersonic Records (a subsidiary of Sony BMG) and their work moved away from the band's electronic roots to the heavier Neue Deutsche Härte (New German hardness) genre. In 2008 they went back to their former label Trisol and they returned to their musical roots.

== History ==
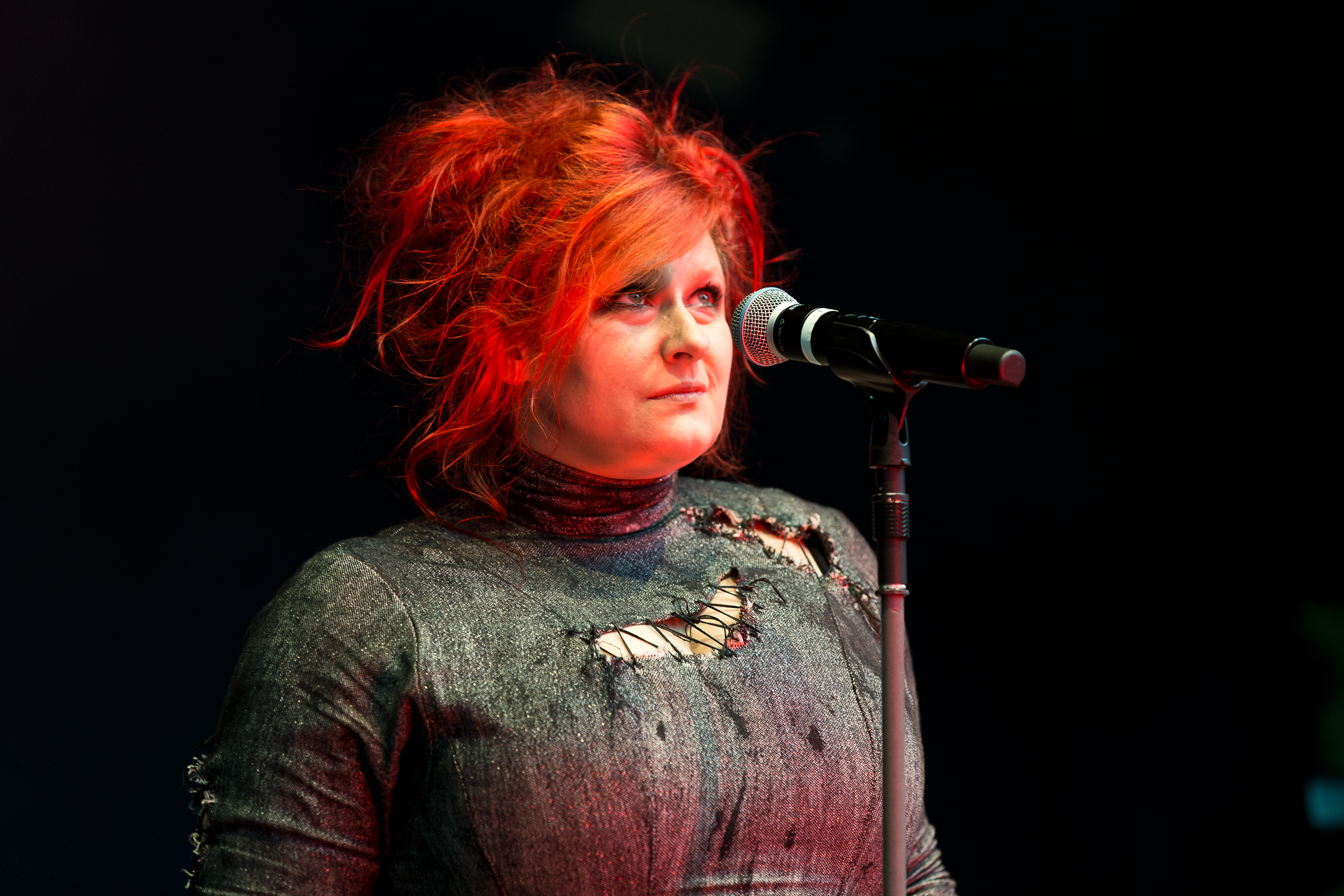
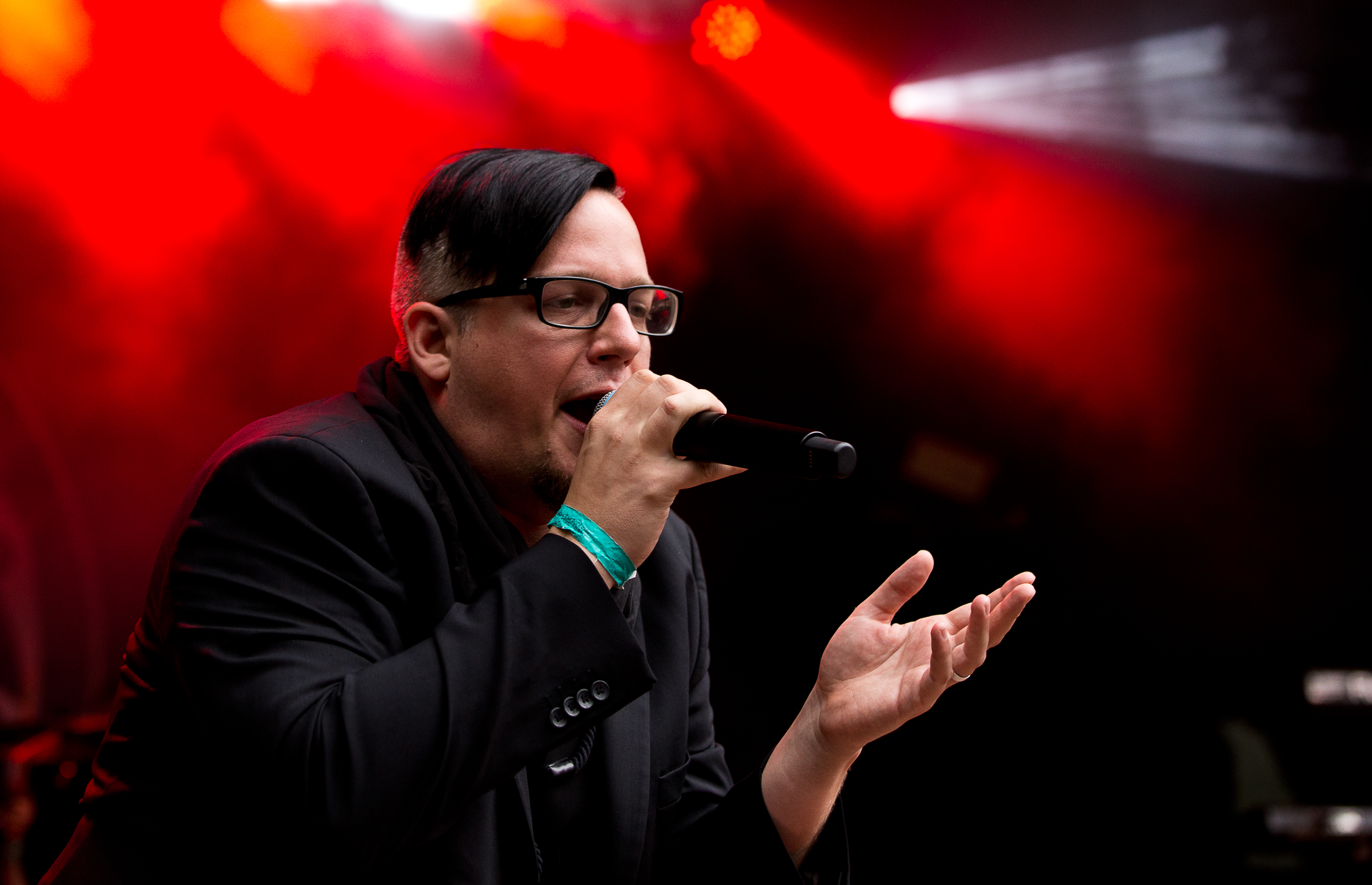
Sonja Kraushofer and Thomas Rainer at Nocturnal Culture Night festival 2016

=== Founding ===
L'Âme Immortelle was formed in 1996 in Austria by friends Thomas Rainer and Hannes Medwenitsch. Soon vocalist Sonja Kraushofer, a former classmate of Rainer, joined and the band sought a record contract. They released their first album, Lieder die wie Wunden bluten, in 1997 on MOS Records in Liechtenstein, which became popular in the underground German dark culture.

=== Trisol Records ===
In 1999, L'Âme Immortelle switched to Trisol Records (part of Trisol Music Group GmbH). From 1998 through 2001, L'Âme Immortelle released another LP yearly, each bringing the band greater popularity. In 2002, Medwenitsch left the band Kraushofer and Rainer recruited Ashley Dayour (from the Austrian band Whispers in the Shadow) as a guitarist and the re-formed L'Âme Immortelle released a new single, Tiefster Winter in November 2002. In 2003, L'Âme Immortelle released Als die Liebe starb, as well as Seelensturm, a collection of re-issued and re-mixed early material.

=== Supersonic Records ===
In 2004, the band switched labels again, this time to major label Supersonic, a subsidiary of Sony BMG Music Entertainment. The first issue following the switch was a collaboration with Oomph! on the initially non-album (it was later inlided on a re-edition of the album Wahrheit oder Pflicht) single "Brennende Liebe" (released as Oomph! feat. L'Âme Immortelle); they also appeared in the video. Following that, L'Âme Immortelle released a new album, Gezeiten, which includes some of their most popular songs like "5 Jahre", "Stumme Schreie" and "Fallen Angel". A significant change in L'Âme Immortelle's style is evident now that the band is on a major label, notably the electronic instrumentation of earlier work was less prominent in Gezeiten.

Their eighth album Auf deinen Schwingen was released in August 2006 along with the single "Phönix". The record also includes songs like "Wohin" which contains text from another famous LAI song "Aus den Ruinen", and "Nur Du"—a song which totally differs from older L'Âme Immortelle works. The music video for this song is a cartoon, an unusual thing for the band.

Out since 22 June on Gun Supersonic is LAI's 10 year retrospective best-of album 10 Jahre. 10 Jahre presents the highlights of their career with hit tracks and fan favourites taken from each of their albums. This release also includes two brand new exclusive tracks,"Let Me Fall" and "Come Closer".

=== Return to Trisol ===
In December 2007, Trisol Records announced that L'Âme Immortelle had returned to the Trisol label to release a new album, Namenlos. Released 1 January 2008, Namenlos is a two-CD double-album. Trisol's press release denied that the band's label switch was motivated by poor performance of its last Supersonic album Auf deinen Schwingen, but hinted that the band was returning to its pre-Supersonic style.

On 18 November 2011, the band announced 27 January 2012 as the release date for their tenth studio album Momente. On 27 April 2012, a new album, Fragmente, featuring remixed versions of 10 songs from Momente (five by Rainer, five by Kraushofer) was released

== Solo projects ==
In 2000, Thomas Rainer released the first album, Gesellschaft:Mord, for his side project with Joachim Sobczak, Siechtum. The following two albums were Diagnose:Zeit and Kreuz:X:Feuer, which featured remixes by God Module and Megadump.

In 2007, Thomas Rainer released his debut album under the Nachtmahr moniker. The first release for this electro/industrial project was titled "Kunst ist Krieg". In 2008, the second album, titled "Feuer frei!", was released.

Persephone, a.k.a. Sonja Kraushofer, returns with a fourth album. After the Trisol release "Home" (2002), "Atma Gyan" (2004) and "Mera Sangeet Kho Gaya" (2004), "Letters to a Stranger" is to be released on the Curzweyhl label.

Ashley Dayour, the long term guitarist of the band, released several records with his other band, Whispers in the Shadow. The last one was "Yesterday Is Forever" in 2020.

== Discography ==
=== Studio albums ===
Year	Title	Peak positions	
Year	Title	AUT	GER
1997	Lieder die wie Wunden bluten	—	—
1998	...In einer Zukunft aus Tränen und Stahl	—	—
1999	Wenn der letzte Schatten fällt	—	—
2001	Dann habe ich umsonst gelebt	—	48
2003	Als die Liebe starb	—	38
2004	Gezeiten	—	16
2006	Auf deinen Schwingen	—	45
January 2008	Namenlos	—	39
August 2008	Durch fremde Hand	—	—
January 2012	Momente	—	62
April 2012	Fragmente	—	—
November 2014	Drahtseilakt	—	—
January 2018	Hinter dem Horizont	—	36
January 2022	In tiefem Fall	—	33
January 2024	Ungelebte Leben	—	—

=== Compilation albums ===
- Seelensturm (2003)
- 10 Jahre – Best Of (June 2007)
- Best of Indie Years (May 2008)
- Unsterblich - 20 Jahre L'ame Immortelle (February 2016)
- Letztes Licht (January 2019)

=== Singles ===
Year	Title	Album	Peak positions		
Year	Title	Album	AUT	GER	SWI
2000	"Epitaph"	Dann Habe Ich Umsonst Gelebt	—	—	—
2001	"Judgement"	Dann Habe Ich Umsonst Gelebt	—	—	—
2002	"Tiefster Winter"	Als Die Liebe Starb	—	—	—
2004	"Brennende Liebe" (Oomph! feat. L'Âme Immortelle)	Wahrheit oder Pflicht	11	6	35
2004	"5 Jahre"	Gezeiten	—	26	—
2004	"Stumme Schreie"	Gezeiten	—	47	—
2005	"Fallen Angel"	Gezeiten	—	47	—
2006	"Dein Herz"	Auf deinen Schwingen	—	70	—
2006	"Phönix"	Auf deinen Schwingen	—	—	—
2006	"Nur du"	Auf deinen Schwingen	—	66	—
2008	"Es tut mir leid"	Namenlos	—	—	—
2008	"1000 Voices/Bleib - DJ-Single"	Namenlos	—	—	—
2012	"Absolution"	Momente	—	—	—
2012	"Banish"	Momente	—	—	—

=== DVD ===
- Disharmony – Live! (2003)
- Jenseits der Schatten (2008)
