= Durch fremde Hand =

Durch Fremde Hand

Studio album by L'Âme Immortelle
- Released: 25 July 2008
- Genre: Alternative rock, industrial, darkwave
- Label: Trisol Music Group
- Producer: L'Âme Immortelle

L'Âme Immortelle chronology
Best of Indie Years (2008)	Durch Fremde Hand (2008)

Durch fremde Hand is the ninth studio album by L'Âme Immortelle. The album is featured on two CDs and is the twin album of the band's previous studio album, Namenlos. The first disc contains remix versions of the songs on the first disc of Namenlos. A limited edition digipack, limited to 2,000 copies worldwide, was also released containing a 28-page booklet featuring artwork and song lyrics.

== Track listing ==
- Disc 1
1. "Vergessen" (Die Namenlosen von Berlin by Üebermutter) – (2:15)
2. "1000 Voices" (Echoes of a Thousand Voices Covered by ASP) – (5:10)
3. "Behind the Light" (Beautiful Light Remix by Bella Donna) – (4:11)
4. "Bleib" (Plastic Remix by Dope Stars Inc.) – (3:55)
5. "Requiem" (Satya Yuga Remix by Affentanz) – (4:30)
6. "Lost" (Pin-Up Remix by XPQ-21) – (3:02)
7. "Blutrot" (Quiet Heart Remix by Necessary Response) – (4:45)
8. "Reborn" (Hardcore Remix by Las Vegas 909) – (5:33)
9. "Es Tut Mir Leid" (Entschuldigung Remix by Grendel) – (5:04)
10. "Niemals" (Club Remix by Wynardtage) – (4:54)
11. "Jenseits der Schatten" (Void Remix by Monozelle) – (4:52)
12. "The Cleansing" (Voidian Cleansing Remix by Beyond the Void) – (3:42)
13. "Namenlos" (Drifting Downwards Remix by Perfidious Words) – (5:31)
- Disc 2
1. Ophelia – (1:55)
2. Ein Blick Zurück – (4:12)
3. Suffocating Endlessly – (4:20)
4. Now You’re Gone – (3:53)
5. Durch Fremde Hand – (4:29)
6. Das Kühle Grab – (2:53)
