= Gekreuzigt =

Single by Oomph!

from the album Unrein
- Released: 26 January 1998
- Recorded: 1997
- Genre: Neue Deutsche Härte; industrial metal
- Length: 27:26
- Label: Virgin Schallplatten
- Songwriters: Andreas Crap, Robert Flux, Stephan Musiol

Oomph! singles chronology
| "Ice-Coffin" (1995) | "Gekreuzigt" (1998) | "Unsere Rettung" (1998) |

"Gekreuzigt" (German for "Crucified") is the first single from the album Unrein by German rock band Oomph!. The single has also been released in a special form of a metal box. The song has been re-recorded for the Oomph! compilation Delikatessen.

== Standard track listing ==
1. "Gekreuzigt (Single Version)"
2. "Gekreuzigt (Naghavi Mix)"
3. "Gekreuzigt (Jelly & Fish Edit Mix)"
4. "Gekreuzigt (Haujobb Mix)"

== Limited track listing ==
1. "Gekreuzigt (Single Version)"
2. "Gekreuzigt (Naghavi Mix)"
3. "Gekreuzigt (Jelly & Fish Extended Mix)"
4. "Gekreuzigt (Haujobb Mix)"
5. "Gekreuzigt (Myer Mix)"

== Charts ==
| Chart (1998) | Peak position |
|---|---|
| Germany (GfK) | 81 |
