= XXV (Oomph! album) =

Studio album by Oomph!
- Released: 31 July 2015
- Recorded: 2014
- Genre: Neue Deutsche Härte
- Length: 54:39
- Label: Universal Music
- Producer: Oomph!

Oomph! chronology
Des Wahnsinns fette Beute (2012)	XXV (2015)	Ritual (2019)

Singles from XXV
- 1. "Alles aus Liebe" Released: 17 July 2015

XXV is the twelfth studio album from the German Neue Deutsche Härte band Oomph!. It was released on 31 July 2015 by record label Universal Music.

== Track listing ==
No.	Title	English Translation	Length
1.	"Dein Retter"	Your Savior	2:54
2.	"Alles aus Liebe"	All for Love	3:39
3.	"Jetzt oder nie"	Now or Never	3:44
4.	"Als wärs das letzte Mal"	As If It Was the Last Time	3:31
5.	"Mary Bell"		5:16
6.	"Jede Reise hat ein Ende"	Every Journey Has an End	4:04
7.	"Unter diesem Mond"	Below This Moon	4:11
8.	"All deine Wunden"	All Your Wounds	4:02
9.	"Fleisch und Fell"	Flesh and Fur	4:27
10.	"Tick Tack"	Tick Tock	4:25
11.	"Nicht von dieser Welt"	Not of this world	3:51
12.	"Spieler"	Player	3:30
13.	"Zielscheibe"	Target	3:11
14.	"Leis ganz leis"	Quietly All Quietly	3:54
Total length:			54:39

== Music videos ==
- Alles aus Liebe (31 July 2015)

== Charts ==
Chart (2015)	Peak position
Austrian Albums (Ö3 Austria)	42
German Albums (Offizielle Top 100)	10
Swiss Albums (Schweizer Hitparade)	59
