= Augen auf! =

2004 single by Oomph!

Single by Oomph!

from the album Wahrheit oder Pflicht
- Language: German
- English title: "Eyes Open!"
- Released: 12 January 2004
- Genre: Neue Deutsche Härte
- Length: 3:20
- Label: Supersonic, GUN
- Songwriter(s): Rene Bachmann, Thomas Doeppner, Stephan Musiol, Maik Straatmann, Marek Vejvoda, Oliver Woidt
- Producer(s): Oomph!

Oomph! singles chronology
"Niemand" (2001)	"Augen auf!" (2004)	"Brennende Liebe" (2004)

"Augen auf!" (English: "Eyes Open!") is the first single from the German industrial metal group Oomph!'s album Wahrheit oder Pflicht, and their first released under the GUN label. It is often considered the best-known Oomph! song and brought the band commercial success. The song topped the German Singles Chart for five weeks and the Austrian Singles Chart for four weeks. "Augen auf!" was certified gold in both countries. "Augen auf" translates literally as "Eyes Open", but the way it is used in the song ("Augen auf, ich komme"), is in the sense of a game ("Ready or not, here I come", from the game of hide-and-seek).

A version of the song with English lyrics was featured on the compilation album Truth or Dare in 2010, under the new title "Ready or Not (I'm Coming)." The song featured slightly altered lyrics instead of being a direct German-to-English translation. It was featured on the soundtrack for the video game FIFA 2005

== Music video ==
The videoclip for "Augen auf!" begins with two children aged around six or seven years old walking down a deserted path together. The girl turns to look at someone or something coming up behind them, while her male companion seems oblivious. It is then revealed that the pair are heading to a birthday party, presumably for a boy of around the same age. All of the young guests seem apathetic and uninterested in the attempts of present adults to create a light party mood. When the birthday boy's mother places a cake in front of him, he simply glares at her and her bright smile falters. None of the children eat or touch their cake, and when one boy picks up his spoon as though to eat, the birthday boy shakes his head disapprovingly and the other boy quickly drops his spoon.

At this point, lead singer Dero enters disguised as a clown, although with no bright or colorful makeup, rather black lipstick and eyeliner and black clothing with a priest's collar. He smirks briefly at twin girls by the doorway and the twins' eyes flash black for a moment. He then proceeds to perform magic tricks for the party guests, however the tricks are not particularly astounding and rather this sequence features him with a handkerchief in his mouth, smiling demonically at the children whilst the adults applaud enthusiastically. Dero continues to smile freakishly as he gestures for the birthday boy's mother to come closer. He blindfolds her and spins her in a circle, much like she were about to play Blind man's bluff or a similar game. The boy's mother begins to walk forwards into the small crowd of children, who are watching her. Trying to feel her way with her hands outstretched, the mother wanders into a small windowless cell, where her son is standing. He is holding a small gift-wrapped box, perhaps one of his birthday gifts. His mother removes her blindfold and her eyes widen in fear at the sight of her son standing there. What happens to her from then is unknown, however there is a short split-second shot of her hand limply dropping the blindfold she was holding.

The next shot shows a young boy sitting underneath a staircase, perhaps in a basement or cellar. He has his hands over his eyes and appears to be counting for the game hide-and-seek. From here, there are a number of random shots of the children from the party smiling evilly, and one shot includes the girl from the beginning holding a knife behind her back whilst the piano behind her appears to be playing itself. There is a short shot of Dero in his clown costume standing amongst the children in the small cell the birthday boy had lured his mother into earlier. He has his arms outstretched over the children and is smiling insanely, implying that he controls the children.

Throughout the entire video, shots are shown of the band playing in an underground, windowless location which is unknown. Dero is wearing a priest's suit and singing while Crap and Flux play guitar beside him. Leo drums in the background as a stand-in for Dero, who normally drums for the band. The final shot is of the entire band standing motionless and stiff while an unknown man pulls a plastic dust cover over them.

The music video is partially inspired by Stanley Kubrick's The Shining based on Stephen King's book of the same name.

== Track listings ==
German CD single

1. "Augen auf!" – 3:23
2. "Dein Feuer" – 3:46
3. "Augen auf!" (Freizeichen vs. Oomph!-Mix) – 4:34

German limited-edition EP

1. "Augen auf!" – 3:23
2. "Dein Feuer" – 3:46
3. "Burn Your Eyes" – 4:12
4. "Eisbär" – 3:59
5. "Augen auf!" (Freizeichen vs. Oomph!-Mix) – 4:34
6. "Augen auf!" (video)

== "Ready or Not (I'm Coming)" ==
The song's vocals were re-recorded in English for the band's Truth or Dare compilation album, released on 26 February 2010, which features slightly altered lyrics instead of being a direct German-to-English translation. The song's title was also changed from the literal translation "Eyes Open!", to "Ready or Not (I'm Coming)" to fit the new lyrics.

== Charts ==
=== Weekly charts ===
Chart (2004)	Peak position
Austria (Ö3 Austria Top 40)	1
Europe (Eurochart Hot 100)	8
Germany (GfK)	1
Switzerland (Schweizer Hitparade)	21

=== Year-end charts ===
Chart (2004)	Position
Austria (Ö3 Austria Top 40)	6
Germany (Media Control GfK)	7

=== Decade-end charts ===
Chart (2000–2009)	Position
Germany (Media Control GfK)	61

== Certifications ==
Region	Certification	Certified units/sales
Austria (IFPI Austria)	Gold	15,000^{*}
Germany (BVMI)	Gold	150,000^{^}
^{*} Sales figures based on certification alone.^{^} Shipments figures based on certification alone.
