= Oomph! =

German rock band

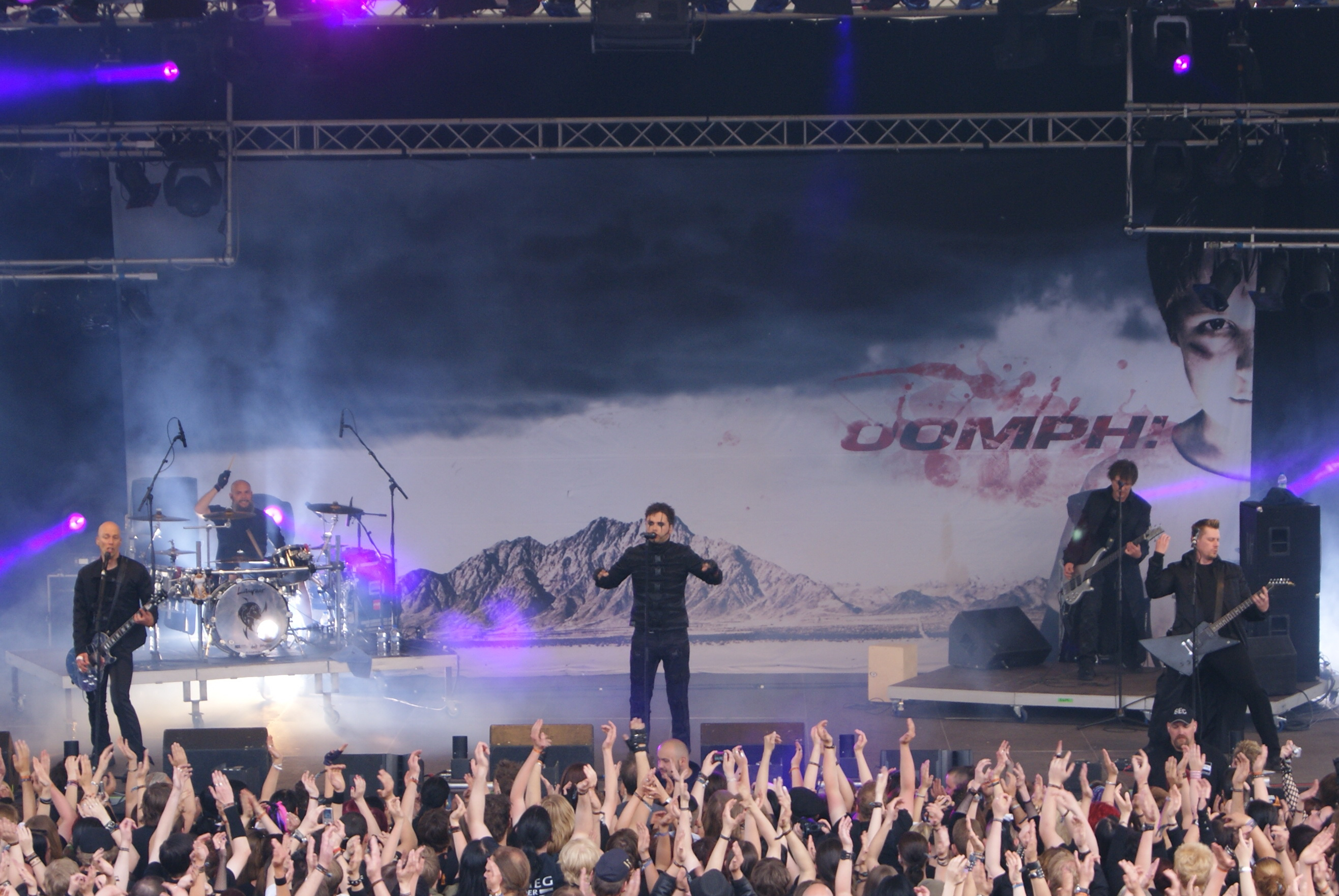
- Oomph! performing in 2010 at Blackfield Festival

Background information
- Origin: Wolfsburg, West Germany
- Genres: Neue Deutsche Härte; industrial metal; EBM (early)
- Years active: 1989–present
- Labels: GUN; Columbia; Sony BMG; Napalm; Machinery
- Members: Der Schulz; Crap; Flux
- Past members: Dero Goi
- Website: Official website

Oomph! is a German rock band from Wolfsburg, formed in 1989. The band pioneered the Neue Deutsche Härte movement. Their work contains lyrics in both English and German, with a shift towards German exclusively on recent albums (all works from GlaubeLiebeTod onwards are entirely in German).

== History ==
=== Early years (1989–2002) ===
Oomph! incorporated many styles of music such as metal, industrial, alternative rock, electronica and gothic to create their sound. Their style changed between their self-titled debut, Oomph! (1992), and its successor Sperm (1994). Though they started with very much a dance-laden industrial sound, they quickly moved to a much more heavily guitar-driven metal sound, while still acknowledging their electronic roots. This guitar-driven and electronic accompanied sound inspired numerous musicians, most famously Rammstein, Megaherz, and Eisbrecher, to follow their lead.

Oomph! was signed on Virgin Schallplatten between 1998 and 2001, where they released three albums; the first, Unrein, was released in 1998, which became their debut album on the German Media Control Charts, peaking at No. 37, and the Austrian top 40 at No. 38. A single called "Gekreuzigt" was released in 1998 to promote Unrein and became the band's debut single on the German charts, peaking at No. 81.

The second Virgin album, Plastik, was released in 1999 and peaked in Germany at No. 23. The third, Ego, was released in 2001, peaking at No. 21 on the Media Control Charts. This fulfilled their contract with Virgin; the band did not continue with the record company, feeling that it never fully explored their potential. With the benefits of major-label status, Oomph! gained a larger following and toured with labelmates Skunk Anansie in 1999, later opening for Finnish rock band HIM in fall 2001. Tobias "Tobi" Gloge, their first live bassist, was exchanged for Hagen Gödicke in 2002.

In 2002, Oomph! played at the Ozzfest in Germany, alongside Black Label Society, Tool and Ozzy Osbourne on 20 May. The band appeared at the With Full Force Festival on 5 July 2002. On 19 December 2002, Oomph! opened for Apoptygma Berzerk.

=== Wahrheit oder Pflicht and GlaubeLiebeTod (2004–2007) ===
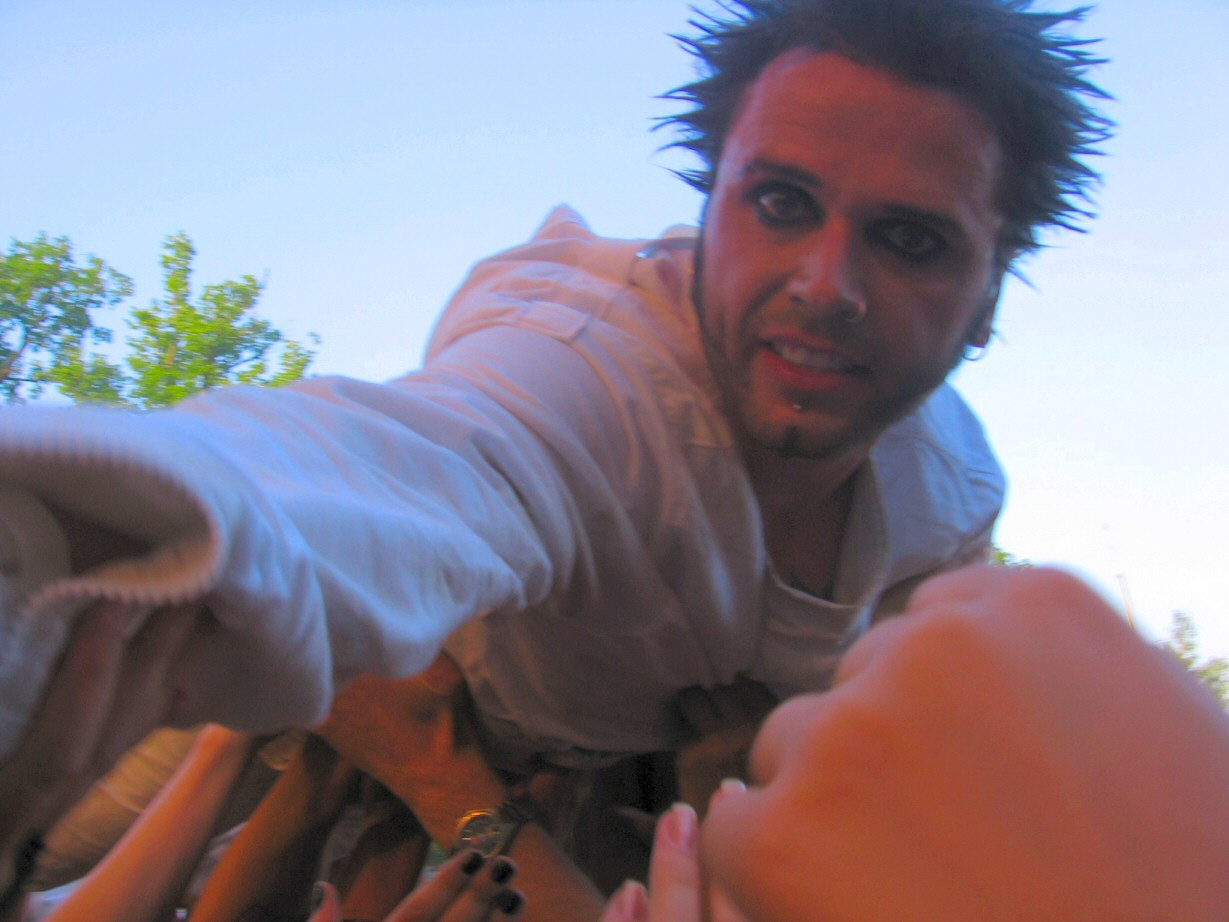
Longtime frontman Dero Goi in 2006

In 2004, Oomph! released their first single, "Augen auf!" ("Open your eyes!"), from their eighth album Wahrheit oder Pflicht on a new label, this time on Supersonic Records, part of the Sony BMG group of music companies. It marks their first number one hit in Germany, eventually bringing forth their major commercial breakthrough. The album hit No. 2 on the Media Control Charts.

In June 2004, Oomph! played at two major European music festivals: the Dynamo Open Air Festival on 5 June in the Netherlands, and on 25 June at the Graspop Metal Meeting in Belgium.

"Augen auf!" became part of the FIFA Football 2005 soundtrack. Oomph! appeared for the first time at Wacken Open Air on 4 August 2005.

The band's ninth album, GlaubeLiebeTod ("FaithLoveDeath"), was released in March 2006, including the controversial single "Gott ist ein Popstar" ("God is a popstar"), its follow-up "Das letzte Streichholz", "Die Schlinge", and "Träumst du?".

In August 2006, Virgin released the compilation album 1998–2001: Best of Virgin Years. It contains tracks from Oomph!'s three Virgin albums as well as a few unreleased tracks. The band distanced itself from this best-of release and asked that fans not buy it, as the band's current label GUN had scheduled a best-of compilation as well.

On 15 June 2006, Oomph! played at the Nova Rock Festival in Austria.

On 1 December 2006, Oomph!'s official best-of album, Delikatessen (Delicacies) was released under the GUN label. The songs on it were hand-picked by the band itself. It contains tracks from all nine Oomph! albums, B-sides, remixes, and new tracks like "The Power of Love" and "Gekreuzigt 2006". By 17 November 2006, Oomph! released those two songs in a form of double-single to promote the new compilation release.

On 9 February 2007, the band released their final GlaubeLiebeTod single "Träumst du?", featuring the female vocalist from Die Happy, Marta Jandová. The single peaked at No. 9 on the Media Control Charts. Oomph! performed the song live the same day at the 2007 edition of Bundesvision Song Contest, representing Lower Saxony in the competition, coming in first place.

On 6 July 2007, Oomph! opened for Metallica in Vienna, Austria.

Oomph!'s first DVD was Rohstoff, which contains live footage consisting of 23 songs, most of the videos the band has created, making-of videos, and an exclusive interview. The DVD was released on 20 July 2007.

=== Monster and Truth or Dare (2008–2010) ===
A new song called "Wach auf!" appeared in the film Aliens vs. Predator: Requiem; the single was released on 4 January 2008.

Oomph! made their first appearances at the Rock am Ring and Rock im Park festivals on 6 June 2008.

The band released their tenth album, Monster, on 22 August 2008, which peaked in the Media Control Charts at No. 8. The album's cover art was designed by a fan who won a contest the band held through their Myspace page. The band's most successful single from the new album is "Labyrinth", released in September 2008, which peaked at No. 26 on the Media Control Charts and No. 4 on the DAC Singles charts. The remaining tracks were released as B-sides on the upcoming singles. The first and only was "Sandmann", released in February 2009. Monster was reissued in June 2009 to include "Sandmann".

Oomph! opened for Marilyn Manson on 24 June 2009 in Linz, Austria.

The band recorded a version of "Ernten was wir säen" by Die Fantastischen Vier for the 2009 compilation album A Tribute to Die Fantastischen Vier.

On 26 February 2010, the band released their fourth compilation album, Truth or Dare, with their German songs re-recorded in English. From 24 April to 22 October, the band toured Europe to promote the new compilation album.

On 10 September 2010, Oomph! debuted the song "Sieger" ("Winner"), which was written for the ESL Pro Series 17, to a worldwide audience. The song had previously only been heard at the Gamescom 2010 trade fair.

=== Des Wahnsinns fette Beute and XXV (2011–2018) ===
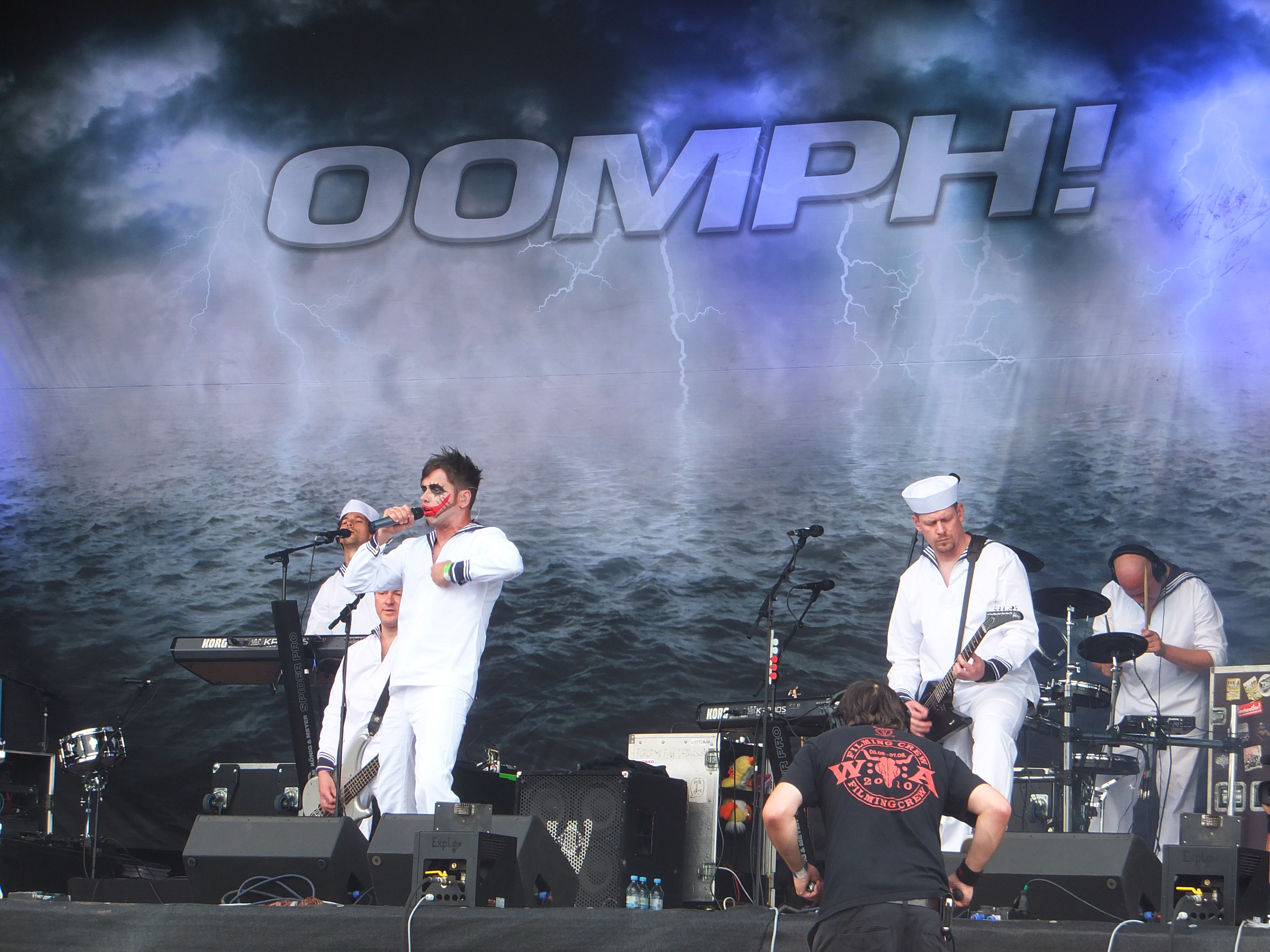
Oomph! at Wacken Open Air 2012

Flux announced on 8 October 2011, on the official Oomph! Facebook page, that recording of a new album would be finished by the end of November. Dero also said that after so much time, only 20 tracks would be chosen and then they would select 12 or 14 of the best of them.

The band announced on their official website that their next album is going to be titled Des Wahnsinns fette Beute. The first single, "Zwei Schritte vor", was released on 4 May 2012. The album was released on 18 May 2012.

Oomph! gained two new live members in 2012: Okusa (percussion) and El Friede (keyboards).

The band announced via their official Facebook page on 29 August 2012, that live drummer Leo (Christian Leonhardt) departed the band to take on new musical challenges. His last show with Oomph! was at the KRock U Maibutne Festival in Kherson, Ukraine, on 1 September 2012. Oomph!'s new drummer, Silvestri, was announced on 14 September 2012.

Dero mentioned in an interview with Global Metal Apocalypse on 16 May 2014 that the band had been working on a new album slated for an early 2015 release and that a 2015 UK tour was also planned. The album was released on 31 July 2015, titled XXV.

Oomph! announced via their official Facebook page on 23 May 2014 that they have a new live drummer, Martin Bode, and will perform with the band for the first time in June at the Wave Gotik Treffen Festival.

In September 2015, GlaubLiebeTod attained Gold status after selling more than 100,000 copies in Germany, nine years after its initial release. It was the band's first album to achieve gold and the band's second release to achieve it after their single "Augen auf!". On 5 December, Oomph! announced that they had been nominated for three GMA (Global Metal Apocalypse) awards. GMA Vocalist of the Year 2015 (Dero), GMA Music Video of the Year (Alles aus Liebe), and GMA Album of the Year (XXV).

Oomph! embarked on their European tour in April 2016 to promote XXV. They also performed a concert in Mexico on 3 December 2016, which was their first show in North America since 1993.

The band remained quiet throughout 2017, only going on a small tour in Russia early in the year, Faine Misto fest in Ternopil, Ukraine on 21 July, and Gothic Meets Klassik festival in Leipzig in November.

=== Ritual and Dero's departure (2018–2021) ===
Oomph! announced a string of festival appearances for 2018, including Greenfield Festival, Wacken Open Air and the second edition of the Volle Kraft voraus! festival with German band Eisbrecher.

Oomph! signed a worldwide deal with their new record label Napalm in April 2018. They also announced plans to release their 13th studio album in 2019.

On 12 November 2018, Oomph! teased artwork for the new album with the caption "Achtung! Achtung!" (Attention, attention!), as well as another post announcing a number of radio interviews in Berlin and an expected release date for the new album on 18 January 2019. On 13 January, another picture captioned "Seid ihr bereit?" (Are you ready?) was posted. On 15 November, a picture of the album artwork and its title, Ritual, was posted. The album's first single, "Kein Liebeslied", was released on 30 November 2018 with an accompanying lyric video.

Ritual was released on 18 January 2019 and went on to become the band's first ever album to debut at No. 1 on the German charts. The band then went on a month-long European tour in March 2019 to support the album.

On 29 September 2021, it was announced that Dero was no longer a part of the band.

=== New singer and Richter und Henker (2023–present) ===
On 22 June 2023, the band announced that "A new era for Oomph! is here", and that Daniel "Der" Schulz would be their new singer; their first single and video with Schulz were released on 11 July. The new album Richter und Henker will be released on 8 September 2023. Richter und Henker reached No.7 on the German Album Charts in its first week after its release.

On 21 September 2023, the band announced two new live members: Simon Schröder (drums) and Lajos (keyboards, synthesizer, backing vocals), with the former replacing Michael 'Silvestri' Merkert, who recently moved to Canada. Lajos was initially meant to replace Felix Vonk in 2020, but this was delayed due to the COVID-19 pandemic, which forced the band to cancel all remaining tour dates for 2020.

On 2 November 2023, the band embarked on a one-month-long European Tour to support the album. They were accompanied by German electronic metal band Böse Fuchs. The tour started on 2 November 2023 in Hannover and concluded on 24 November 2023 in Rostock.

On 12 February 2024, Oomph! announced another tour, containing eight tour dates, across Germany to celebrate the band's 35th anniversary. The tour started on 3 October 2024 in Krefeld and concluded on 11 October 2024 in Übach-Palenberg. They were accompanied by German nu metal band Tag My Heart. Additionally, the band also appeared on various festivals across Germany and Luxembourg, including Wacken Open Air and M'era Luna in August, Lordfest in December and Rockharz in July 2024.

== Members ==
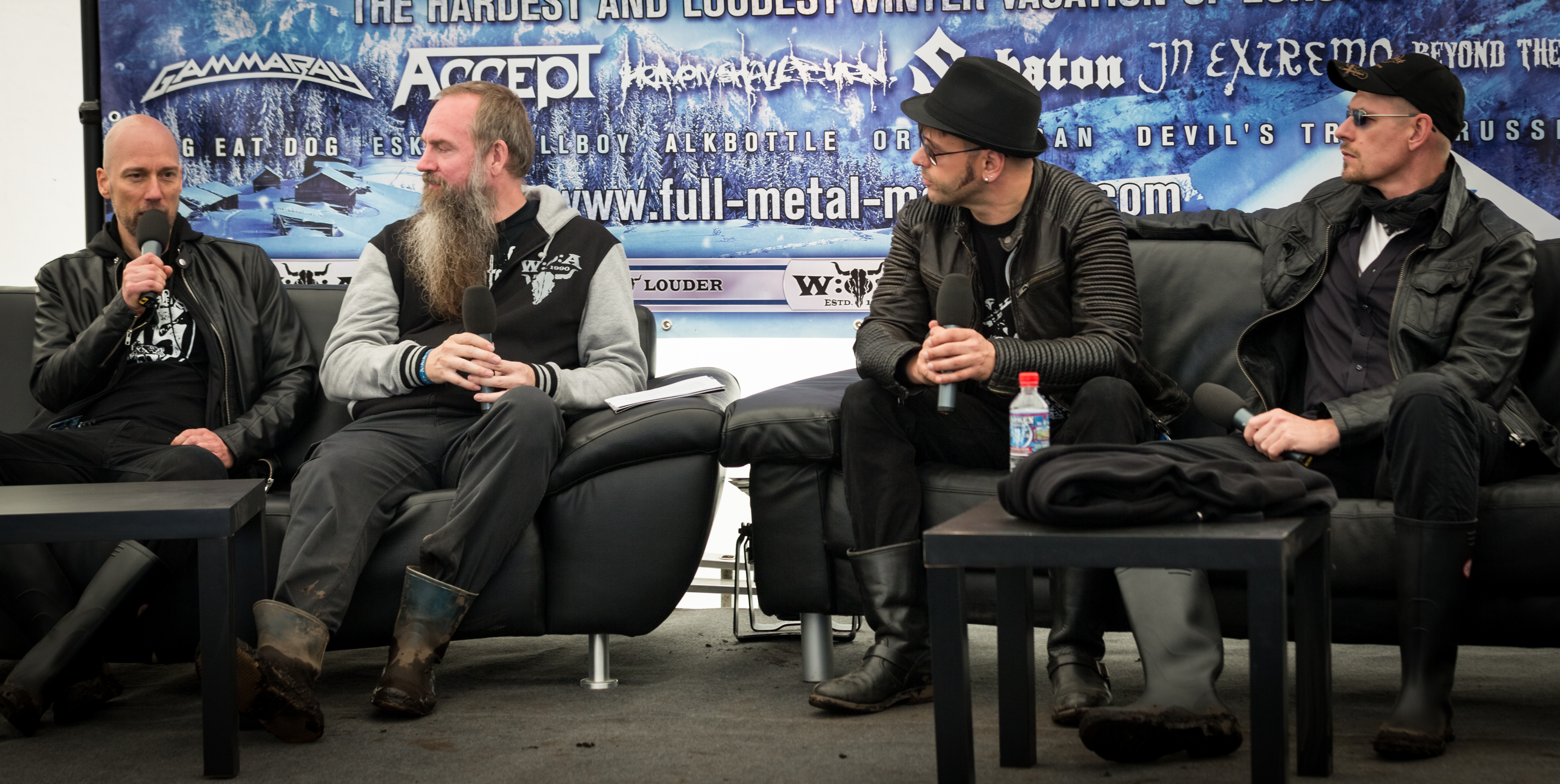
Oomph! interviewed at Wacken Open Air 2015

Current

- Andreas Crap (Thomas Döppner) – lead guitar, keyboards, backing vocals (1989–present)
- Robert Flux (Rene Bachmann) – rhythm guitar, samples, bass, backing vocals (1989–present)
- Der Schulz (Daniel Schulz) – lead vocals, occasional rhythm guitar (2023–present)

Former

- Dero Goi (Stephan Musiol) – lead vocals, studio drums, programming, live percussion (1989–2021)

Live

- Hagen Gödicke – bass, backing vocals (2002–present)
- Simon Schröder – drums (2023–present)
- Lajos – keyboards, synthesizers, backing vocals (2023–present)

Former live

- Léo (Christian Leonhardt) – drums (1993–2012)
- Tobi (Tobias Gloge) – bass, backing vocals (1993–2002)
- Martin Bode – drums (2013–2015)
- Silvestri (Michael Merkert) – drums (2012–2013; 2015–2023)
- El Friede – keyboards, synthesizers, backing vocals (2012–2015)
- Okusa (Patrick Lange) – e-drums, percussion (2012–2018)
- Felix Vonk – keyboards, backing vocals (2016–2020)

Timeline

== Discography ==
Albums

- Oomph! (1992)
- Sperm (1994)
- Defekt (1995)
- Wunschkind (1996)
- Unrein (1998)
- Plastik (1999)
- Ego (2001)
- Wahrheit oder Pflicht (2004)
- GlaubeLiebeTod (2006)
- Monster (2008)
- Des Wahnsinns fette Beute (2012)
- XXV (2015)
- Ritual (2019)
- Richter und Henker (2023)

== Tours ==
- Machinery Tour (1992)
- Sperm Tour (1994)
- Defekt Tour (1995)
- Wunschkind Tour (1997)
- Plastik Tour (1999)
- Here Comes The Pain Tour (2000)
- Ego Tour (2001–2003)
- Wahrheit oder Pflicht Tour (2004–2005)
- GlaubeLiebeTod Tour (2006)
- Spring 2006 Tour (2006)
- Deichbrand 2008 Tour (2008)
- Fall 2008 Tour (2008)
- Monster Tour (2008–2009)
- Truth or Dare Tour (2010–2011)
- Des Wahnsinns Fette Beute Tour (2012–2013)
- XXV Tour (2015–2016)
- Ritual Tour (2019–2020)
- European Tour (2023)
- 35th Anniversary Tour (2024)
