= Virgin Schallplatten =

German record company; subsidiary of Virgin Records Limited

Virgin Schallplatten GmbH
- Parent company: Universal Music Group; EMI (until 2012)
- Genre: Various
- Country of origin: Germany

Virgin Schallplatten GmbH was the German subsidiary of Virgin Records. It was consolidated into EMI Germany and since 2012 is the Virgin Music division of Universal Music Group Germany. Famous artists who recorded for the company include Sandra, Enigma, Deutsch Amerikanische Freundschaft, And One, RZA, and Reamonn.

== See also ==
- List of record labels
- Virgin Records
- Virgin Records artists
