= Dero Goi =

German musician

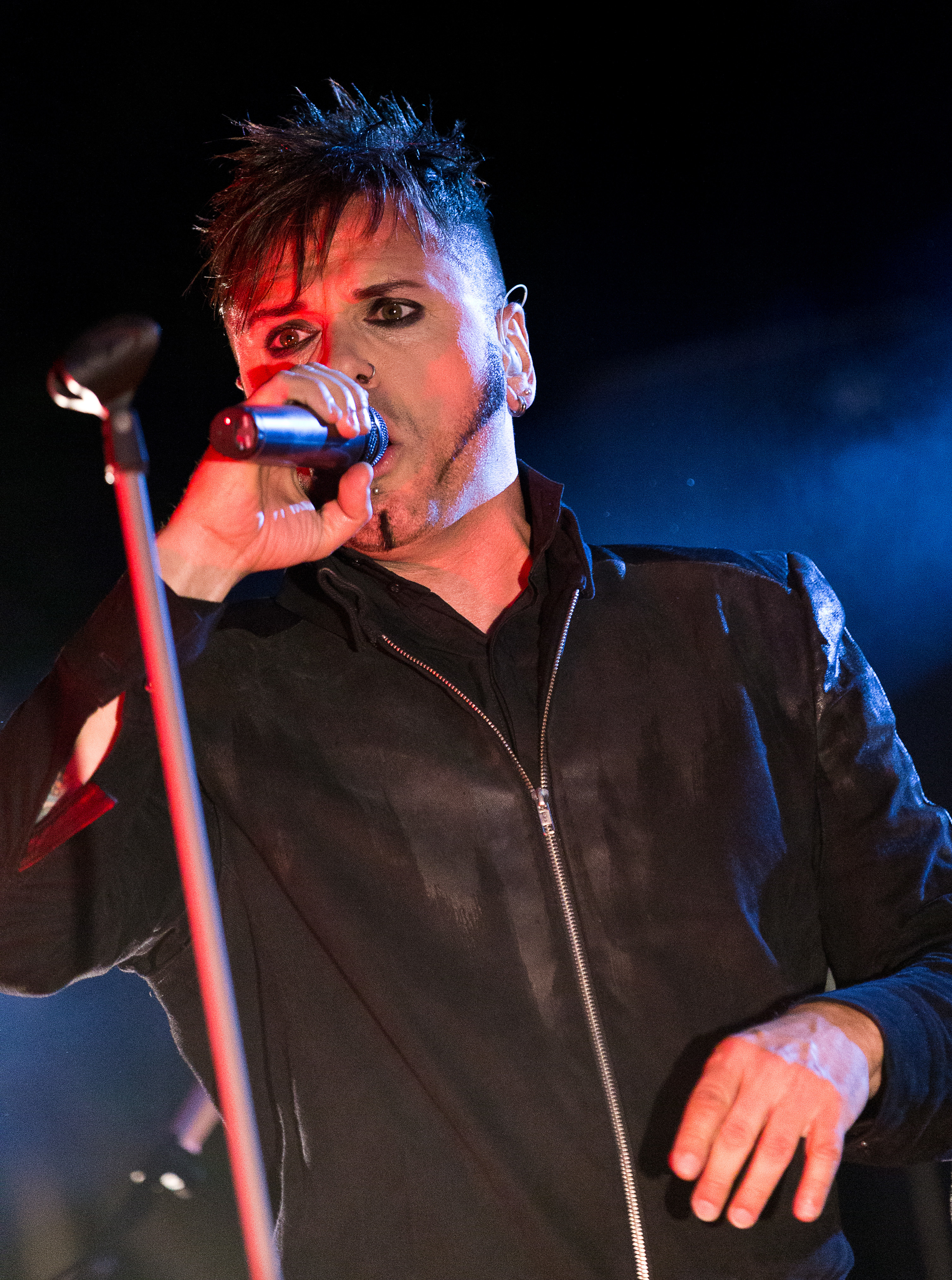
- Dero Goi performing with Oomph! in 2015

Background information
- Born: Stephan Musiol; 16 April 1970 (age 56); Wolfsburg, West Germany
- Genres: Neue Deutsche Härte, industrial rock, industrial metal, EBM
- Occupations: Singer, musician, songwriter
- Instruments: Vocals, drums
- Years active: 1989–present
- Member of: What About Bill?
- Formerly of: Oomph!; Die Kreatur
- Website: derogoi.com

Stephan Musiol (born 16 April 1970), known professionally as Dero Goi, is a German musician, best known as the former lead vocalist, drummer and founding member of Neue Deutsche Härte band Oomph! from 1989 to 2021.

== Early life ==
Dero Goi was born in Wolfsburg on 16 April 1970, where he grew up with his former bandmate Andreas Crap. They lived in the same tenement housing department and both started playing music in grade school. They built "instruments" with Persil packs. Dero was introduced to music through his father, who was a guitarist and singer. Dero was "forced" to sing Elvis Presley songs with his father.

In a 2021 interview with German daily Braunschweiger Zeitung, Goi discussed how his father's alcoholism affected him growing up. Goi attributes his father's condition to having had to flee Silesia in the aftermath of World War II, as part of the Vertreibungen, the flight and expulsion of ethnic Germans from Eastern European countries.

== Career ==
=== Oomph! and side projects ===
Dero and Crap met Robert Flux at an indie festival in Wolfsburg in 1989. They found out that they liked the same kind of music and wanted to start a band, which would combine the rock and electro scene; thus, Oomph! was born. On their first tour they were just those three, and played the music playback, except Dero, who sang.

When asked how Oomph! came up with their name, Dero said that the name was chosen because of its peculiarity.

"Because it was so strange to see that the name like that is existing. You know, with the two "o"s and the exclamation mark at the end. It was strange, you know, the visual aspect and pronunciation. And, you know, it’s always good to have a name where somebody is like "What was that?" You know, if your band name is like, I dunno, 'Toilet 2, 3, 4' it's, it's, I dunno... Your name has to be special. And this is a special name, definitely."

– Dero Goi

In 2020, Goi joined Chris Harms, frontman of fellow German band Lord of the Lost, to form the project Die Kreatur. They released one album that year, titled "Panoptikum".

In 2021, Dero Goi collaborated with Neue Deutsche Härte band Eisbrecher for two of the tracks, "Dagegen" (as a co-songwriter and by providing co-lead vocals) and "Frommer Mann" (as a co-songwriter), on their album Liebe macht Monster.

=== Conversion to evangelical Christianity and solo career ===
In April 2021, several German-language media outlets reported that Dero Goi, a longtime agnostic, had converted to Evangelical Christianity.

On 29 September 2021, it was announced that Dero would no longer be part of Oomph!. While his leaving the band was not explicitly ascribed to his conversion, it was widely reported that this move was "unsurprising" to Oomph! fans considering the occasionally anti-religious and dark subject matter explored by its music. Prior to leaving, Dero had distanced himself from the Oomph! lyrics in question.

On 27 October 2023, his first solo single Clickbait was released on Dependent Records. This was followed by the singles Resurrected and Whistleblower in 2024. The latter song has been described as "A tribute to whistleblowers who risk their lives" and the lyrics mention Julian Assange and Edward Snowden. His first solo album 1984 was released on 29 November 2024.

== Influences ==
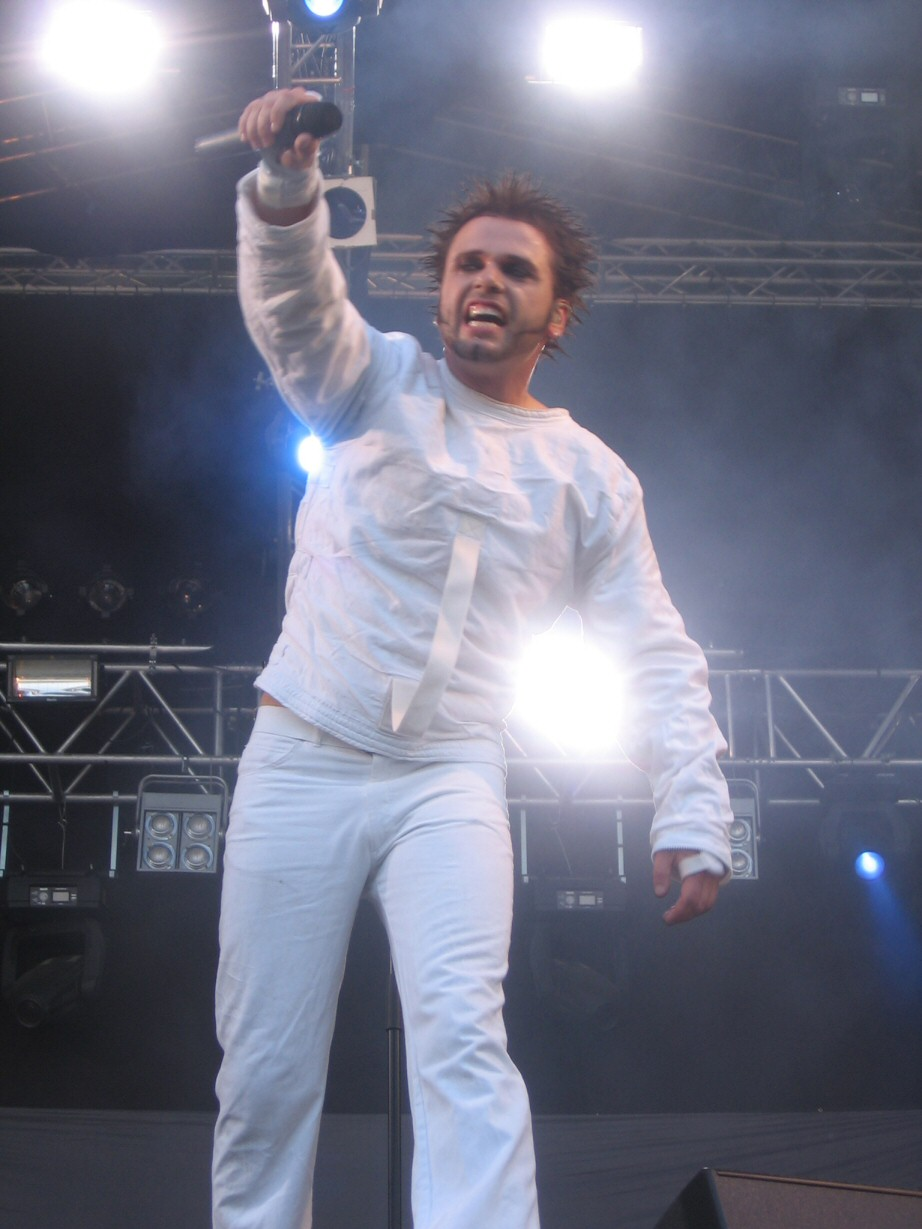
Dero Goi on stage in Finland in 2006

Dero Goi noted several bands and artists that he listens to in an interview with the website Deutschmusikland, including Frank Sinatra, Björk, Tool, Elvis Presley, Korn, and Nine Inch Nails. Other bands Dero has been influenced by include The Cure, Killing Joke, AC/DC, Motörhead, Depeche Mode, The Beatles, and ABBA. The members of Oomph! listen to and have been influenced by a variety of artists, including The Cure, Die Krupps, Depeche Mode, Nine Inch Nails, Deutsch Amerikanische Freundschaft, Einstürzende Neubauten, AC/DC, Garbage, Motörhead, and Korn.

== Discography ==
=== Solo ===
- 1984 (2024)

==== Singles ====
- Clickbait (2023)
- Resurrected (2024)
- Whistleblower (2024)

=== With Die Kreatur ===
- Panoptikum (2020)
