= List of songs about the September 11 attacks =

This list contains musical works which were inspired by or contain lyrics referring to the September 11 attacks.

Artist/composer	Title	Album	Year	Description
Emilie Autumn	"By The Sword"		2001	Released as a charity single.
Dan Bern	"NYC 911" (Unreleased)		2001	
The Charlie Daniels Band	"This Ain't No Rag, It's a Flag"	Live! (bonus track)	2001	
Cher	"Song for the Lonely"	Living Proof	2001	
Curse	"Nichts Wird Mehr So Sein Wie Es War"	Released as a free download	2001	
Sage Francis	"Makeshift Patriot"	Released as a single	2001	Lyrics include "Don't waive your rights with your flags"
Kristy Jackson	"Little Did She Know (She'd Kissed a Hero)"	Released as a single	2001	Written in response to 9/11. The song makes reference to a passenger on Flight 93. Responses to the song later became a book.
Michael Jackson	"What More Can I Give"	N/A	2001	Performed at an October 2001 benefit concert. Originally intended as a benefit single, but it was never released commercially.
Toby Keith	"Courtesy of the Red, White and Blue (The Angry American)"	Unleashed	2002	Toby Keith wrote this song in response to his father's death and the 9/11 attacks in 2001. At first, he was reluctant to record the song and decided to only play it live for military personnel. Later however, Marine Corps General James L. Jones convinced him to record it saying that it was his "duty as an American citizen to record the song."
Live	"Overcome"	V	2001	
Paul McCartney	"Freedom"	Driving Rain	2001	
Petey Pablo	"Raise Up (USA Flag Remix)"		2001	
Smash Mouth	"Out Of Sight"	Smash Mouth	2001	As they were in the process of creating their self titled album, the attacks occurred. The song was dedicated to the victims.
Taylor Swift	"Didn't They?"	Unreleased	2003	
The Weepies	"Safe as Houses"	Released Online	2001	
Wu-Tang Clan	"Rules"	Iron Flag	2001	Rapper Ghostface Killah speaks about the attacks in the first verse of the song, demanding to know who is responsible.
Tori Amos	"I Can't See New York"	Scarlet's Walk	2002	The song describes the experience of an airplane passenger on September 11, 2001, circling over New York City and unable to see the World Trade Center.
William Basinski		The Disintegration Loops	2002	
Bon Jovi	"Undivided"	Bounce	2002	
Bon Jovi	"Another Reason To Believe"	Bounce	2002	
Jon Bon Jovi and Richie Sambora	"America The Beautiful"		2002	
Box Car Racer	"Elevator"	Box Car Racer	2002	This song was written from the perspective of a jumper from the towers and from the perspective of someone watching from below.
Box Car Racer	"Watch The World"	Box Car Racer	2002	Lyrics include "I watched the smoke, as it grew darker, and blew up through the roof. I watched the fed, saw them panic as the fire grew."
Camel	"For Today"	A Nod and a Wink	2002	
The Charlie Daniels Band	"The Last Fallen Hero"	Redneck Fiddlin' Man	2002	
Coldplay	"Politik"	A Rush of Blood to the Head	2002	Written the day of the attacks. Chris Martin told NME that it reflects his realization of mortality after 9/11.
The Cranberries	"New New York"	Stars: The Best of 1992–2002	2002	
Steven Curtis Chapman	"Remember the Day"		2002	Lyrics include "Remember the day/The courage the valor/We ran to the towers/At such a great cost"
DC Talk	"Let's Roll"	Let's Roll: Together in Unity, Faith, and Hope	2002	
Bo Diddley	"We Ain't Scared of You" (a.k.a. "My Eagle Is Pissed")		2002	
Ani DiFranco	"Self Evident"	So Much Shouting, So Much Laughter	2002	The spoken word performance uses the 9/11 attacks as a way to criticize the US government.
DJ Sammy	"Heaven" (9/11 Remix)		2002	
Linda Eder	"If I Had My Way"	Gold	2002	
Linda Eder	"If I Should Lose My Way"	Gold	2002	
Eminem	"My Dad's Gone Crazy"	The Eminem Show	2002	Lyrics include: "More pain inside of my brain than the eyes of a little girl inside of a plane aimed at the World Trade"
Glassjaw	"Tip Your Bartender"	Worship and Tribute	2002	
Gorillaz featuring D12 and Terry Hall	"911"	Bad Company	2002	
Jack Hardy	"Ground Zero"	Vigil	2002	Released on a benefit album organized by Suzanne Vega, entirely of original songs about 9/11.
Alan Jackson	"Where Were You (When the World Stopped Turning)"	Drive	2001	
Bert Jansch	"Bright Sunny Morning"	Edge Of A Dream	2002	Lyrics include "With both towers ablaze the world watches on TV / It's all there for the whole world to see / Yeah, it took twenty minutes to change history."
Toby Keith	"My List"	Pull My Chain	2002	Tells about a firefighter who decides to spend more time with his family after witnessing the 9/11 attacks on television.
Killswitch Engage	"Life to Lifeless"	Alive or Just Breathing	2002	
Talib Kweli	"The Proud"	Quality	2002	A 9/11 oriented tribute.
L.A. Guns	"OK, Let's Roll"	Waking the Dead	2002	
Christine Lavin	"Firehouse"	Vigil	2002	Released on a benefit album organized by Suzanne Vega, entirely of original songs about 9/11.
Megaherz	"Glas Und Tränen"	Herzwerk II	2002	Literally "Glass And Tears" (and originally titled "Blut Und Tränen", "Blood And Tears"), contains an account of the violent atmosphere during and ideologies behind the attacks.
Megaherz	"I.M. Rumpelstilzchen"	Herzwerk II	2002	From the prospective of a double agent employed by a tyrannical government; about the paranoid global political climate after the attacks.
Moby	"Harbour"	18	2002	
My Chemical Romance	"Skylines and Turnstiles"	I Brought You My Bullets, You Brought Me Your Love	2002	Gerard Way wrote this song after witnessing the 9/11 attacks while on his way to work. He formed My Chemical Romance after witnessing the Twin Towers fall and this was the first song written by the band.
Carrie Newcomer	"I Heard an Owl"	The Gathering of Spirits	2002	Written in response to the 9/11 attacks. Chorus starts "so don't tell me hate is ever right or god's will"
No Use for a Name	"Insecurity Alert"	Hard Rock Bottom	2002	
Leslie Nuchow	"An Eye for an Eye (Will Leave the Whole World Blind)"	Balm for Gilead	2001	Written on September 12, 2001, the day after the attacks, it was first released as a single, then re-released in 2016 as part of the album Balm for Gilead
Tom Paxton	"The Bravest"	Looking for the Moon	2002	
Porcupine Tree	"Collapse the Light Into Earth"	In Absentia	2002	
Renaud and Axelle Red	"Manhattan-Kaboul"	Boucan d'enfer (Renauld)	2002	The song deals with the 9/11 attacks.
Rush	"Peaceable Kingdom"	Vapor Trails	2002	
Sleater-Kinney	"Far Away"	One Beat	2002	The song contrast's President George W. Bush's actions on September 11, when he was flown away to a secure location, with those of the emergency responders at the World Trade Center.
Michael W. Smith	"There She Stands"	Worship Again	2002	
Bruce Springsteen	"Countin' on a Miracle"	The Rising	2002	
Bruce Springsteen	"Empty Sky"	The Rising	2002	Told from the prospective of a person longing for one last moment with their spouse who was killed in the attacks.
Bruce Springsteen	"Into the Fire"	The Rising	2002	Told from the prospective of a spouse of a firefighter.
Bruce Springsteen	"Lonesome Day"	The Rising	2002	
Bruce Springsteen	"Mary's Place"	The Rising	2002	Told from the prospective of a widow whose spouse died in the attacks. A friend has invited this person to a party at "Mary's Place" to help with moving on.
Bruce Springsteen	"Paradise"	The Rising	2002	
Bruce Springsteen	"The Fuse"	The Rising	2002	A smoldering blend of lust and loss, having sex as a means to feel anything after tragedy.
Bruce Springsteen	"The Rising"	The Rising	2002	"A religious-tinged reflection on the events of the day that focuses on a firefighter at Ground Zero."
Bruce Springsteen	"You're Missing"	The Rising	2002	About how a family must continue to function after the father is killed in the attacks.
SR-71	"Truth"	Tomorrow	2002	
W.A.S.P.	"Hallowed Ground"	Dying for the World	2002	
Neil Young	"Let's Roll"	Are You Passionate?	2002	
Blue Man Group	"Exhibit 13"	The Complex	2003	This song was written in response to the attacks, as all three members of the original Blue Man Group were in Manhattan at the time.
50 Cent	"Patiently Waiting"	Get Rich or Die Tryin'	2003	Lyrics include: "Sit and politic with passengers from 9/11." and "Shady Records was eighty seconds away from the towers."
Mary Chapin Carpenter	"Grand Central Station"	Between Here and Gone	2003	This song is inspired by an interview with an iron worker who worked at Ground Zero that Carpenter watched. It is told from the prospective of the iron worker.
CunninLynguists	"Appreciation"	SouthernUnderground	2003	
Dusty Drake	"One Last Time"	Dusty Drake	2003	
Epica	"Façade of Reality"	The Phantom Agony	2003	Lyrics incluide the concluding line of a speech given by British Prime Minister Tony Blair on October 2, 2001, following the September 11 terrorist attacks honoring those killed on 9/11, "And those that mourn them, Now is the time for the strength to build that community, Let that be their memorial"
The Dresden Dolls	"Truce"	The Dresden Dolls	2003	Lyrics include: "I am the ground zero ex-friend you ordered, disguised as a hero to get past your borders" and "I am the tower around which you orbited, I am not proud, I am just taking orders. I fall to the ground within hours of impact."
Eagles	"Hole in the World"	The Very Best Of	2003	Don Henley began writing this song on September 11.
Echo Helstrom	"Floor 104"	Echo Helstrom	2003	Bandleader Ross Seligman's stepbrother died in the attack; the song ends with the refrain "please don’t go / please don’t go / to work today / to work today".
Evanescence	"My Last Breath"	Fallen	2003	
Everclear	"The New York Times"	Slow Motion Daydream	2003	
Mary Fahl	"The Dawning of the Day"	The Other Side of Time	2003	Fahl's version of the traditional Irish tune "The Dawning of the Day" was featured in the film version of the Broadway play The Guys.
Fleetwood Mac	"Illume (9-11)"	Say You Will	2003	
David Francey	"Grim Cathedral"	Skating Rink	2003	"Grim Cathedral" reflects the jingoism and Nationalism that arose following 9/11.
Amy Grant	"I Don't Know Why"	Simple Things	2003	
Lagwagon	"Never Stops"	Blaze	2003	Commentary on the immediate aftermath and American response in the days following 9/11.
Living Colour	"Flying"	Collideøscope	2003	From the perspective of a man who is nervous to ask out a woman in the World Trade Center moments before the first plane hits, and the couple then jump from the burning building to their deaths.
Rod MacDonald	"My Neighbors In Delray"	Recognition	2003	A portrait of the hijackers, 13 of whom lived in Delray Beach, Florida prior to September 11, 2001.
John Mayer	"Covered in Rain"	As/Is	2003	
Audra McDonald	"I'll Be Here"	Go Back Home	2003	From the musical Ordinary Days
Sarah McLachlan	"World on Fire"	Afterglow	2003	
Bret Michaels	"One More Day"	Songs of Life	2003	
Paris	"What Would You Do?"	Sonic Jihad	2003	About 9/11 conspiracy theories.
The Stills	"Let's Roll"	Logic Will Break Your Heart	2003	
Joe Strummer and the Mescaleros	"Ramshackle Day Parade"	Streetcore	2003	
Sworn Enemy	"Sworn Enemy"	As Real as It Gets	2003	
Thriving Ivory	"Angels on the Moon"	Thriving Ivory	2003	
Rufus Wainwright	"11:11"	Want One	2003	The song lyrics reference waking up on the morning of 9/11, "Woke up this mornin' and somethin' was burnin' / Realized that everythin' really does happen in Manhattan."
Darryl Worley	"Have You Forgotten?"	Have You Forgotten?	2003	The song is about the horror of the attacks, with lyrics including "Have you forgotten when those towers fell? / We had neighbors still inside going through a living hell."
Yellowcard	"Believe"	Ocean Avenue	2003	The song is about rescue workers, and integrates news reports.
Ryan Adams	"My Blue Manhattan"	Love Is Hell	2004	Lyrics include: "Fire and rain on the streets."
Amps for Christ	"AFC Tower Song"	The People at Large	2004	
Autopilot Off	"The 12th Day"	Make a Sound	2004	
Beastie Boys	"An Open Letter to NYC"	To the 5 Boroughs	2004	A general song about New York City, includes the lyrics "since 9/11, we're still livin' and lovin', life we've been given." and "two towers down, but you're still in the game."
Black 47	"Mychal"	New York Town	2004	
Leonard Cohen	"On That Day"	Dear Heather	2004	
Melissa Etheridge	"Tuesday Morning"	Lucky	2004	This song is dedicated to Mark Bingham, one of the four passengers of Flight 93 who attempted to control the place from the hijackers.
Iced Earth	"When the Eagle Cries"	The Glorious Burden	2004	
Jadakiss	"Why"	Kiss of Death	2004	Lyrics include "Why did Bush knock down the Towers?"
Lucy Kaplansky	"Land of the Living"	The Red Thread	2004	
Manic Street Preachers	"Empty Souls"	Lifeblood	2004	Contains the line "Collapsing like the Twin Towers", however, this was changed to "Collapsing like dying flowers" for the single release.
Misia featuring Erykah Badu	"Akai Inochi" (Red Destiny)	Mars & Roses	2004	An anti-war song which speaks about how the events of 9/11 turned the "seemingly distant existence of war into the reality of now".
Scarling.	"Alexander The Burn Victim"	Sweet Heart Dealer	2004	
Tesla	"Heaven Nine Eleven"	Into the Now	2004	
Twista featuring Faith Evans	"Hope"	Kamikaze	2004	"Wish God never gave the men power/To be able to hurt the people inside the Twin Towers"
Within Temptation	"Stand My Ground"	The Silent Force and also as additional tracks on some releases of The Heart of Everything	2004	
...And You Will Know Us by the Trail of Dead	"Worlds Apart"	Worlds Apart	2005	"How they laugh as we shovelled the ashes of the Twin Towers / Blood and death, we will pay back the debt of this candy store of ours"
Dream Theater	"Sacrificed Sons"	Octavarium	2005	Opens with samples of 9/11 news broadcasts; the song itself is about the attack on the World Trade Center and its aftermath
Goldfinger featuring Mest and Good Charlotte	"The Innocent"	The Best of Goldfinger	2005	
Juliana Hatfield	"Hole in the Sky"	Made In China	2005	About the gap in the Manhattan skyline left by the destruction of the Twin Towers.
Immortal Technique	"Bin Laden"	Released as a single	2005	Attributes much of the blame for 9/11 to U.S. foreign policy.
James LaBrie	"Smashed"	Elements of Persuasion	2005	
Will Smith featuring Mary J. Blige	"Tell Me Why"	Lost and Found	2005	
John Vanderslice	"Exodus Damage"	Pixel Revolt	2005	The second verse describes the narrator watching the second plane hitting the World Trade Center on television, as well as an absence of immediate military response to the attacks.
Wheatus	"Hometown"	TooSoonMonsoon	2005	A love song to the group's hometown, New York, which thinks to a time when the twin towers completed the New York skyline. Includes the lyrics "I swear it was beautiful before they sent those aeroplanes."
Mark Knopfler and Emmylou Harris	"If This Is Goodbye"	All the Roadrunning	2006	Inspired by Ian McEwan's piece in The Guardian.
Ministry	"Lieslieslies"	Rio Grande Blood	2006	
Delfín Quishpe	"Torres Gemelas"		2006	
Sabaton	"In The Name of God"	Attero Dominatus	2006	The song not only references 9/11 but terrorism in general.
Slayer	"Jihad"	Christ Illusion	2006	
Scott Walker	"Jesse"	The Drift	2006	Presents the attack on the Twin Towers as a nightmare had by Elvis Presley and described to his own stillborn twin, Jesse Garon Presley.
Arcade Fire	"(Antichrist Television Blues)"	Neon Bible	2007	Lyrics include: "I don't want to work in a building downtown; I don't know what I'm going to do, 'cause the planes keep crashing, always two by two."
Bloc Party	"Hunting for Witches"	A Weekend in the City	2007	This song is about frontman Kele Okereke's observations on the media response to terrorist attacks after the September 11 attacks
Dawnstar	"Don't Die A Martyr For Me"	Change the World	2007	Lyrics include: "I wanted to be a suicide bomber but she changed my life, I fell in love with her"
Serj Tankian	"Empty Walls"	Elect The Dead	2007	
Suzanne Vega	"Angel's Doorway"	Beauty & Crime	2007	The song follows a police officer stationed at Ground Zero
Suzanne Vega	"Anniversary"	Beauty & Crime	2007	The song is set in New York City on the one-year anniversary of the September 11 attacks and discusses how New Yorkers' lives have changed.
Suzanne Vega	"Zephyr and I"	Beauty & Crime	2007	Refers to the "fireman’s monument, where all the fatherless teenagers go"
Velvet Revolver	"Messages"	Libertad (iTunes release)	2007	
James	"Hey Ma"	Hey Ma	2008	Addresses the price paid for revenge
Sheryl Crow	"God Bless this Mess"	Detours	2008	Linked 9/11 with the Gulf War.
Sheryl Crow	"Out of Our Heads"	Detours	2008	About the courage shown on 9/11; also criticizes Bush as giving a manipulative television address on that day.
Strung Out	"Blueprint of the Fall"	Exile in Oblivion	2004	Written as a direct response to the aftermath of the attacks and delves into the 2001 war in Afghanistan.
Libera and Peter Skellern	"Rest in Peace"	New Dawn	2008	Written by Peter Skellern to honor those who were killed in the 9/11 attacks, as well as those who died in WWI and WWII.
Star Fucking Hipsters	"9/11 Was (An Inside Joke)"	Until We're Dead	2008	
Testament	"The Evil Has Landed"	The Formation of Damnation	2008	
Thrice	"Broken Lungs"	The Alchemy Index Vols. III & IV	2008	
Lily Allen	"Him"	It's Not Me, It's You	2009	Lyrics include "Ever since we can remember, people have died in his good name, long before that September, long before hijacking planes."
Rekha Bhardwaj	"Ranaji"	Gulaal	2009	Gulaal soundtrack album by Piyush Mishra
The Empire Shall Fall	"Choir of Angels"	Awaken	2009	
Five for Fighting	"Tuesday"	Slice	2009	Five for Fighting's "Superman," released earlier in 2001, also became an unofficial anthem for the first responders in the days following the attacks
Peter Hammill	"Ghosts of planes"	Thin Air	2009	
Immortal Technique	"The Cause of Death"	Revolutionary Vol. 2	2009	
Jay-Z and Alicia Keys	"Empire State of Mind"	The Blueprint 3	2009	The song is largely about New York City in general, but includes the line "Long live the World Trade."
Fear Factory	"Controlled Demolition"	Mechanize	2010	
And One	"Seven"	Tanzomat	2011	Lyrics include: "Grey smoke hit the ground; Seven came down without a sound; Rich man company; WTC mystery" (a reference to the September 11 attacks and the mystery third white plane which has caused some speculation)
Beyoncé	"I Was Here"	4	2011	Beyonce stated that this song was inspired by the September 11 attacks.
Kate Bush featuring Elton John	"Snowed in at Wheeler Street"	50 Words for Snow	2011	"9/11 in New York, I took your photograph."
Childish Gambino	"Freaks and Geeks"	Camp	2011	Lyrics include "This beat is a disaster, 9/11 this track."
Lupe Fiasco	"Words I Never Said"	Lasers	2011	Includes the lyrics: "I really think the War on Terror is a bunch of bullshit, just a poor excuse for you to use up all your bullets, how much money does it take to really make a full clip, 9/11, building 7, did they really pull it?"
John Hiatt	"When New York Had Her Heart Broke"	Dirty Jeans and Mudslide Hymns	2011	
Imagine Dragons	"America"	Night Visions	2011	Lyrics include "From farmers in the fields, to the tallest of the towers that fall and rise, 1-7-7-6, the names upon the list, for all the ones that gave until they died."
The Low Anthem	"Boeing 737"	Smart Flesh	2011	
The Oak Ridge Boys	"Sacrifice...For Me"	It's Only Natural	2011	
Steve Reich	"WTC 9/11"	WTC 9/11	2011	
Jack Warshaw	"United 93"	Good Road	2011	Lyrics include "United 93, remember their names, Come tell of the time on that great silver plane, The bravest band of travellers that ever flew the sky, Said we're bound to fight cause we know we're bound to die."
Ween	"Love Come Down (09-11-01)"	The Caesar Demos	2011	The song was recorded on the day of the attacks
Nell Bryden	"Sirens"	Shake the Tree	2012	This song was written by New York singer Nell Bryden and Patrick Mascall and was later covered by Cher on her Closer to the Truth album
Jackyl	"Open Invitation (I Hate You Bin Laden)"	Best in Show	2012	
Jeff Powers	"Tall Buildings (9/11)"	JeffPowers	2012	
ミラクルミュージカル (Miracle Musical)	"Variations on a Cloud"	Released as a single; described as the "0th Track" of the album Hawaii: Part II	2012	The original music video, since deleted by Youtube, contained footage of the attacks. The song was released in 2012, its music video in 2015, and returned to streaming services in 2021, but has since been removed.
Lily Kershaw	"Ashes Like Snow"	Midnight in the Garden	2013	Originally written as a poem, "Ashes Like Snow" is about the September 11 attacks. Lyrics include: "A strange dance from the towers in the sky", "Fire so hot at their backs, better to hit the ground".
MellowHype	"Decoy"	Mellowhypeweek	2013	
The BibleCode Sundays	"The Boys of Queens"		2014	Song about a soldier who is a member of an Irish family from Queens. His family has a firefighter tradition and most of its male members died on 9/11. Furthermore, it deals with him suffering from the events and the aftermath and his own death in the Middle East.
Stephen Paul Taylor	"Everybody Knows Shit's Fucked"	People Tonight	2014	9/11 conspiracy themed song.
Craig Finn	"Newmyer's Roof"	Faith in the Future	2015	"I saw the towers go down from up on Newmyer's Roof."
Heems	"Flag Shopping"	Eat Pray Thug	2015	About backlash racism following 9/11
Cat System Corp.		News at 11	2016	A concept album exploring an alternate universe where the attacks never happened, released exactly 15 years after the event.
Kevin Devine	"No History"	Instigator	2016	
Irene Sankoff and David Hein	"Me and the Sky"	Come from Away (Broadway Musical)	2017	From the Broadway Musical Come from Away and tells the story of a pilot (Beverly Bass) diverted due to the September 11 attacks.
Imagine Dragons	"Real Life"	Origins	2018	Lyrics include "She prays on her knees as the towers fall to a god she does not know." Also includes references to the Boston Marathon bombing and mass shootings in America.
Alec Benjamin	"1994"	Narrated for You	2018	A song about Alec Benjamin realizing the harsh realities of life growing up. Lyrics include "And nobody's invincible, Because I know people die, I saw it on the news one day, When the towers fell down, September's not the same place now, same place now, same place, now".
Skylar Grey; Polo G Mozzy; Eminem	"Last One Standing"	Venom: Let There Be Carnage	2021	Towards the end of the song, Eminem raps the lines "So a lot of this pain isn't healing/ No escaping it, this anger is spilling/ Almost like recreating the feeling of 9/11 when the second plane hit the building" followed by the sound of a plane crashing into a building.
My Chemical Romance	"The Foundations of Decay"	Released as a single	2022	Lyrics include "He was there, the day the towers fell, And so he wandered down the road"
James McMurtry	"Annie"	The Black Dog and the Wandering Boy	2025	
Leslie Fish	"Flight 93"	Lock & Load	2009	A filk ballad about the hijacking of United Airlines Flight 93 and the attempt to retake the cockpit by the passengers.

== See also ==
- List of songs deemed inappropriate by Clear Channel following the September 11, 2001 attacks
- List of cultural references to the September 11 attacks (classical music)
