= And One discography =

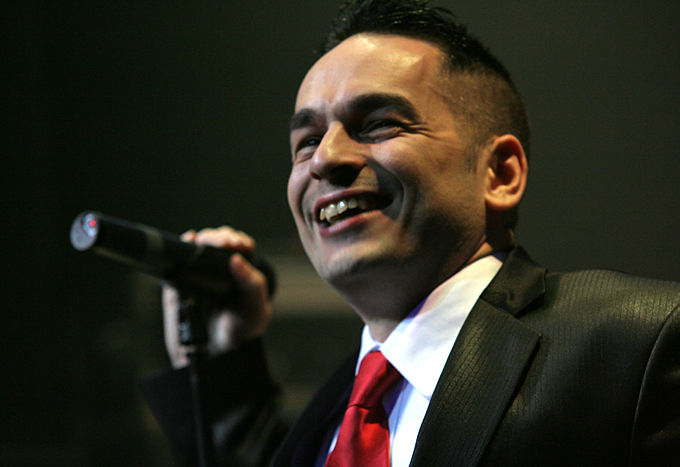
- Band member Steve Naghavi in 2008
- Studio albums: 12
- Extended plays: 5
- Live albums: 2
- Compilation albums: 2
- Singles: 21
- Video albums: 1
- Music videos: 17

The discography of German synth-pop band And One consists of 12 studio albums, 2 live albums, 2 compilation albums, 1 video album, 5 extended plays, 21 singles, and 17 music videos. And One was formed in 1989 by Steve Naghavi and Chris Ruiz, who met at a club in Berlin. Their first single, "Metalhammer", was considered a "significant club hit". Alex Two joined the group prior to the release of their first album, Anguish, which was released in 1991 by Machinery Records.

== Albums ==
=== Studio albums ===
| Title | Year | Peak chart positions |
| Title | Year | GER |
|---|---|---|
| Anguish | 1991 | — |
| Flop! | 1992 | — |
| Spot | 1993 | 90 |
| I.S.T. | 1994 | — |
| Nordhausen | 1997 | 59 |
| 9.9.99 9 Uhr | 1998 | 15 |
| Virgin Superstar | 2000 | 33 |
| Aggressor | 2003 | 33 |
| Bodypop | 2006 | 30 |
| Tanzomat | 2011 | 23 |
| S.T.O.P. | 2012 | 24 |
| Magnet | 2014 | 2 |
| Propeller | 2014 | ? |
| Achtung 80 | 2014 | ? |

=== Live albums ===
| Title | Year | Peak chart positions |
| Title | Year | GER |
|---|---|---|
| Bodypop 1 1/2 | 2009 | 89 |
| Live | 2009 | 62 |

=== Compilation albums ===
| Title | Year |
|---|---|
| Best Of | 1997 |
| Naghavi's Selection 97-03 | 2011 |

== Extended plays ==
| Title | Year |
|---|---|
| Monotonie | 1992 |
| Military Fashion Show | 2006 |
| Frontfeuer | 2006 |
| Shouts of Joy | 2012 |
| Shice Guy | 2012 |
| Back Home | 2012 |

== Singles ==
| Title | Year | Peak chart positions | Album |
| Title | Year | GER | Album |
|---|---|---|---|
| "Metalhammer" | 1990 | — | Anguish |
| "Aus Der Traum!" | 1991 | — | Non-album single |
| "Techno Man" | 1991 | — | Flop! |
| "Life Isn't Easy In Germany" | 1993 | — | Spot |
| "Driving With My Darling" | 1994 | — | I.S.T. |
| "Deutschmaschine" | 1995 | — | I.S.T. |
| "Sometimes" | 1997 | 96 | Nordhausen |
| "Sweety Sweety" | 1997 | — | Nordhausen |
| "Get You Closer" | 1998 | 60 | 9.9.99 9 Uhr |
| "Wasted" | 2000 | 77 | Virgin Superstar |
| "Amerika Brennt!" | 2001 | — | Non-album single |
| "Krieger" | 2003 | 84 | Aggressor |
| "Military Fashion Show" | 2006 | 86 | Bodypop |
| "So Klingt Liebe" | 2006 | 34 | Bodypop |
| "Traumfrau" | 2006 | 86 | Bodypop |
| "Zerstörer" | 2011 | — | Tanzomat |
| "Back Home" | 2012 | — | S.T.O.P. |
| "Shouts Of Joy" | 2012 | 78 | S.T.O.P. |

== Videography ==
=== Video albums ===
| Title | Year |
|---|---|
| Live | 2009 |
