= Zombieland (Megaherz album) =

2014 studio album by Megaherz

Studio album by Megaherz
- Released: 24 October 2014
- Genre: Neue Deutsche Härte, industrial metal
- Length: 48:50 (standard edition); 65:28 (limited edition)
- Label: Napalm Records

Megaherz chronology
Götterdämmerung (2012)	Zombieland (2014)	Komet (2018)

Singles from Zombieland
- 1. "Gegen den Wind" Released: 25 January 2013; 2. "Wir könnten Götter sein" Released: 20 September 2014

Zombieland is the eighth studio album by German rock band Megaherz, released on 24 October 2014. The track "Zombieland" appeared in the German RTL commercial for the fourth season of "The Walking Dead".

== Track listing ==
All music is composed by Megaherz except tracks 12, 15 - by: Alexx Wesselsky and Noel Pix, and 14 - by: Mathias Elsholz .

No.	Title	Length
1.	"Zombieland (“Zombieland”)"	3:36
2.	"Himmelsstürmer (“Stormer of Heaven”)"	4:36
3.	"Für immer (“Forever”)"	4:07
4.	"Roter Mond (“Red Moon”)"	4:07
5.	"Wir könnten Götter sein (“We Could be Gods”)"	3:46
6.	"Lieblingsfeind (“Favorite Enemy”)"	3:11
7.	"Fanatisch (“Fanatic”)"	4:42
8.	"Schwarzer Engel (“Black Angel”)"	3:54
9.	"Unter Strom (“Under Current”)"	3:33
10.	"Gegen den Wind (“Against the Wind”)"	4:38
11.	"Hurra - wir leben noch (“Hurrah - We're Still Alive”) (from the album Himmelfahrt)"	5:05
12.	"Frei (“Free”)"	3:28
Total length:		48:50

Limited Edition
No.	Title	Length
13.	"Sanctus Dominus" (instrumental)	2:49
14.	"Augenblick (Pianoversion) (“Moment”)" (from the album 5)	5:21
15.	"Herz aus Stein (“Heart of Stone”)" (from the album Kopfschuss)	4:16
16.	"Gegen den Wind (Pianoversion) (“Against the Wind (Piano Version)”)"	4:10
Total length:		65:28

== Charts ==
Chart (2014)	Peak position
Austrian Albums (Ö3 Austria)	75
German Albums (Offizielle Top 100)	17
Swiss Albums (Schweizer Hitparade)	68
