= Querschnitt =

Compilation album by Megaherz
- Released: 2001
- Genre: Neue Deutsche Härte; industrial metal
- Length: 110:47
- Label: ZYX
- Producer: Megaherz

Megaherz chronology
| Himmelfahrt (2000) | Querschnitt (2001) | Herzwerk II (2002) |

Professional ratings
Review scores
| Source | Rating |
|---|---|
| AllMusic | 3.5/5 stars |

Querschnitt ("cross section") is a compilation album by German industrial metal band Megaherz. It was released in 2001.

== Track listing ==
=== CD 1 ===
1. "Miststück" – 3:29
2. "Gott sein" – 4:13
3. "Kopf durch die Wand" – 4:29
4. "Wer bist du?" – 3:05
5. "Kopfschuss" – 4:19
6. "Herz aus Stein" – 4:04
7. "Jordan" – 3:38
8. "Burn" – 1:37
9. "Rappunzel" – 3:57
10. "Himmelfahrt" – 6:01
11. "Tanz auf dem Vulkan" – 5:41
12. "Das Licht am Ende der Welt" – 4:23
13. "Hurra – Wir leben noch" – 4:43
14. "Schlag' zurück" – 3:59
15. "Teufel" – 5:00
16. "Hänschenklein '97" – 2:50

=== CD 2 ===
1. "Freiflug" (radio edit) – 3:48
2. "Freiflug" – 4.58
3. "Liebestöter (Club Mix)" – 4.35
4. "Liebestöter (Atomic Mix)" – 5:33
5. "Rock Me, Amadeus" (radio edit) – 3:26
6. "Rock Me, Amadeus (Fieberwahn Mix)" – 6:02
7. "Gott sein (Blemish's Buss & Bet Mix)" – 7:39
8. "Gott sein (Kerosin Take Off Mix)" – 4:30
9. "Himmelfahrt" (radio edit) – 4:29

=== Multimedia bonus track ===
1. "Freiflug" (music video) – 3:46
