= Freiflug =

Single by Megaherz

from the album Kopfschuss
- Released: 29 March 1999
- Genre: Metal
- Label: ZYX Music
- Songwriters: Alexander Wesselsky; Noel Pix; Wenz Weninger
- Producers: Andi List; Yogi Lang

Megaherz singles chronology
"Liebestöter" (1998)	"Freiflug" (1999)	"Himmelfahrt" (2000)

"Freiflug" (German for "Free Flight") is the fourth single by German metal band Megaherz, and the third and final single from their album Kopfschuss.

== Track listing ==
1. "Freiflug (Video / Radio Cut)"
2. "Freiflug (Album Version)"
3. Multimedia-track (CD extra track with video, biography, band photos, etc.)

== Video ==
The video for "Freiflug" shows Alexx Wesselsky, the vocalist for the band, tied up in a rope and hung over a fire (as shown in the cover for the single). Rats feature prominently in the video, and the clown from the cover of Kopfschuss is also shown. At the end of the video, rats chew through the ropes supporting him and he falls, presumably to his death.

The video is available for free download and streaming on the official Megaherz site.
