= Wer bist du? =

Studio album by Megaherz
- Released: 12 July 1997
- Genre: Neue Deutsche Härte; industrial metal
- Length: 52:16
- Label: ZYX, Benz Street
- Producer: Andi Knote

Megaherz chronology
Herzwerk (1995)	Wer bist du? (1997)	Kopfschuss (1998)

Singles from Wer bist du?
- 1. "Gott sein" Released: 6 October 1997

Wer bist du? ("Who are you?") is the first full-length album by German industrial metal band Megaherz. Following the limited edition release of their debut album, Herzwerk. The album includes three songs from Herzwerk: "Krone der Schöpfung" (originally a two-part song, here a single track), "Negativ", and "Hänschenklein 1995" (remade as "Hänschenklein Siebenundneunzig").

The first track, "Gott sein", is one of Megaherz's most famous, and considers the problems of being God, culminating in the refrain "Es ist nicht leicht ein Gott zu sein" ("It's not easy to be a god").

The penultimate track, "Hänschenklein Siebenundneunzig", is based on a German nursery rhyme Hänschen klein, in which Hänschen klein (which translates most closely as "Little Hans") leaves home, causing his mother great grief. In the nursery rhyme, Hans returns home; in Megaherz's song, he is brutally murdered to the point that his mother cannot recognise him. The song shares the first line of the chorus "Aber Mutter weinte sehr" ("But mother wept deeply") and ends with a brief drum solo accompanied by squeals of feedback and the whistling of the original nursery tune. The song was the first of several Megaherz songs to be based on nursery rhymes, preceding "Rapunzel" on Kopfschuss, "Windkind" on Himmelfahrt (which echoed the story of Goldilocks) and "I. M. Rumpelstilzchen" on Herzwerk II.

The album was re-released in the US in 2004 as I (read as "One" or "Eins").

== Track listing ==
1. "Gott sein" (To Be God) – 4:15
2. "Wer bist du?" (Who Are You?) – 3:07
3. "Schlag' zurück" (Fight Back) – 4:01
4. "Das Leben" (The Life) – 3:59
5. "Finsternis" (Darkness) – 1:19
6. "Licht" (Light) – 3:51
7. "Negativ" (Negative) – 3:44
8. "Kopf durch die Wand" (Head Through the Wall) – 4:31
9. "Müde" (Tired) – 4:39
10. "Krone der Schöpfung" (Pride of Creation) – 4:05
11. "Tanzen gehen" (To Go Dancing) – 3:23
12. "Die Gedanken sind frei" (Thoughts Are Free) – 3:59
13. "Hänschenklein '97" (Little Hans '97) – 2:52
14. "Wer bist du? (Remix)" – 4:31
