= Himmelfahrt (album) =

Studio album by Megaherz
- Released: 2000
- Genre: Neue Deutsche Harte, industrial metal
- Length: 53:24
- Label: ZYX Music
- Producer: Christian "X-ti" Bystron

Megaherz chronology
Kopfschuss (1998)	Himmelfahrt (2000)	Querschnitt (2001)

Singles from Himmelfahrt
- 1. "Himmelfahrt" Released: 2000

Himmelfahrt (German pronunciation: [ˈhɪml̩faːɐ̯t], "ascension", "suicide mission") is the third studio album by German rock band Megaherz, released in 2000.

== Track listing ==
No.	Title	Length
1.	"Du oder ich" (You or Me)	3:33
2.	"Himmelfahrt" (Ascension^{[a]})	6:03
3.	"Showdown"	4:07
4.	"Mensch-Maschine" (Man-Machine)	4:09
5.	"Windkind" (Wind child)	3:45
6.	"Falsche Götter" (False Gods)	4:42
7.	"Ruf mich an" (Call me up)	3:41
8.	"Hurra – Wir leben noch" (Hurray – We're Still Alive)	4:45
9.	"Das Licht am Ende der Welt" (The Light at the End of the World)	4:25
10.	"Beiß mich!" (Bite Me!)	4:03
11.	"Tötet den DJ" (Kill the DJ)	4:29
12.	"Tanz auf dem Vulkan" (Dance on the Volcano^{[b]})	5:42
Total length:		53:24

=== Notes ===
- ^{^[a]} In English, "Himmelfahrt" literally means "journey to heaven" or "ascension". In the context of the lyrics it is used in, it means the sense of doing something where the chances of surviving are slim to none.
- ^{^[b]} "Tanz auf dem Vulkan" means "to live on the edge", but literally it translates into "dance on the volcano".

== Personnel ==
- Alexander Wesselsky – lead vocals
- Christian "X-ti" Bystron – guitars
- Wenz – bass
- Frank Gegerle – drums
- Noel Pix – guitars, keyboards, sampling
- Yogi Lang – keyboards, additional programming
- Petra Scheeser – female vocals on "Ruf mich an"
- Mathias "Jablonski" Elsholz – backing vocals on "Windkind" and "Falsche Götter"
- Jan Frommel – photos

== Charts ==
Chart (2000)	Peak position
German Albums (Offizielle Top 100)	78
