= Heuchler =

2008 studio album by Megaherz

Studio album by Megaherz
- Released: 25 July 2008
- Genre: Neue Deutsche Härte, industrial metal
- Length: 52:02; 60:17
- Label: ZYX Music

Megaherz chronology
5 (2004)	Heuchler (2008)	Götterdämmerung (2012)

Singles from Heuchler
- 1. "Mann von Welt" Released: 27 June 2008; 2. "Heuchler" Released: 30 April 2009

Heuchler (German for Hypocrite) is the sixth album by German industrial metal band Megaherz, released on 25 July 2008. It is the first album by the band to feature Alexander "Lex" Wohnhaas as vocalist and Jürgen "Bam Bam" Wiehler on the drummer.

== Track listing ==
All music is composed by Megaherz.

No.	Title	Length
1.	"Heuchler ("Hypocrite")"	4:59
2.	"Das Tier ("The Animal")"	4:36
3.	"Ebenbild ("Spitting Image")"	5:10
4.	"Mann von Welt ("Man of the World")"	4:24
5.	"Fauler Zauber ("Cheap Trick")" (feat. Kirsten Zahn)	4:24
6.	"Mein Gral ("My Grail")"	3:56
7.	"L'Aventure ("The Adventure")"	5:01
8.	"Schau in mein Herz ("Look Into My Heart")"	4:26
9.	"Kaltes Grab ("Cold Grave")"	6:21
10.	"Alles nur Lüge ("Everything's A Lie")" (feat. Kirsten Zahn)	4:36
11.	"Morgenrot ("Red Dawn")" (instrumental)	4:09
Total length:		52:02

Limited edition
No.	Title	Length
14.	"Das Tier (Orchestral Version)"	4:37
15.	"Das Tier (Orchestra-Only Version)"	4:37
Total length:		1:00:17

== Charts ==
Chart (2008)	Peak position
German Albums (Offizielle Top 100)	31
