= Through Yourself & Back Again =

Studio album by Thriving Ivory
- Released: September 14, 2010
- Recorded: 2009–2010
- Studio: Wind-up; Quad (New York City)
- Genre: Indie rock; pop rock
- Length: 40:06
- Label: Wind-up
- Producer: Thriving Ivory; Scott Jason; Mark Endert

Thriving Ivory chronology
Thriving Ivory (2003)	Through Yourself & Back Again (2010)

Professional ratings
Review scores
Source	Rating
AllMusic	2.5/5 stars

Through Yourself & Back Again is the second and final studio album by American rock band Thriving Ivory. The lead single from the album, Where We Belong, was released on May 10, 2010, via a special limited time YouTube video. The next day, May 11, the single was released on iTunes, and in stores everywhere May 19. On July 16, the band released the track listing via their Twitter account.

The title of the album comes from the second verse of the song "Moonlight". The lyrics say, "We're gonna let go and let ourselves be found. We're gonna set fire 'til we grow tired and burn our sorrows to the ground. I'm gonna take your hand 'til you're through yourself and back again. We'll be dancing in the moonlight."

== Promotion ==
On August 20, 2010, the band went on a 16-city fall tour with Ryan Star and Ed Kowalczyk to promote Through Yourself & Back Again ahead of its release, starting at Scottsdale's Martini Ranch and ending in Boston's Royale nightclub.

== Track listing ==
All tracks are written by Scott Jason (with Clayton Stroope), except where noted.

No.	Title	Writer(s)	Producer(s)	Length
1.	"Love Alone"	Scott Jason; Gregg Wattenberg; Clayton Stroope	Mark Endert	3:49
2.	"On Your Side"		Endert	3:54
3.	"Some Kind of Home"		Jason; Thriving Ivory	3:57
4.	"Where We Belong"	Jason; Wattenberg; Stroope	Endert	3:46
5.	"While the Candle Still Burns"		Jason; Thriving Ivory	3:15
6.	"Moonlight"		Jason; Thriving Ivory	4:20
7.	"Cobwebs"		Jason; Thriving Ivory	4:19
8.	"Run"		Jason; Thriving Ivory	4:22
9.	"Motorcade (So Long, So Long)"		Jason; Thriving Ivory	3:58
10.	"Come November"		Jason; Thriving Ivory	4:26

iTunes bonus track
No.	Title	Length
11.	"Moonlight (Acoustic Version)"	4:14

== Personnel ==
Adapted credits from the media notes of Through Yourself & Back Again.

Thriving Ivory

- Clayton Stroope – lead vocals
- Scott Jason – piano, keys
- Drew Cribley – guitars
- Paul Niedermier – drums, percussion

Additional musicians

- Jack Daley – bass guitar
- Curt Schneider – bass guitar (tracks 1, 2, 4)
- Scott Jason – strings (tracks 4, 5)
- Gregg Wattenberg – string arrangement (track 4)
- David Eggar – cello, string arrangement (track 4)
- Lorenza Ponce – violin, string arrangement (track 5)

Production

- Mark Endert – mixing, additional programming
- Brian Montgomery – mixing, digital editing (tracks 6, 8), additional engineering
- Doug Johnson – digital editing (tracks 1, 2, 4)
- Vic Florencia – mixing (track 8)
- Chris Shaw – engineering (tracks 1, 2, 4)
- Ross Petersen – mixing (track 6), additional engineering
- John Alicastro – additional engineering
- Stephen Marcussen – mastering

Artwork

- Bethany Crowley – art direction
- Michelle Lukianovich – art direction, package design
- Joe Garrad – photography
- Julee Duwe – back tray photo

== Charts ==
Chart (2010)	Peak position
US Billboard 200	131
US Heatseekers Albums (Billboard)	2
US Top Rock Albums (Billboard)	46
