= Megaherz =

German metal band

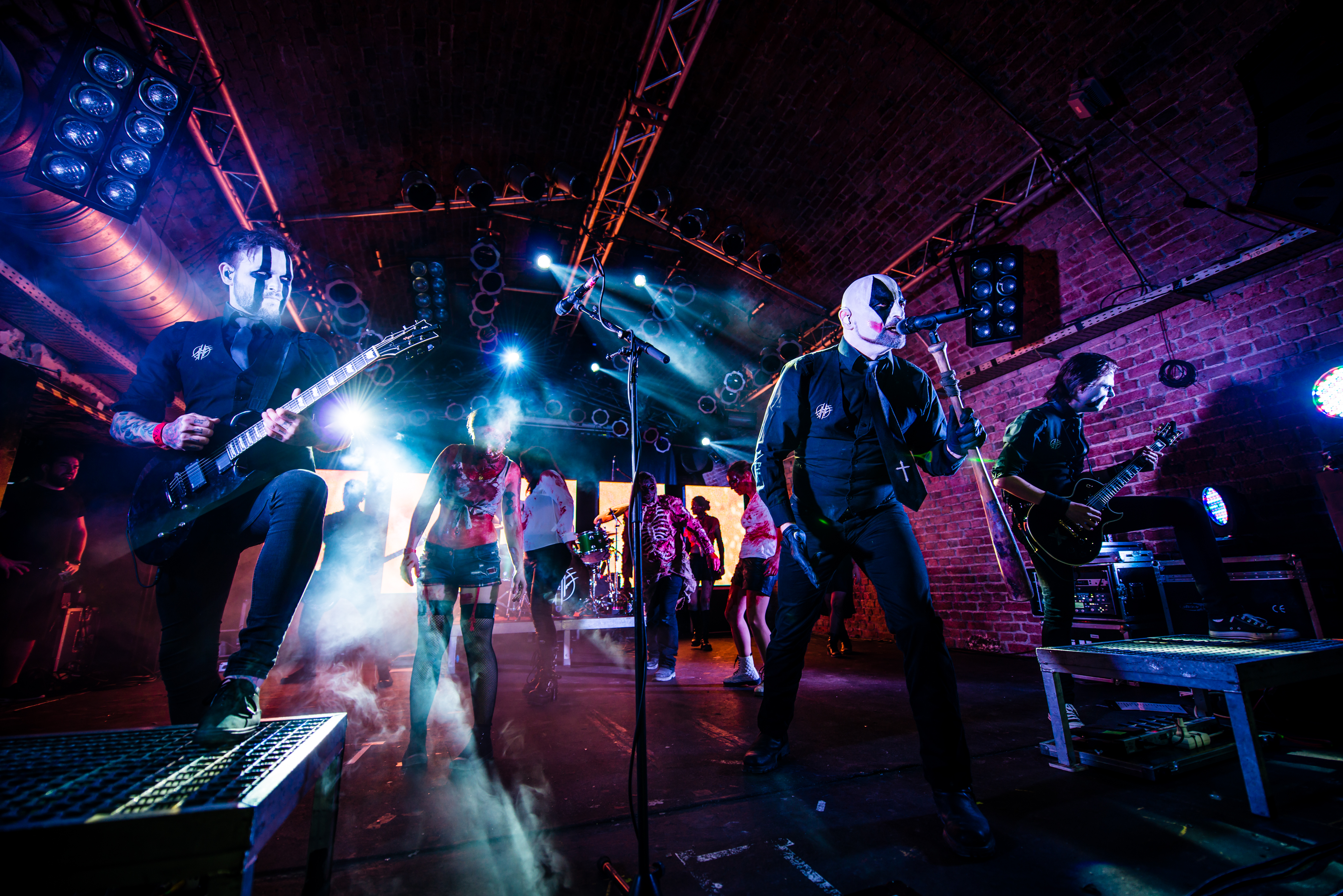
- Megaherz in 2016

Background information
- Origin: Eichenau, Germany
- Genres: Neue Deutsche Härte, industrial metal
- Years active: 1993–present
- Labels: Napalm; ZYX; Eclipse; Sony BMG
- Members: Alexander "Lex" Wohnhaas; Christian "X-ti" Bystron; Wenz "Wenz" Weninger; Christoph "Chris" Klinke; Maxx Hertweck
- Past members: Alexander "Alexx" Wesselsky; Noel Pix; Marc Bredtmann; Josef Kalleder; Tobias Trinkl; Christian Scharinger; Mathias "Jablonski" Elsholz; Oliver Pohl; Jürgen Zink; Frank Gegerle; Roland Vencelj; Jürgen "Bam Bam" Wiehler; Rolf Herring
- Website: megaherz.de

Megaherz (German name meaning "Mega-heart", a pun on the homophone "megahertz") is a German Neue Deutsche Härte band formed in Eichenau in 1993.

Megaherz has gone through many changes in musical style since their founding. Their early works can be categorized as dark alternative metal, comparable to 1990s American bands such as Faith No More, whereas recent works are comparable to bands such as Oomph! and Rammstein. Their early albums all include at least one song based on a classic German fairy tale, including "Hänschen klein" ("Little Hans") on Herzwerk, "Rapunzel" on Kopfschuss, "Windkind" ("Wind Child") on Himmelfahrt, and "I.M Rumpelstilzchen" on Herzwerk II.

The band has had many changes in line-up since its formation in 1993. Guitarist Christian Bystron and bassist Wenz Weninger have been the band's only consistent members since 1995. Since vocalist Alexander Wesselsky's departure in 2003, no founding member has remained in the band.

== History ==
=== Formation and early success (1993–2002) ===
Megaherz began as a musical project of Alexx Wesselsky, Josef Kalleder, Marc Bredtmann, and Tobias Trinkl. In 1995, they released a self-published demo album titled Herzwerk.

Christian "X-ti" Bystron joined the band while they were touring for Herzwerk. After a few rehearsals, bassist Kalleder quit and was subsequently replaced by Wenz Weninger. Both Bredtmann and Trinkl left the band soon after. The now trio of Alexx, X-ti and Wenz released the first studio album Wer bist du? in 1997, with a completely different sound, inspired by Clawfinger and incorporating electronic and rap elements that would become a staple in future albums.

Noel Pix had helped with the keyboards and programming on Wer bist du?, but joined the band full time on keyboards for the second album, Kopfschuss, released in 1998. The single "Freiflug" was released in 1999 to further promote Kopfschuss; it became Megaherz's most successful single to date, peaking at No. 7 on the Deutsche Alternative Charts.

Kopfschuss was followed by Himmelfahrt (2000) and became the band's debut album on the Media Control Charts, peaking at No. 78. Herzwerk II, released in 2002, had similar success, also reaching No. 78 on the German charts. In October 2002, vocalist Wesselsky announced that he was leaving the band due to creative differences. He would finish the 2002 tour before officially leaving the band on 1 January 2003 and forming the group Eisbrecher with Noel Pix. Since Wesselsky's departure, there are no remaining founding members left.

=== The search for a lead singer (2003–2007) ===
In April 2003, the remaining members announced the new singer, Mathias "Jablonski" Elsholz of the band Twelve After Elf. Elsholz was already familiar to the band's fans, as his vocals had been briefly featured on the track "Falsche Götter" from the album Himmelfahrt. By June 2004, a new album was under way. A new song was soon released with a small Macromedia Flash animation, substantiating the rumors of a new singer. This song was later revealed to be "Zeig' mir dein Gesicht" from the album 5, which was released on 6 December 2004.

On 23 September 2005, the rest of the tours for the year were cancelled, as Elsholz left in "total surprise" to the band. The reason was not given on the Megaherz homepage, but, in the Eisbrecher forums. Elsholz announced that he and his wife were expecting twins, and he wished to devote more time to his soon-to-be family. 5 was released in the US via Eclipse Records on 21 February 2006.

On 18 April 2007, it was confirmed on Megaherz's official website that the band found a new singer and was working on their sixth record. It was also stated that the band would tour while recording their new album.

=== Lex Wohnhaas officially joins (2007–2010) ===
By 18 August 2007, the band's new line-up was announced, and the website was re-launched. Lex Wohnhaas from the band Seelenbrand was announced as the new singer, and Jürgen "Bam Bam" Wiehler from the band Bonfire was replacing Jürgen Zink. Lex previously played for Megaherz during a concert in Moscow just after Elsholz left.

The new album, Heuchler, was released in July 2008. After its release, it reached position No. 31 on the German Album Charts. The band played at the Summer Breeze Open Air festival in August 2008 and continued touring in 2009, playing at the Wave-Gotik-Treffen festival in Leipzig, Germany.

A compilation album was released in early March 2009, titled Totgesagte leben länger ("Those declared dead live longer", a line from "Dein Herz schlägt" from the album 5).

The band released their first remix album, Loblieder, on 1 April 2010, featuring remixes by artists such as Die Krupps, Suicide Commando, Rotersand, Letzte Instanz, and Staubkind.

=== Götterdämmerung, Zombieland and Erdwärts (2010–2017) ===
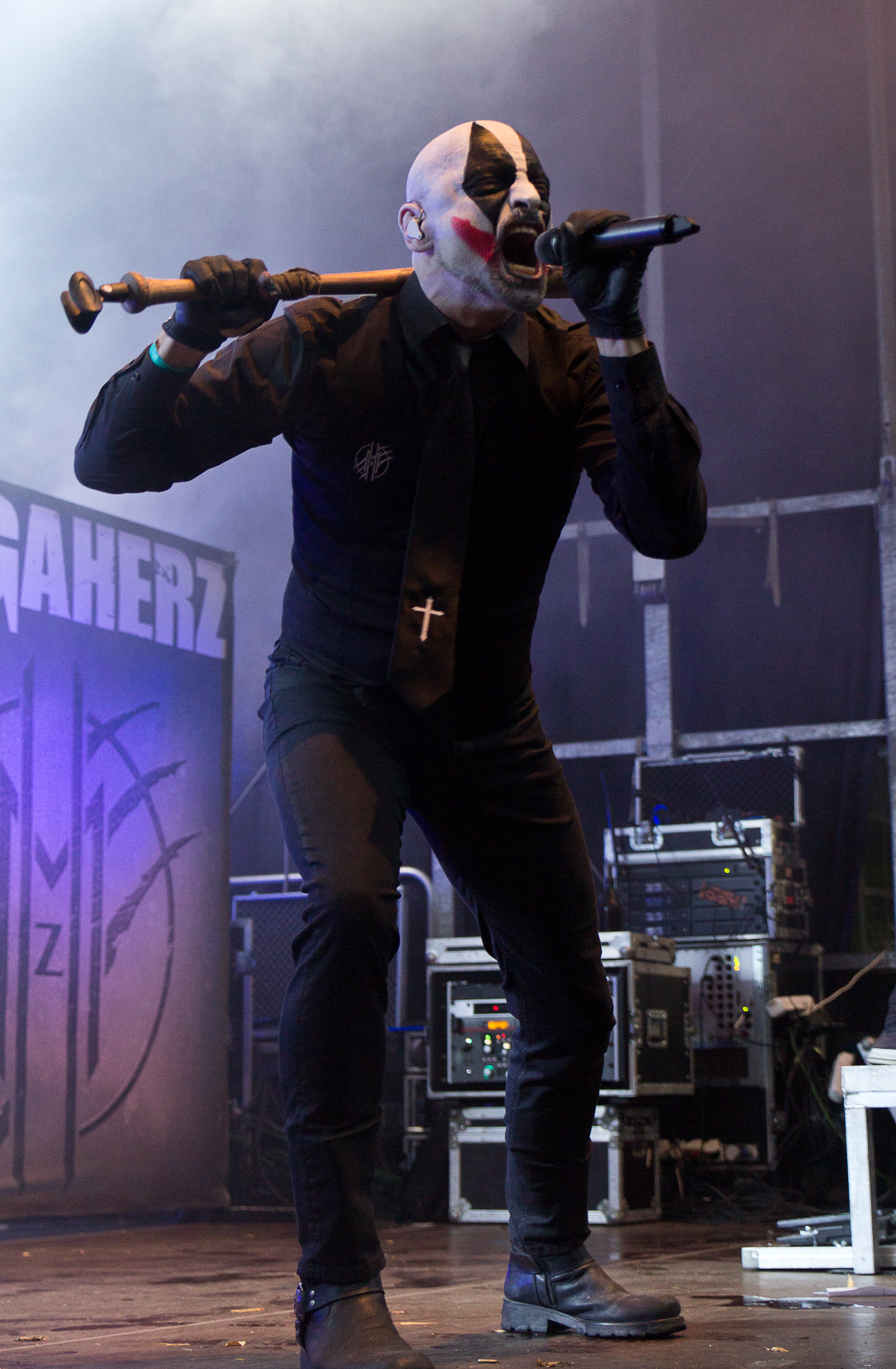
Singer Alexander "Lex" Wohnhaas at Nocturnal Culture Night festival 2016

By 22 December 2010, Megaherz were back in the studio working on their seventh album. On 18 April 2011, they announced that Christoph Klinke from 'From Constant Visions' was the band's new rhythm guitarist, replacing Roland Vencelj.

Announced on their official website on 24 May 2011, Megaherz was scheduled to release their new album on 14 October 2011, but by 20 August, it was announced that the release date for the new album has been moved to early December. Afterwards, an announcement on the band's website on 22 September 2011 stated: "In coordination with our record company, GoldenCore Records/ZYX Music, we decided to postpone the release of our new album finally to January 20th, 2012". Megaherz would also mention that the new album will feature 11 songs, and that one of the new songs will become available for download in October 2011.

Megaherz went on tour with Subway to Sally and Letzte Instanz in December 2011 before embarking on their own national tour in early 2012 to promote the new album.

The first single, "Jagdzeit", was released on 23 December 2011. The new album, Götterdämmerung, was released on 20 January 2012, and hit the German Media Control Charts at No. 19. Megaherz played at Wacken Open Air festival on 2 August, as well as Mera Luna Festival on 11 August 2012.

Megaherz released their first concert DVD on 16 November 2012, titled Götterdämmerung: Wacken Live.

The song "Gegen den Wind" was released on 25 January 2013 as the second single to the band's album Götterdämmerung.

The band announced on their official website on 20 January 2014 that they were working on a new album. By the end of February, the band announced that they had signed with a new record company, Napalm Records. The new album, Zombieland, was released on 24 October 2014 and would chart in the Media Control Charts at No. 17.

Megaherz then went on a tour with Unheilig, as support for their Gipfelstürmer Open Air Tour, between June and September 2015.

Megaherz would then release a new EP titled Erdwärts on 4 December 2015, followed by a tour across Russia, Germany, Austria, and Switzerland between December 2015 and April 2016. The EP consists of four new songs and two re-recorded tracks ("Jordan" and "Teufel"), both songs previously released on the band's 1998 album Kopfschuss.

Megaherz once again went on tour with Unheilig between May and July 2016 as a supporting act during Unheilig's Ein Letzte Mal Tournee. Though Megaherz did not play any support shows for Unheilig in August, Megaherz was one of four supporting acts for the tour finale at RheinEnergieStadion on 10 September 2016.

Megaherz then embarked on the second leg of the Erdwärts Club Tour between November 2016 and January 2017.

=== Tour in China, Komet and departure of Jürgen "Bam Bam" Wiehler (2017–2019) ===
On 9 January 2017, after the "Erdwärts Tour" finale, the band announced that they have entered the studio to record their next studio album.

The band went on a four-date tour in China for the very first time in the bands 20+ year career in May 2017 playing in four cities, including Beijing. Megaherz opened for Marilyn Manson on 22 July 2017 at Woodstage Open Air Festival in Dresden, Germany.

Komet was revealed as the title of the upcoming 10th album scheduled to be released in February 2018.

Longtime drummer Jürgen Wiehler left the band in February 2018; Tobias Derer, was later announced as his replacement. Derer's run with the band was short lived, as he left in April 2018. The band officially announced his departure in July 2018 and welcomed Rolf Herring on board as the new drummer.

Komet would turn out to be Megaherz's highest-charting album to date, reaching number 7 on the German charts.

=== In Teufels Namen (2019–present) ===
In August 2019, Megaherz announced that they have begun work on a new studio album, originally aimed for a release in 2020.

On August 14, 2021, Megaherz announced via Facebook that drummer Rolf Hering would be leaving that band and joining medieval metal band Feuerschwanz. On April 6, 2022, they revealed that Maxx Hertweck was the new drummer of the band.

On August 11, 2023, their eleventh studio album In Teufel's Namen was released.

== Musical style ==
Megaherz primarily plays a style of Neue Deutsche Härte, a subgenre of industrial metal, which incorporates elements of groove metal, techno, and German rock. Megaherz makes use of clean and deep male vocals, heavy riffs, samples, keyboard, and synthesizer effects. During the early days of the band, Megaherz played an alternative metal style in the vein of Faith No More. Their albums Wer bist du? and Kopfschuss took on a rap metal and funk metal style, which included slap bass riffs and rapping.

== Members ==
Megaherz live at With Full Force 2018

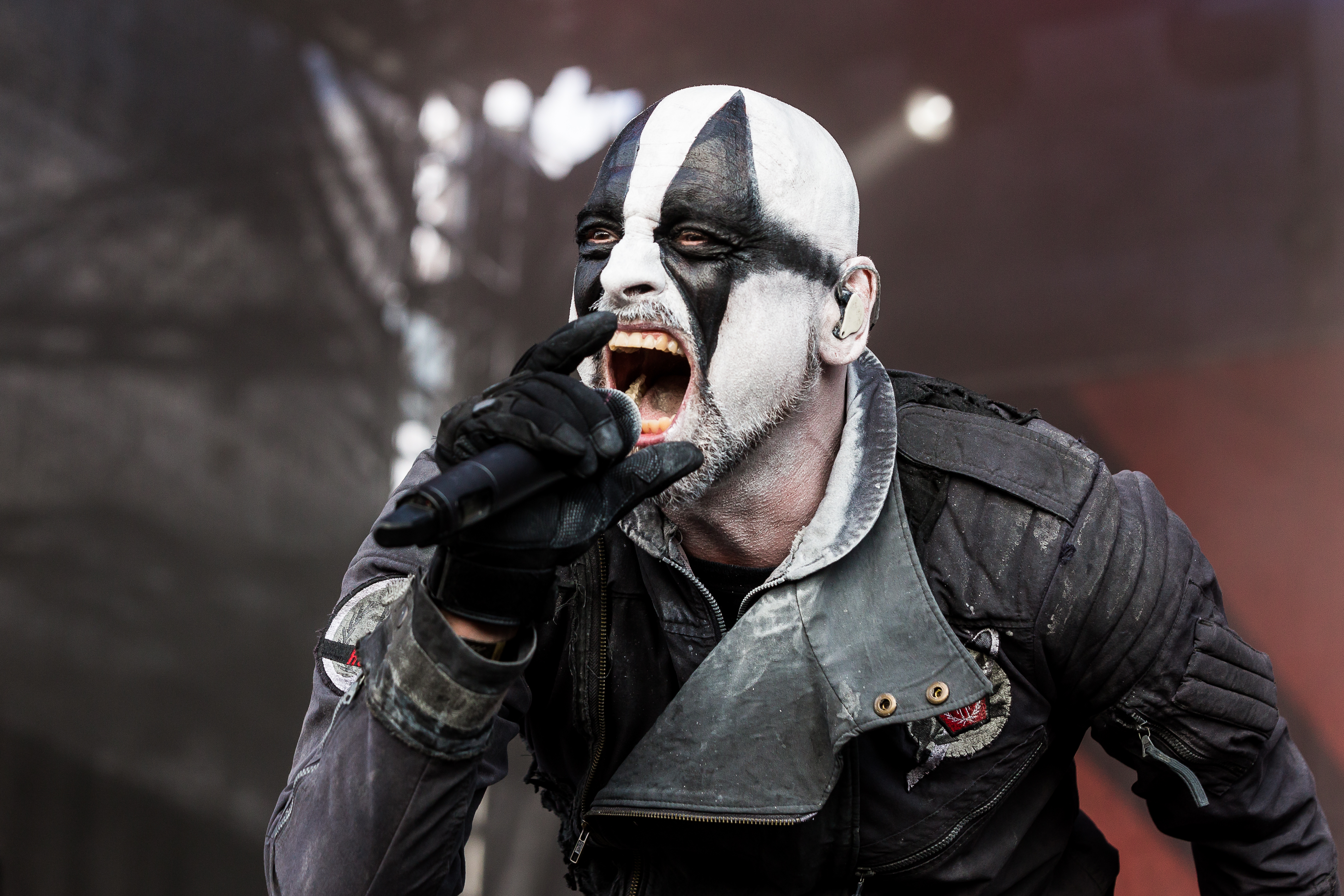
Alexander Wohnhaas

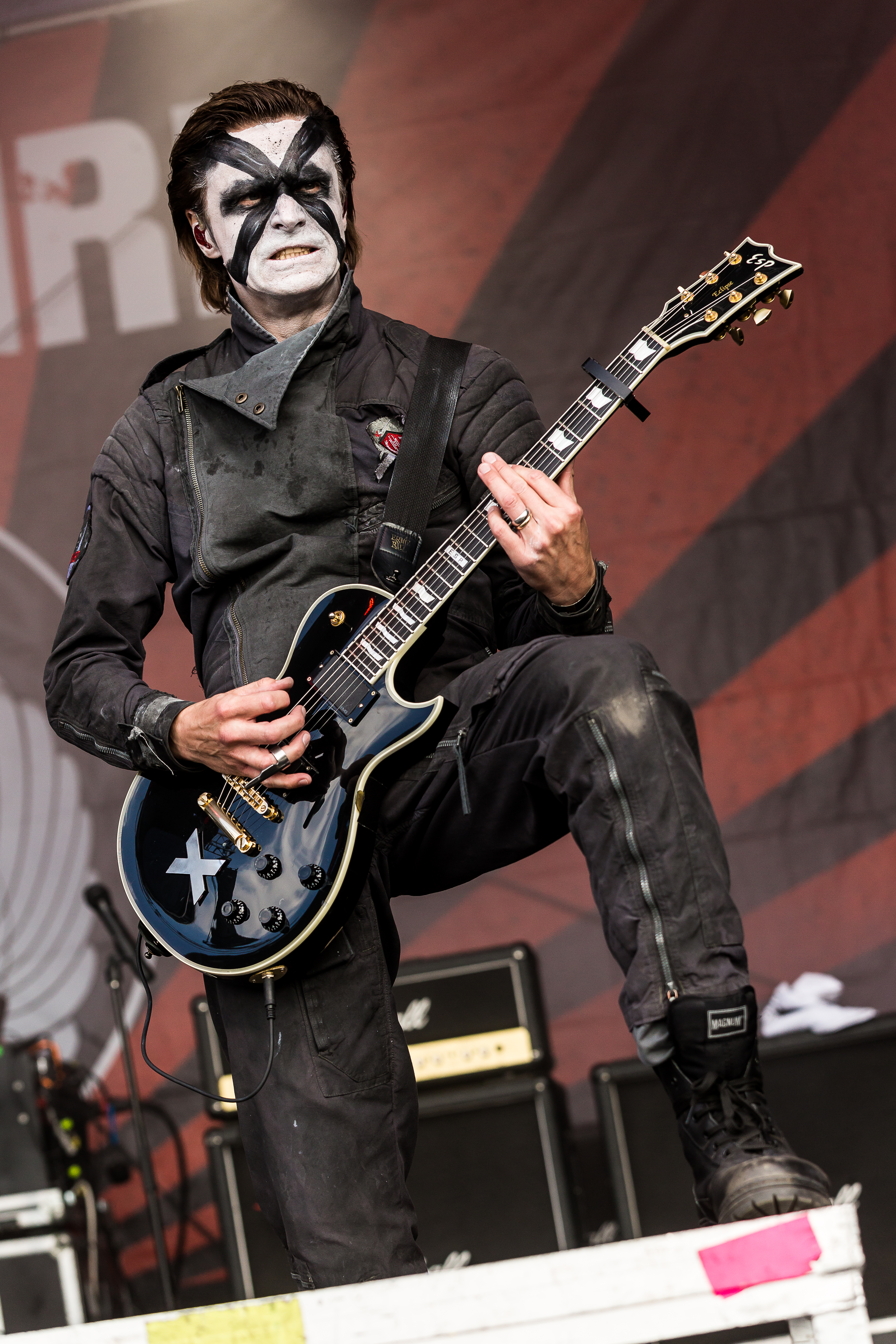
Christian Bystron

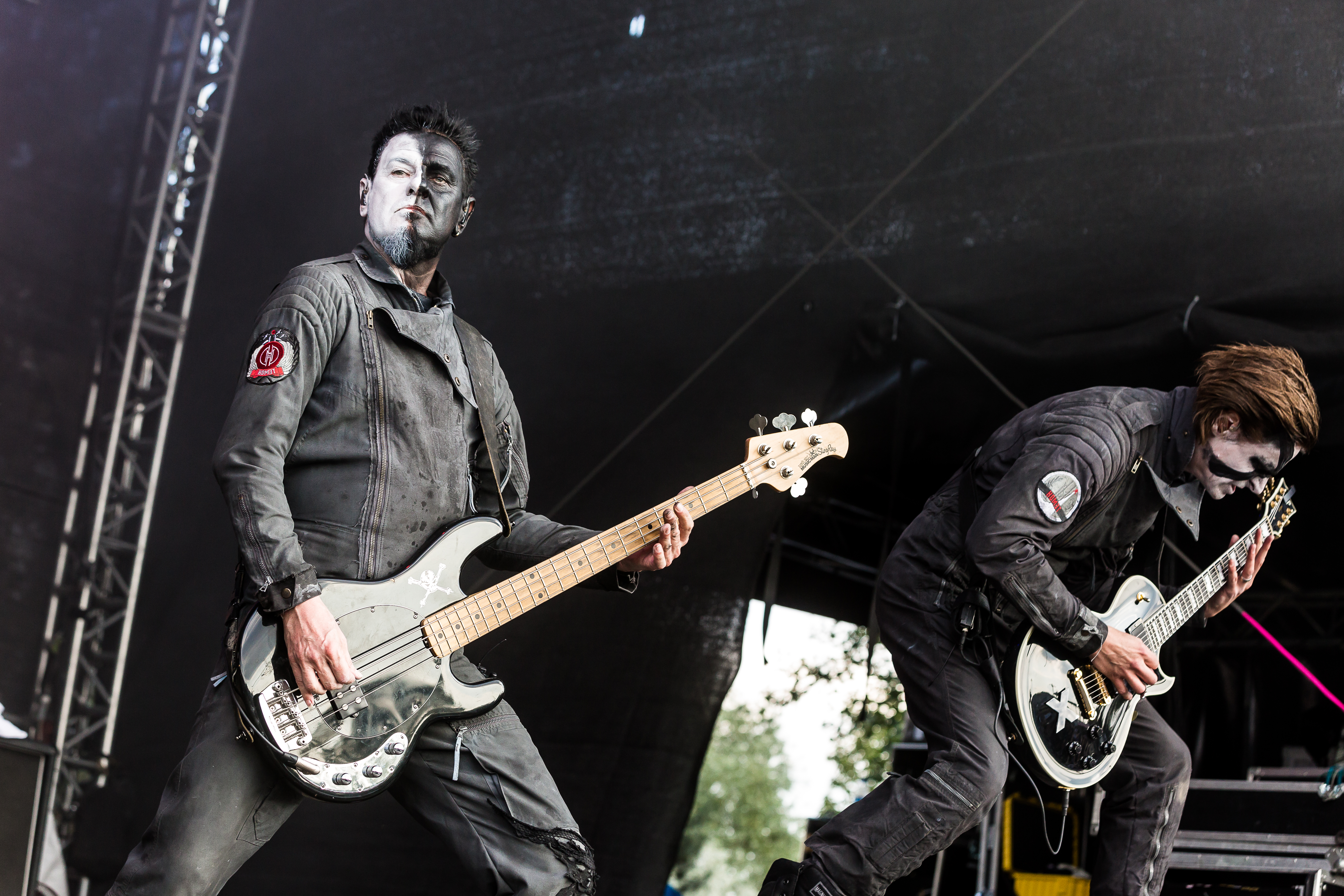
Wenz Weniger (left)

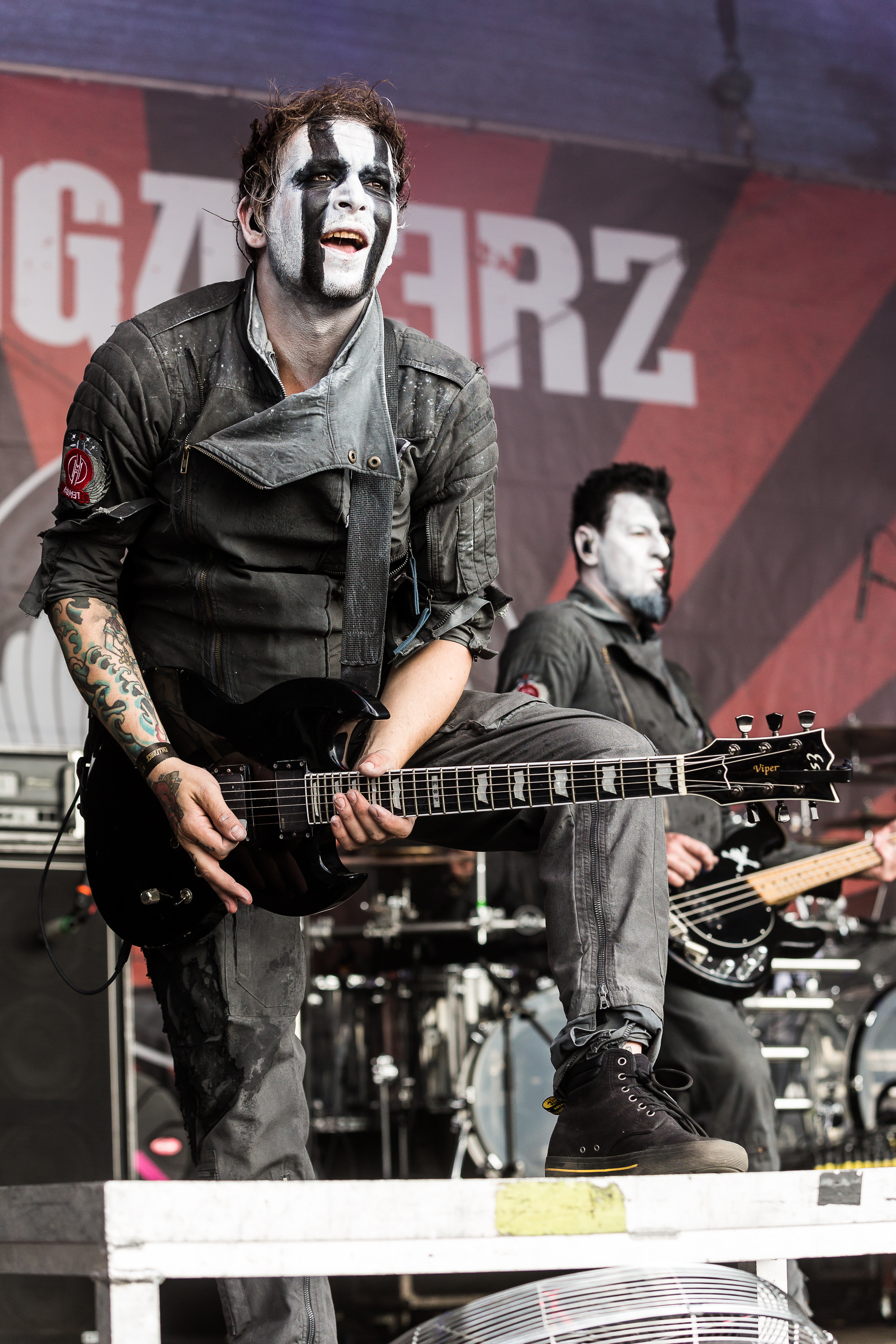
Christoph Klinke

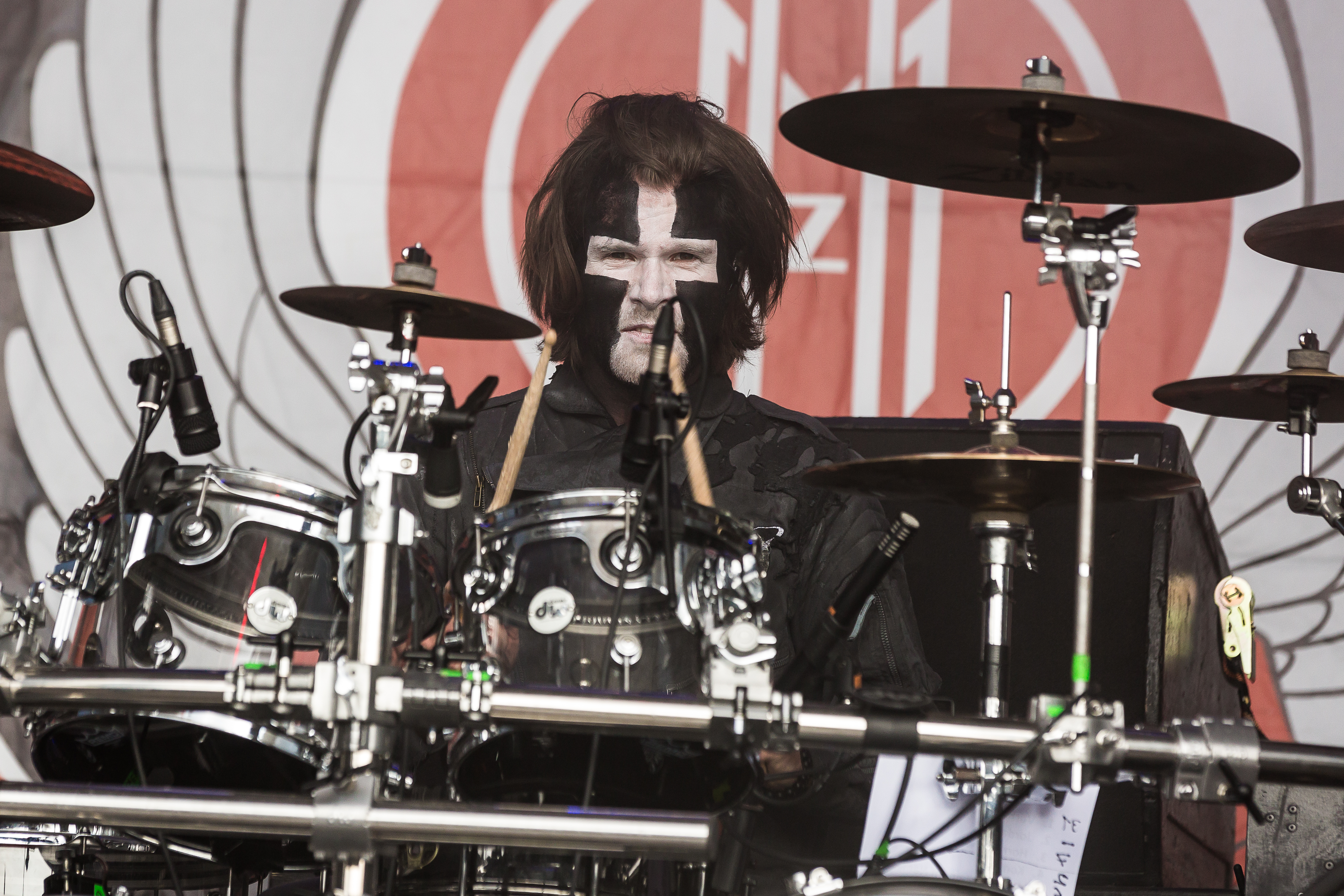
Tobias Derer

=== Current members ===
- Alexander "Lex" Wohnhaas – vocals (2007–present)
- Christian "X-ti" Bystron – lead guitar (1997–present), programming (2002–present)
- Wenz Weninger – bass (1997–present)
- Maxx Hertweck – drums (2022–present)
- Christoph "Chris" Klinke – rhythm guitar (2011–present)

=== Former members ===
- Alexander "Alexx" Wesselsky – vocals (1993–2003)
- Mathias "Jablonski" Elsholz – vocals (2003–2005)
- Jochen "Noel Pix" Seibert – guitar, keyboards, programming (1998–2001)
- Christian Scharinger – keyboards, programming (1995–1997)
- Josef Kalleder – bass (1993–1995)
- Roland Vencelj – guitar (2007–2011)
- Oliver Pohl – guitar (2002–2003)
- Marc Bredtmann – guitar (1993–1995)
- Rolf Herring – drums (2018–2021)
- Tobias Derer – drums (2018)
- Jürgen "Bam Bam" Wiehler – drums (2007–2018)
- Jürgen Zink – drums (2003–2007)
- Jürgen Schlachter – drums (2002–2003)
- Frank Gegerle – drums (1998–2001, touring 2005)
- Tommy Eberhard – drums (1997–1998)
- Tobias Trinkl – drums (1993–1995)

== Discography ==
=== Studio albums ===
Year	Title	Chart positions		
Year	Title	GER	AUT	SWI
1995	Herzwerk ("Heart-work")	-	-	-
1997	Wer bist du? ("Who are you?")	-	-	-
1998	Kopfschuss ("Headshot")	-	-	-
2000	Himmelfahrt ("Ascension")	78	-	-
2002	Herzwerk II ("Heart-work II")	78	-	-
2004	5	-	-	-
2008	Heuchler ("Hypocrite")	31	-	-
2012	Götterdämmerung ("Twilight of the Gods")	19	-	-
2014	Zombieland	17	75	68
2018	Komet ("Comet")	7	49	43
2023	In Teufels Namen ("In the devil's name")	16	-	53

=== Remix albums ===
- 2010: Loblieder

=== Singles ===
- 1997: "Gott sein"
- 1998: "Rock Me Amadeus"
- 1998: "Liebestöter"
- 1999: "Freiflug"
- 2000: "Himmelfahrt"
- 2002: "Herzblut"
- 2004: "Gott sein '04" (non-physical release)
- 2004: "Dein Herz schlägt" (non-physical release)
- 2008: "Mann von Welt"
- 2011: "Jagdzeit"
- 2013: "Gegen den Wind"
- 2014: "Wir könnten Götter sein"
- 2017: "Vorhang auf"
- 2018: "Komet"
- 2018: "Von oben"
- 2023: "Alles Arschlöcher"
- 2023: "Engelsgesicht"
- 2023: "In Teufels Namen"

=== EPs ===
- 2007: Freiflug EP: The Early Years (1996–2000)
- 2008: Mann von Welt
- 2008: Heuchler
- 2011: Jagdzeit
- 2015: Erdwärts

=== Compilation albums ===
- 2001: Querschnitt
- 2009: Totgesagte leben länger

=== Music videos ===
- 1999: "Freiflug"
- 2011: "Jagdzeit"
- 2013: "Herz aus Gold"
- 2014: "Himmelsstürmer"
- 2014: "Für immer"
- 2016: "Einsam"
- 2017: "Vorhang auf!"
- 2018: "Komet"
- 2018: "Nicht genug"
- 2023: "Alles Arschlöcher"
- 2023: "Engelsgesicht"
