= Götterdämmerung (Megaherz album) =

2012 studio album by Megaherz

Studio album by Megaherz
- Released: 20 January 2012
- Genre: Neue Deutsche Härte, industrial metal
- Length: 49:44 (standard edition); 58:39 (limited edition)
- Label: ZYX Music

Megaherz chronology
| Heuchler (2008) | Götterdämmerung (2012) | Zombieland (2014) |

Singles from Götterdämmerung
- 1. "Jagdzeit" Released: 23 December 2011

Götterdämmerung (German for "Twilight of the Gods") is the seventh studio album by German industrial metal band Megaherz, released on 20 January 2012. It is the first album by the band to feature Christoph Klinke as a guitarist.

== Track listing ==
All music is composed by Megaherz, except track 4, which was released by an older lineup.

| No. | Title | Length |
|---|---|---|
| 1. | "Jagdzeit ("Hunting Time")" | 4:16 |
| 2. | "Heute Nacht ("Tonight")" | 5:43 |
| 3. | "Keine Zeit ("No Time")" | 3:50 |
| 4. | "Das Licht am Ende der Welt ("The Light at the Edge of the World")" (from the album Himmelfahrt) | 4:29 |
| 5. | "Rabenvater ("Cruel Father")" | 3:58 |
| 6. | "Prellbock ("Buffer")" | 4:11 |
| 7. | "Mann im Mond ("Man in the Moon")" | 5:15 |
| 8. | "Feindbild ("Bogeyman")" | 4:42 |
| 9. | "Herz aus Gold ("Heart of Gold")" | 5:29 |
| 10. | "Abendstern ("Evening Star")" | 3:44 |
| 11. | "Kopf oder Zahl ("Heads or Tails")" | 4:07 |
| Total length: | | 49:44 |

Limited edition
| No. | Title | Length |
|---|---|---|
| 12. | "Jagdzeit [Grendel Remix]" | 4:47 |
| 13. | "Jagdzeit [Blitzkid Gunnar's Predator Remix]" | 4:02 |
| Total length: | | 58:39 |

== Charts ==
| Chart (2012) | Peak position |
|---|---|
| German Albums (Offizielle Top 100) | 19 |
