= Komet (album) =

2018 studio album by Megaherz

Studio album by Megaherz
- Released: 23 February 2018 (EU)
- Genre: Neue Deutsche Härte, industrial metal
- Length: 44:07
- Label: Napalm Records

Megaherz chronology
Zombieland (2014)	Komet (2018)	In Teufels Namen (2023)

Singles from Komet
- 1. "Vorhang Auf" Released: December 22, 2017; 2. "Komet" Released: January 12, 2018; 3. "Von Oben" Released: February 16, 2018

Komet is the ninth studio album by German rock band Megaherz, released in February 2018. It is the highest-charting album by the band to date.

== Track listing ==
No.	Title	Length
1.	"Vorhang Auf (Curtain Up)"	3:54
2.	"Komet (Comet)"	4:06
3.	"Scherben Bringen Glück (Shards Bring Luck)"	3:54
4.	"Horrorclown (Horror Clown)"	3:52
5.	"Von Oben (From Above)"	4:53
6.	"Tiefenrausch (Ecstasy of the Abyss)"	3:27
7.	"Schwarz Oder Weiß (Black or White)"	3:53
8.	"Heldengrab (Heroes' Grave)"	3:58
9.	"Nicht In Meinem Namen (Not in my Name)"	3:44
10.	"Trau Dich (I Dare You)"	3:48
11.	"Nicht Genug (Not Enough)"	4:38
Total length:		44:07

== Reception ==
The album has received generally positive reviews. Loudersound.com gave the album a 3.5/5, saying "Rammstein’s industrial contemporaries pack a weightier punch". Webzine Distorted Sound gave the album a 8/10, saying "Overall, Megaherz have demonstrated that yet again, they understand industrial metal as a genre inside and out. Here on Komet, they masterfully play within the limits of what can be done with the genre, and often cross completely out of those boundaries altogether". Metalhammer.it gave the album an 80/100 too, saying "Megaherz always keep the rudder straight on the NDH canons".

== Charts ==
Chart (2018)	Peak position
Austrian Albums (Ö3 Austria)	49
German Albums (Offizielle Top 100)	7
Swiss Albums (Schweizer Hitparade)	43
