= Thriving Ivory =

American rock band

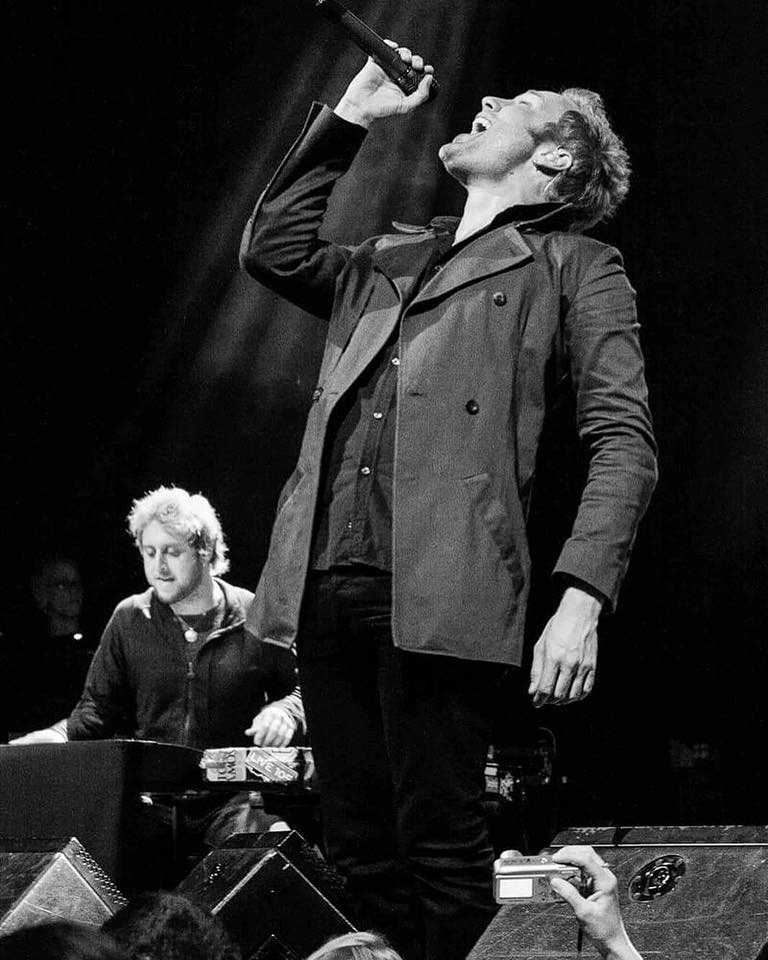

Background information
- Origin: San Francisco, California
- Genres: Indie rock, pop rock
- Years active: 2002 – 2011, 2016 – 2018
- Members: Clayton Stroope; Scott Jason; Drew Cribley; Paul Niedermier; Bret Cohune

Thriving Ivory was an American rock band based in the San Francisco Bay area. They released their self-titled Wind-up Records debut album on June 24, 2008. The debut album reached number 1 on the Billboard Heatseekers chart on the strength of the charting single "Angels on the Moon". After half a year, "Angels on the Moon" appeared on the US Pop 100 Chart, reaching number 28. Several songs off of the record were recorded with award-winning producer Howard Benson.

The band was featured as a VH1 You Oughta Know Artist and won the Yahoo! Music: Who's Next? User's Choice Competition. In 2009 they performed their single "Angels on the Moon" on Jimmy Kimmel Live! and The Rachael Ray Show. Early in 2010 their first single "Angels on The Moon" went certified Gold in the US selling over 500,000 copies. Their second studio album, Through Yourself & Back Again was released on September 14, 2010. The record was co-produced by Thriving Ivory, Gregg Wattenberg, and Grammy award-winning producer/mixer Mark Endert.

The band took a hiatus from 2010-2016 to explore other opportunities and eventually ended their relationship with Wind Up Records. Original founding guitar player Andrew Cribley began to pursue other musical and creative outlets in the San Francisco Bay Area, while original founding drummer Paul Neidermier took a break from the band to focus on his family and other pursuits. In the summer of 2016, founding members, Scott Jason and Clayton Stroope began working on new material for what would be their first new release since 2010. After announcing this on social media the band was approached by Jeremy Lopez of the management firm Lippman Entertainment; however, shortly thereafter they decided to separate.

Both Scott and Clayton have announced on their social media plans for moving forward but in different directions. Scott Jason subsequently launched a solo project under the name Scott Jason Through A Telescope and has released new songs on all digital platforms.

Scott also volunteers for the 501(c)(3) non-profit Angels on the Moon and plays the occasional show, some of which help raise money for Angels on the Moon.

In the fall of 2018 Clayton Stroope was signed by the Los Angeles–based publishing firm Riptide Music Group. He has since released an EP under the project name City Wolf, and has had tracks licensed by Amazon Prime, Fox Sports, Hulu, Marvel, Netflix, Activision, TNT, NISSAN, and NBC. He is currently collaborating on new project with licensing music veteran, rapper Easy McCoy, for the Los Angeles–based publishing/licensing firm Position Music. The duo was signed by United Talent Agency in the summer of 2020.

In early 2021 Clayton teamed up with veteran writer/producer, and co-founder of the band OneRepublic, Tim Myers, on a solo album also set for release with Position Music.

== Members ==
- Clayton Stroope – Lead vocals
- Scott Jason – Songwriter, Piano, Keys
- Drew Cribley – Guitar
- Bret Cohune – Bass guitar
- Paul Niedermier – Drums

== Discography ==
=== Studio albums ===
Year	Album details	Peak chart positions		
Year	Album details	US	US Heat	US Rock
2003	Thriving Ivory: Release date: May 18, 2003; Label: Wolfgang Records	—	—	—
2008	Thriving Ivory (re-issue): Release date: June 24, 2008; Label: Wind-Up Records	102	1	—
2010	Through Yourself & Back Again: Release date: September 14, 2010; Label: Wind-Up Records	131	2	46
"—" denotes releases that did not chart

=== EPs ===
- Thriving Ivory EP (2003)
- Secret Life EP (2004)
- Rhapsody Originals EP (2008)
- Tell Me Your Name EP (2009)

=== Singles ===
Year	Single	Peak chart positions				Certifications (sales threshold)	Album
Year	Single	US	US Adult	US Pop	CAN	Certifications (sales threshold)	Album
2008	"Our December"	—	—	—	—		Non-album single
2008	"Angels on the Moon"	75	20	28	46	US: Gold	Thriving Ivory
2009	"Hey Lady"	—	—	—	—		Thriving Ivory
2009	"Flowers for a Ghost"	—	—	—	—		Thriving Ivory
2010	"Where We Belong"	—	—	—	—		Through Yourself & Back Again
"—" denotes releases that did not chart

== Music videos ==
Year	Video	Director
2008	"Angels on the Moon"	
2009	"Hey Lady"	
2010	"Where We Belong"	Roman White
