= And One =

German new wave, synthpop and EBM band

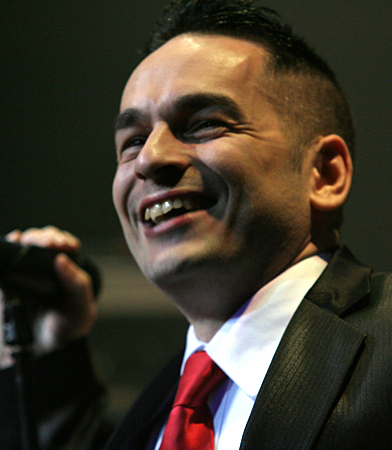
- Steve Naghavi in 2008

Background information
- Origin: Germany
- Genres: Synth-pop, New wave, EBM, Futurepop
- Years active: 1989–present
- Labels: Machinery; Energy; Virgin; Metropolis; Out of Line Music; Synthetic Symfony/SPV
- Members: Steve Naghavi; Joke Jay; Nico Wieditz
- Past members: Chris Ruiz; Gio van Oli; Annelie Bertilsson; Alex Two; Rick Schah
- Website: www.andone.de

And One is a German synth-pop, new wave, and EBM band founded by Steve Naghavi and Chris Ruiz in 1989.

== History ==
The band formed after Steve Naghavi and Chris Ruiz met in 1989 at a Berlin club. Being fans of early EBM music, Naghavi and Ruiz decided to follow in the footsteps of new wave/synthpop band Depeche Mode by using two keyboards and a beatbox. Jason Ankeny of AllMusic called their 1990 single "Metal Hammer" a "significant club hit". The duo became a trio with the addition of Alex Two, prior to the release of their debut album, Anguish in 1991. That same year, they were honored as the Best New Artist in western Germany.

Going into the release of Anguish, they had already garnered a decent following through touring and appearances at various parties. With their debut release, they took home the Best New Artist award in Germany in 1991. Chris Ruiz left in 1992 (he would later return in 2001) while Steve Naghavi remained with the band. And One released three more albums with Machinery Records, Flop! (1992), Spot (1993) and I.S.T. (1994). The band left Machinery around 1996–1997 and signed to Virgin Schallplatten. And One would release four albums on this label between 1997 and 2003: Nordhausen (1997), 9.9.99 9 Uhr (1998), Virgin Superstar (2000) and Aggressor (2003).

The next And One album, Bodypop, was released on 1 September 2006 by Out of Line in Europe and on 7 November 2006 on Metropolis Records in the US. The single "Military Fashion Show" preceded the album. An EP, Frontfeuer would also be released shorty after Bodypop in 2006. The following year, the band pulled out of their 2007 US tour with VNV Nation for unknown reasons.

In November 2007, And One announced the release of Bodypop 1½, an EP with covers of songs by Depeche Mode ("Never Let Me Down Again"), Front 242 ("Operating Tracks"), D.A.F. ("Der Mussolini"), Nitzer Ebb ("I Give to You") and The Cure ("Kyoto Song"). Three weeks later, the EP was cancelled and a full-length cover album announced. The album was finally released on 30 January 2009, but with a completely different track listing, featuring live cover versions of various synthpop hits such as New Order's "Blue Monday" and Pet Shop Boys' "It's a Sin".

The band's next album, Tanzomat, was released on March 4, 2011. An EP, Zerstörer was released on January 21 prior to the album that same year, with two songs being included in the album's release.

On June 4, 2011, Chris Ruiz and Gio van Oli announced they were leaving And One; they formed a new band called PAKT featuring Chad Hauger. Four days later, on June 8, 2011, Steve Naghavi announced the return of both Joke Jay and Rick Schah via the band's official Facebook page. The band's new album, S.T.O.P., was released on May 25, 2012. Two singles have been released to promote the record.

On August 8, 2014, And One released their 12th studio album Magnet. The album was released by itself, and as the Magnet Trilogie I Box in regular and limited editions on C.D. and vinyl. The Magnet Trilogie I Box features the additional new albums Propeller and Achtung 80. The Premium Edition contains all 3 albums, and 3 additional live albums of the And One Forever Tour 2014 as follows: Disc 1 - Propeller "Live". Disc 2 - Magnet "Live". And Disc 3 - Achtung 80 "Live".

== Members ==
=== Current ===
- Steve Naghavi – vocals, keyboards (1989–present)
- Joke Jay – drums (1992–2001, 2011–present)
- Nico Wieditz – keyboards (2012–present)

=== Former ===
- Chris Ruiz – keyboards (1989–1992, 2001–2011)
- Alex Two – keyboards (1992–1993)
- Rick Schah – keyboards (1993–2001, 2011–2022)
- Annelie Bertilsson – vocals (2000–2001)
- Gio van Oli – keyboards (2002–2011)

== Discography ==
=== Studio albums ===
- 1991: Anguish
- 1992: Flop!
- 1993: Spot
- 1994: I.S.T.
- 1997: Nordhausen
- 1998: 9.9.99 9 Uhr
- 2000: Virgin Superstar
- 2003: Aggressor
- 2006: Bodypop
- 2011: Tanzomat
- 2012: S.T.O.P.
- 2014: Magnet
- 2014: Propeller
- 2014: Achtung 80

== See also ==
- Electronic body music
- Synth-pop
