= Thriving Ivory (album) =

Studio album by Thriving Ivory
- Released: May 18, 2003
- Recorded: 2002–2003
- Genre: Alternative rock; pop rock; indie rock; power pop
- Length: 47:54
- Label: Wolfgang; Wind-up
- Producer: Chris Manning; Howard Benson

Thriving Ivory chronology
| Thriving Ivory (2003) | Through Yourself & Back Again (2010) |

Alternative cover
- 2003 album cover

Professional ratings
Review scores
| Source | Rating |
|---|---|
| AllMusic | 4/5 stars |

Thriving Ivory is the self-titled debut album of American rock band Thriving Ivory. The album was originally released on May 18, 2003, on the Wolfgang label. The album was re-released on June 21, 2008, on Wind-up Records, replacing the song "Flowers for a Ghost" with "Alien". The sound of their self-titled release was inspired by bands such as U2 and Coldplay. The album peaked at number 1 on the Billboard Heatseekers chart.

== Song information ==
Keyboard player Scott Jason told Songfacts the track "Alien", "is the most personal song [to me] on the record. That song is about my brother. And my brother, he's a brilliant, brilliant, brilliant kid, a full scholarship to Berkeley, and he's gone through some pretty heavy stuff. So that song is really personal."

== Track listing ==
=== Wind-up Records, 2008 ===
All tracks are written by Scott Jason (with Clayton Stroope).

| No. | Title | Length |
|---|---|---|
| 1. | "Runaway" | 3:40 |
| 2. | "Angels on the Moon" | 4:13 |
| 3. | "Alien" | 3:59 |
| 4. | "Hey Lady" | 3:48 |
| 5. | "Twilight" | 3:22 |
| 6. | "Secret Life" | 4:31 |
| 7. | "Long Hallway with a Broken Light" | 4:51 |
| 8. | "Overrated" | 3:50 |
| 9. | "For Heaven's Sake" | 3:43 |
| 10. | "Unhappy" | 3:47 |
| 11. | "Light Up Mississippi" | 3:29 |
| 12. | "Day of Rain" | 4:41 |

=== Wolfgang Records, 2003 ===
| No. | Title | Length |
|---|---|---|
| 1. | "Runaway" | 3:37 |
| 2. | "Angels on the Moon" | 4:21 |
| 3. | "Unhappy" | 3:48 |
| 4. | "For Heaven's Sake" | 3:44 |
| 5. | "Hey Lady" | 4:18 |
| 6. | "Light Up Mississippi" | 3:25 |
| 7. | "Overrated" | 3:58 |
| 8. | "Twilight" | 3:22 |
| 9. | "Secret Life" | 4:31 |
| 10. | "Flowers for a Ghost" | 4:11 |
| 11. | "Long Hallway with a Broken Light" | 4:43 |
| 12. | "Day of Rain" | 4:39 |
