= Bodypop =

Studio album by And One
- Released: September 4, 2006 (Germany); November 7, 2006 (US)
- Genre: Synth-pop
- Label: Out of Line
- Producer: Steve Naghavi

And One chronology
Aggressor (2003)	Bodypop (2006)	Bodypop 1 1/2 (2009)

Singles from Bodypop
- 1. "Military Fashion Show" Released: May 19, 2006; 2. "So Klingt Liebe" Released: July 14, 2006; 3. "Traumfrau" Released: December 1, 2006

Bodypop is the ninth studio album by German synthpop group And One, released in September 2006 by Out of Line records. It was produced by singer Steve Naghavi.

Additional track releases came with the Frontfeuer EP, which featured an extra five studio tracks. This EP was released on its own on December 5, 2006.

"Military Fashion Show", "So Klingt Liebe" and "Traumfrau" were released as singles. "Military Fashion Show" peaked at #1 on the DAC Singles charts while "So Klingt Liebe" peaked at #3.

== Reception ==
Professional ratings
Review scores
Source	Rating
AllMusic	3.5/5 stars

Stewart Mason of AllMusic wrote, "And One have traditionally had a bit of a hard industrial edge to their completely electronic sound, but... Bodypop sounds like pure 1982 synth pop." Mason drew comparisons to Depeche Mode, Soft Cell and Yazoo, while highlighting "Traumfrau" as "the one song that sounds more like the comparatively more experimental Orchestral Manoeuvres in the Dark or Thomas Dolby".

== Track listing ==
=== Bodypop ===
1. "Mein Anfang" - 2:18
2. "Military Fashion Show" - 4:28
3. "Enjoy the Unknown" - 5:21
4. "So Klingt Liebe" - 3:46
5. "The Sound of Believer" - 4:22
6. "Body Company" - 5:23
7. "Traumfrau" - 6:24
8. "Stand the Pain" - 4:24
9. "Sexkeit" - 4:03
10. "Love You to the End" - 5:09
11. "The Dream" - 6:32
12. "Dein Ende" - 6:26

=== Frontfeuer ===
1. "Rearming Strafbomber" - 4:50
2. "Master Master " - 3:41
3. "A Kind of Deutsch" - 3:51
4. "Steine Sind Steine" - 4:01
5. "The Force" - 3:12

== Other tracks ==
"Beauty Clown" - B-side to "Military Fashion Show"
"Computer Star" - B-side to "Military Fashion Show"
"Hardware Conflict" - B-side to "So Klingt Liebe" (S)
"Tell Me Lies" - B-side to "So Klingt Liebe" (E)
"Schmerzengel" - B-side to "So Klingt Liebe" (X)
"Naghavigationssystem" - B-side to "Traumfrau"
"Tonight" - B-side to "Traumfrau"
