= Herzwerk =

1995 studio album by Megaherz

Studio album by Megaherz
- Released: 1995
- Genre: Neue Deutsche Härte, alternative metal, alternative rock
- Length: 41:36
- Label: Megaherz

Megaherz chronology
Herzwerk (1995)	Wer bist du? (1997)

Herzwerk ("heart-work") is the debut album by German rock band Megaherz. It was released in 1995, as a self-released album. Several of the tracks were later remastered and re-released on Wer bist du?

== Track listing ==
No.	Title	Length
1.	"The Pride of Creation – To a Child"	4:34
2.	"Time"	4:08
3.	"Negative"	3:38
4.	"Possessed by the Devil"	4:20
5.	"Come Here"	3:53
6.	"Little Hans 1995"	4:05
7.	"We're Dying Young"	5:14
8.	"Sexodus" (bonus track)	4:46
9.	"Jump into the Ravine" (bonus track)	4:37
10.	"The Pride of Creation – The End" (bonus track)	2:21
Total length:		41:36
