= Kristy Jackson =

American singer-songwriter

- Born: August 31, 1955 (age 69); Charleston, West Virginia, U.S.
- Origin: Greensboro, North Carolina, U.S.
- Genres: Folk rock, Indie pop, country, blues
- Occupation(s): Singer-songwriter, musician, music publisher
- Instrument(s): Vocals, piano, guitar
- Years active: 1999–present
- Labels: Fever Pitch Music
- Website: kristyjackson.com

Kristy Jackson is an American singer/songwriter, record label owner, and a member of the BMI millionaire's club.

== Biography ==
In 1992, she wrote Take It Back, which was recorded by Grammy winning country music artist Reba McEntire. It was the first single from her album, It's Your Call, and reached #5 on the Billboard Hot Country Singles & Tracks chart in February 1993.

Jackson has released five albums since 2000. Her music is also used in film and TV, notably by Disney, Endemol Productions and Universal Pictures.

In 2001, she released the song "Little Did She Know (She Kissed A Hero)", which became the #1 most requested song among New York radio stations and elsewhere after 9/11. It also raised over $30,000 for 9/11 charities. In 2001, Jackson founded Fever Pitch Music, based in Greensboro, NC.

In 2008, "Little Did She Know" was rereleased by Grammy winning artist Patti Page.{Best Country Songs CD, Curb Records}

In 2012, Kristy created Triad Musicians Matter, a 501c3 non-profit corporation created to provide Triad North Carolina musicians and their families financial support when facing hardship.

== Discography ==
- "Blue Shades" (2000)
- "Little Did She Know (She'd Kissed A Hero)" (2001)
- "Body & Soul" (2002)
- "Best Seat in the House" (2006)
- "Skinny White Girls EP" (2010)

== Other work ==
Year	Album	Artist	Credit
1992	It's Your Call	Reba McEntire	Composer
1991	Sign of the Times	Gail Swanson	Co-Producer
2001	Little Did She Know (She'd Kissed a Hero)	Kristy Jackson	Composer, Primary Artist
2001	Endless Possibilities	Georgia Middleman	Composer
2001	Greatest Hits Volume III – I'm A Survivor	Reba McEntire	Composer
2008	50 Greatest HIts	Reba McEntire	Composer
2008	Best Country Songs	Patti Page	Composer
