= Dusty Drake (album) =

Studio album by Dusty Drake
- Released: June 3, 2003
- Genre: Country
- Label: Warner Bros. Nashville
- Producer: Billy Crain; Paul Worley; Clarke Schleicher

Dusty Drake is the debut studio album by American country music artist Dusty Drake. It is also his only studio album, having been released in 2003 via Warner Records Nashville. "And Then", "One Last Time", and "Smaller Pieces" were all released as singles.

== Content ==
The album contains three singles: "And Then", "One Last Time", and "Smaller Pieces". All three made the Billboard Hot Country Songs charts between 2002 and 2003, with "One Last Time" reaching number 26 in early 2003. "One Last Time" is a memorial to the passengers on the planes of 9/11.

== Critical reception ==
Professional ratings
Review scores
Source	Rating
Allmusic	4/5 stars
Country Standard Time	mixed
Billboard	favorable

Ray Waddell reviewed the album favorably in Billboard, praising Drake's songwriting and the variety of tempos in the music. He also compared Drake's voice favorably to that of John Anderson. Writing for AllMusic, Stephen Thomas Erlewine also described Drake as having "songwriting smarts", noting influences of both traditional country music and arena rock. He concluded his review by saying that "A taste for sentiment and silliness may keep this from being continually engaging, but at its best, Dusty Drake is tuneful, rocking, memorable modern country, beating Toby Keith at his own game", rating the album four out of five stars. Country Standard Time writer Stuart Munro was mixed, praising the lyrics of "Smaller Pieces" and "The Wish" while criticizing the same of "Too Wet to Plow" and "Ain't Nobody's Business". He described Drake's singing as "emotive" on "One Last Time", but added that the production "opts for a bombastic Southern rock or arena country sound...And Drake seems prone to mistake passion for singing at full throttle".

== Track listing ==
No.	Title	Writer(s)	Length
1.	"Too Wet to Plow"	Ron Harbin, Dusty Drake, Jerry Vandiver	3:26
2.	"Not Bad for a Good Ole Boy"	Wayne Womack, Drake, Kerry Kurt Phillips	3:42
3.	"Smaller Pieces"	Harbin, Drake, Phillips	3:24
4.	"One Last Time"	Phillips, Patrick Jason Matthews	3:47
5.	"Going on Eighteen"	Michael P. Heeney, Casey Beathard	4:31
6.	"The Hard Way"	Al Anderson, Bob DiPiero, Jeffrey Steele	4:31
7.	"Just Can't Take a Train"	Trey Bruce	5:14
8.	"The Wish"	Frank Highland, Aaron Sain, Drake	4:08
9.	"And Then"	Bob Feldman, Robert Vega, Ray Vega	3:40
10.	"Ain't Nobody's Business"	Billy Crain, Drake	3:55
11.	"Radio"	Greg Johnson, Drake	3:08

== Personnel ==
- J. T. Corenflos – electric guitar
- Billy Crain – electric guitar, acoustic guitar, percussion
- Melodie Crittenden – background vocals
- Ray "Chip" Davis – background vocals
- Dusty Drake – lead vocals, background vocals
- Dan Dugmore – steel guitar
- Stuart Duncan – fiddle
- Buddy Emmons – steel guitar
- Owen Hale – drums
- Camille Harrison – background vocals
- Aubrey Haynie – fiddle
- Gregory Hicks – background vocals
- Wes Hightower – background vocals
- Jim Hoke – penny whistle
- Troy Johnson – background vocals
- John Mock – penny whistle
- Greg Morrow – drums
- Gordon Mote – keyboards
- Steve Nathan – piano, Hammond B-3 organ, synthesizer, Wurlitzer
- Alison Prestwood – bass guitar
- Michael Rhodes – bass guitar
- Tom Roady – percussion
- Scotty Sanders – steel guitar
- Russell Terrell – background vocals
- Biff Watson – acoustic guitar
- Glenn Worf – bass guitar
- Paul Worley – acoustic guitar
- Jonathan Yudkin – fiddle, violin, viola, cello

== Chart performance ==
Chart (2003)	Peak position
U.S. Billboard Top Country Albums	30
U.S. Billboard Top Heatseekers	22
