= Kopfschuss =

1998 studio album by Megaherz

Studio album by Megaherz
- Released: 12 July 1998
- Genre: Neue Deutsche Härte, industrial metal
- Length: 55:30
- Label: ZYX
- Producer: Andi List, Yogi Lang

Megaherz chronology
Wer bist du? (1997)	Kopfschuss (1998)	Himmelfahrt (2000)

Singles from Kopfschuss
- 1. "Rock Me, Amadeus" Released: 30 March 1998; 2. "Liebestöter" Released: 21 September 1998; 3. "Freiflug" Released: 29 March 1999

Kopfschuss (German for "Headshot") is the second full-length studio album by German industrial metal band Megaherz. It was released in July 1998 via ZYX Music.

The album features a cover of a Falco song, "Rock Me Amadeus", and continued Megaherz's tradition of having one song per album based on a fairy tale with the track "Rappunzel", which alludes to the story of the same name. The track "Freiflug" re-uses lyrics from the song "Spring in die Schlucht" from the Herzwerk album. The opening track, "Liebestöter", brought the album most of its popularity abroad.

The album was re-released in the US in 2005 as II (read as "Two" or "Zwei"), with the handgun removed from the album art. The resulting effect appears as if the clown is reaching for a fist bump.

== Track listing ==
1. "Liebestöter" ("Love-killer") – 4:51
2. "Kopfschuss" ("Headshot") – 4:19
3. "Herz aus Stein" ("Heart of Stone") – 4:04
4. "Miststück" ("Bitch") – 3:30
5. "Burn" – 1:37
6. "Rappunzel" ("Rappunzel") – 3:58
7. "Blender" ("Fraud") – 4:19
8. "Jordan" – 3:39
9. "Freiflug" ("Free-flight") – 4:58
10. "Meine Sünde" ("My Sin") – 3:39
11. "Teufel" ("Devil") – 5:00
12. "Schizophren" ("Schizophrenic") – 3:34
13. "Rock Me, Amadeus" – 3:26
14. "Liebestöter (Rock-Club Mix)" – 4:26

"Liebestöter" ("Love-killer"), a pun on the German word for unattractive underwear.

"Bitch" is a slightly inaccurate translation in that "Miststück" is a non-gender-specific insult, though the context of the song makes it clear that the "Miststück" is a female. "Miststück" literally means "piece of crap".

"Jordan" is named for the expression "to cross the Jordan" (Jordan River), meaning "to die".

== Personnel ==
- Alexander Wesselsky – vocals
- X-Tian – guitar
- Wenz – bass
- Frank Gegerle – drums, percussion
- Noel Pix – guitar, keyboards and programming
- Andi List – additional programming on "Burn"
- Yogi Lang – additional programming on "Burn"
