= Angels on the Moon =

Single by Thriving Ivory

from the album Thriving Ivory
- Released: March 4, 2008
- Recorded: 2002
- Genre: Alternative rock
- Length: 4:21 (2003 release); 4:13 (2008 release)
- Label: Wolfgang/Wind-Up
- Songwriter(s): Scott Jason; Clayton Stroope
- Producer(s): Howard Benson; Chris Manning

Thriving Ivory singles chronology
"Angels on the Moon" (2008)	"Our December" (2008)

Audio sample
- file; help

"Angels on the Moon" is a song written by Scott Jason and Clayton Stroope and recorded by their band, Thriving Ivory. It was released in March 2008 as the lead single from the re-release of the group's self-titled album, released on Wind-Up Records. The song was used on the debut of VH1's Scream Queens. It was originally recorded in 2002 for their self-titled album.

== Content ==
The song was inspired by the September 11 attacks and there are many references to the city of New York in the song. Songwriter and keyboardist Scott Jason told Songfacts that "Angels on the Moon" was also inspired by the U2 song "Where The Streets Have No Name".

== Music video ==
The video begins with the band performing at various part of San Francisco while getting faded and some scenes performing together in an alley and it ends with lead singer Clayton Stroope walking and singing. The video was released on June 2, 2008 and was directed by Christopher Sims.

== Charts and sales ==
=== Peak positions ===
Chart (2008–09)	Peak position
Canada (Canadian Hot 100)	46
U.S. Billboard Hot 100	75
U.S. Billboard Adult Pop Songs	20
U.S. Billboard Pop Songs	28

=== Certifications ===
Country	Certification	Date	Sales certified
United States	Gold	December 19, 2009	500,000
