= One Last Time (Dusty Drake song) =

Single by Dusty Drake

from the album Dusty Drake
- B-side: "Too Wet to Plow"
- Released: March 22, 2003
- Genre: Country
- Length: 3:47
- Label: Warner Bros. Nashville
- Songwriter(s): Kerry Kurt Phillips, Patrick Jason Matthews
- Producer(s): Billy Crain, Paul Worley, Charlie Schleicher

Dusty Drake singles chronology
"And Then" (2002)	"One Last Time" (2003)	"Smaller Pieces" (2003)

"One Last Time" is a song recorded by American country music artist Dusty Drake. It was released in March 2003 as the second single from the album Dusty Drake. The song reached number 26 on the Billboard Hot Country Singles & Tracks chart. The song was written by Kerry Kurt Phillips and Patrick Jason Matthews.

== Content ==
The song is a memorial to the passengers who died in the 9/11 plane crashes. Lyrically, it is framed as a cell phone conversation between a man who is a passenger on one of the planes and his wife.

== Critical reception ==
In a review of Drake's album, Billboard writer Ray Waddell called the song "a powerhouse weeper with a heartrending twist".

== Chart performance ==
"One Last Time" debuted at number 53 on the Billboard Hot Country Songs chart dated for the week ending March 22, 2003.

Chart (2003)	Peak position
US Hot Country Songs (Billboard)	26
