= Dusty Drake =

American musician

- Born: Dean Buffalini; February 23, 1964 (age 62)
- Origin: Monaca, Pennsylvania, United States
- Genres: Country
- Occupation: Singer-songwriter
- Instrument: Vocals
- Years active: 2002–present
- Labels: Warner Nashville; Big Machine

Dean Buffalini (born February 23, 1964), known professionally as Dusty Drake, is an American country music artist. Drake played various venues in his native Pennsylvania for several years before moving to Nashville, Tennessee, co-writing a 1996 single for Joe Diffie. By 2003, Drake was signed to Warner Bros. Records as a recording artist. That year, he released three singles from his self-titled debut album, including "One Last Time", his first Top 40 entry on the Hot Country Songs chart. Drake released a fourth single for the label before exiting in 2004.

In 2007, he signed to the independent Big Machine Records label, charting with the single "Say Yes", co-written by Brett James, Don Schlitz and Josh Turner. An album for Big Machine was originally slated to be released in 2007 but was never issued, and after showing the same level of commitment his former label showed, Drake exited the label's roster in 2008. Overall, Drake has charted six times on the Billboard country charts. Two of his singles have reached Top 40: "One Last Time" (inspired by the September 11 attacks) at No. 26, and "Say Yes" at No. 36.

== Biography ==
Dean Buffalini was born in Monaca, Pennsylvania, United States, on February 23, 1964 as the middle child of seven children. He gained an early interest in music from his father and grandfather, both of whom enjoyed listening to country and bluegrass music.

While in high school, he sang lead and played drums in local bands. After graduating high school, Buffalini studied to be an air traffic controller. He held that position for four years at a regional airport. At the same time, he pursued his career in country music, eventually fronting a band called Silverado in addition to performing solo. Signed as an opening act for Garth Brooks at a venue in Salem, Ohio, Buffalini was mistakenly identified as "Dusty" by a concert promoter, and as a result, he began to use Dusty as his stage name.

== Musical career ==
He moved to Nashville, Tennessee in 1993 in search of a record deal. Shortly afterward, he changed his stage name to Dusty Drake, because he was told by a manager that "there were Deans coming out the wazoo" (such as Billy Dean, Dean Miller, Stacy Dean Campbell, and Dean Dillon). Drake then found work as a demo singer and songwriter. His first cut as a songwriter was "C-O-U-N-T-R-Y", a single for Joe Diffie in 1996 from the album Life's So Funny. Other artists who recorded Drake's songs included Janie Fricke, Ricochet (the single "Can't Stop Thinkin' About That"), The Oak Ridge Boys and Mark Chesnutt.

In 2002, Drake was signed to Warner Bros. Records as a recording artist. His first single, "And Then", peaked at No. 57 on the Billboard country music charts. Following this song was "One Last Time". Inspired by the crash of United Airlines Flight 93, the song became his first Top 40 country hit, peaking at 26. Both songs were included on his debut album (also titled Dusty Drake), which was released in mid-2003.

After the release of his album, Drake went on to become an opening act for Kenny Chesney and Brooks & Dunn, as well as performing on the Grand Ole Opry. His album's third single, "Smaller Pieces", reached a peak of 50. By 2004, a fourth single entitled "I Am the Working Man" was released, which went on to peak at 43. This song was not included on an album, and Drake was dropped from Warner Bros.' roster after its release.

Drake signed to Big Machine Records in 2007. His first single for the label, "Say Yes" (co-written by MCA Nashville artist Josh Turner along with Brett James and Don Schlitz), became his second Top 40 country hit, peaking at 36. Drake's first album for Big Machine, tentatively titled Dusty Drake at a Honky-Tonk Near You, was originally slated for release in June 2007. The album was not released. Drake exited the label shortly after. In January 2009, Drake released another single independently called "The 12th Man", which charted at 58. The song, a tribute to the Pittsburgh Steelers, used the melody of Mark Chesnutt's 2004 hit "The Lord Loves the Drinkin' Man".

== Discography ==
=== Studio albums ===
Title	Album details	Peak chart positions	
Title	Album details	US Country	US Heat
Dusty Drake	Release date: June 3, 2003; Label: Warner Bros. Nashville	30	22

=== Singles ===
Year	Single	Peak positions	Album
Year	Single	US Country	Album
2002	"And Then"	57	Dusty Drake
2003	"One Last Time"	26	Dusty Drake
2003	"Smaller Pieces"	50	Dusty Drake
2004	"I Am the Working Man"	43	single only
2007	"Say Yes"	36	Dusty Drake at a Honky-Tonk Near You (unreleased)
2009	"The 12th Man"	58	single only
