= Aggressor (And One album) =

Studio album by And One
- Released: August 25, 2003
- Genre: Synthpop
- Length: 44:51
- Label: Virgin
- Producer: Steve Naghavi

And One chronology
Virgin Superstar (2000)	Aggressor (2003)	Bodypop (2006)

Singles from Aggressor
- 1. "Krieger" Released: August 11, 2003

Aggressor is the eighth studio album from German synthpop group And One, released in 2003 by Virgin.

It was the band's first album to feature no songs sung in English, instead consisting completely of German-language tracks. Its style is close to that of their next album, Bodypop, but retains their previous sound at the same time.

"Krieger" was released as the first and only single from the album.

== Reception ==
The Allmusic review by Rick Anderson awarded the album 3 stars stating "First of all, And One deserve kudos for singing in their native German rather than embarrassing themselves, as so many of their European colleagues do, with lyrics in pidgin English. (It sort of undermines the darkness and intensity of your delivery if your unsteady grammar makes you sound like a syntactically confused fourth grader.) Second of all, And One also deserve kudos for keeping alive the sound of vintage Belgian EBM while subtly deepening and updating it with such novel touches as real melodies and occasional flourishes of rhythmic syncopation. Songs like "Kein Anfang" (No Beginning) and "Krieger" (Warrior) feature both soaring melodies and downright lovely backing vocals along with the requisite jackboot rhythms and ominously burbling synthesizer, and if "Sternradio" (the name of a popular Berlin dance club) suffers from the sudden incursion of an inexplicable chipmunk voice, well, that's what passes for whimsy in the industrial community. Recommended. ".

Professional ratings
Review scores
Source	Rating
Allmusic	3/5 stars

== Track listing ==
All songs written by Steve Naghavi.

No.	Title	Length
1.	"Kein Anfang"	2:00
2.	"Schwarz"	4:47
3.	"Krieger"	5:45
4.	"Sternradio"	4:36
5.	"Speicherbar"	3:46
6.	"Fehlschlag"	5:33
7.	"Für Immer"	4:09
8.	"Einstieg"	2:04
9.	"Strafbomber"	4:21
10.	"Fernsehapparat" (vocals by Chris Ruiz)	3:08
11.	"Tote Tulpen"	3:10
12.	"Kein Ende"	1:31
Total length:		45:03

== Production ==
- Bernd Steinwedel – mastered
- Steve Naghavi – producer, arranger, mixing, vocals, electronics
