= 5 (Megaherz album) =

2004 studio album by Megaherz

Studio album by Megaherz
- Released: 2004
- Genres: Neue Deutsche Härte, industrial metal
- Length: 57:56
- Label: S.A.D.
- Producer: Ralph Quick

Megaherz chronology
Herzwerk II (2002)	5 (2004)	Heuchler (2008)

Singles from 5
- 1. "Dein Herz schlägt" Released: 2005

Professional ratings
Review scores
Source	Rating
Allmusic	

5 is the fifth studio album by German industrial metal band Megaherz. It was released in 2004 and re-released in the United States in 2006. It's the first and the only album by this band to feature Mathias "Jablonski" Elsholz as the lead vocalist.

== Track listing ==
No.	Title	English translation	Length
1.	"Dein Herz schlägt"	Your Heart Beats	4:12
2.	"Göttlich"	Divine	3:48
3.	"Ja, genau"	Yeah, Right; Literally Yes, Exactly	4:41
4.	"Gott sein '04"	To Be God '04	5:02
5.	"Wann wirst du gehn?"	When Will You Leave?	4:53
6.	"Mach dich frei"	Free Yourself	3:12
7.	"Eigentlich"	Actually	3:06
8.	"Zeig mir dein Gesicht"	Show Me Your Face	4:22
9.	"Ebbe & Flut"	Ebb & Flow	4:28
10.	"Komm rüber (Schattenland)"	Come Over (Shadowland)	3:58
11.	"Weiter"	Further	3:44
12.	"Es tut weh"	It Hurts	4:19
13.	"Augenblick"	Moment; Literally Eyeblink, or Blink of an Eye	5:17
