= Tanzomat =

Studio album by And One
- Released: March 4, 2011 (Germany)
- Recorded: 2010
- Genre: Synthpop
- Label: Out of Line
- Producer: Steve Naghavi

And One chronology
Bodypop 1 1/2 (2009)	Tanzomat (2011)

Singles from Tanzomat
- 1. "Zerstörer" Released: January 21, 2011

Professional ratings
Review scores
Source	Rating
COMA Music Magazine	(Favorable)

Tanzomat is the tenth studio album by German synthpop group And One, released in 2011. The album was released along with a live CD featuring recordings from their ongoing tour.

A single, "Zerstörer", was released prior to the album, but only the two B-sides, "Sex Drive" and "No Song for You" appeared on the album. Some new tracks were played on their current tour, but never made it to the record.

Tanzomat is the band's final release with Out of Line Records. It is also the final album featuring founding member Chris Ruiz as well as Gio van Oli.

== Reception ==
Reception for the album has been mostly positive. Steelberry Clones said "Long-time fans of the band will appreciate the fact that the satire-tinged and versatile mix is very much going back to the roots of the early works of And One."

== Track listing ==
All songs written by Steve Naghavi.

No.	Title	Length
1.	"Save the Hate"	3:45
2.	"Shining Star"	3:39
3.	"Only Your Dreams"	3:21
4.	"Dancing In the Factory"	3:14
5.	"Angel Eyes"	3:42
6.	"Seven"	3:22
7.	"The Aim Is In Your Head"	3:51
8.	"Electrocution"	4:11
9.	"Sex Drive"	3:38
10.	"Playing Dead"	6:29
11.	"No Song for You"	4:07
12.	"And I Love"	3:25

Bonus Live 2010 Disc (released only on Deluxe Edition)
No.	Title	Length
1.	"Ego"	2:24
2.	"Second Front"	3:12
3.	"Love and Fingers"	3:12
4.	"Men In Uniform"	6:13
5.	"Sexkeit"	3:28
6.	"My Warrior"	3:14
7.	"Tanz Der Arroganz"	4:10
8.	"Klaus"	1:59
9.	"Anguish"	2:51
10.	"Over There"	4:07

== Zerstörer ==
"Zerstörer" is the first single released to promote the album. Despite being released for this reason, the title track did not appear on the album; the two b-sides, however, were.

A music video was shot for "Sex Drive", one of the b-sides.

EP Version/Digital Single
No.	Title	Length
1.	"Zerstörer"	3:08
2.	"Sex Drive"	3:50
3.	"No Song for You"	3:53
4.	"Mirror In Your Heart" (Live 2010)	5:07
5.	"The Secret" (Live 2010)	2:24
6.	"Military Fashion Show" (Live 2010)	5:28
7.	"Military Fashion Show" (Original Version)	2:46
8.	"Zerstörer" (Peine I.S.T. Die Ansage 2011 Mix)	3:26

7" vinyl single
No.	Title	Length
1.	"Zerstörer"	3:08
2.	"Sex Drive"	3:50
