= Herzwerk II =

Studio album by Megaherz
- Released: 2002
- Genres: Nu metal, Alternative metal, industrial metal
- Length: 63:57
- Label: Firestarter
- Producers: Christian "X-ti" Bystron, Ralf Weigand

Megaherz chronology
Querschnitt (2001)	Herzwerk II (2002)	5 (2004)

Professional ratings
Review scores
Source	Rating
Rock Hard	8.5/10
metal.de	8/10

Herzwerk II ("Heart-work II") is the fourth studio album by German industrial metal band Megaherz. It is the last album to feature singer Alexx Wesselsky before he left the band together with Noel Pix to form Eisbrecher.

Unlike their previous releases that had funk and rapcore elements, this album has a more polished and modern production, and more of an alternative metal and nu metal sounds. The final track, "Es brennt" ("It Burns"), which talks about the differences between Eastern and Western Germany, was included on the digipak version of the disc. The album was re-released in the United States in 2008, with "Es brennt" included.

== Track listing ==
1. "Herzblut" ("Heart-blood") - 5:18
2. "Glas und Tränen" ("Glass and Tears") – 3:55
3. "I.M. Rumpelstilzchen" (Unofficial collaborator Rumplestiltskin) – 4:31
4. "5. März" ("March 5th") – 4:17
5. "F.F.F. (Flesh for Fantasy)" – 5:25 (Billy Idol cover)
6. "Hand auf's Herz" ("Hand on My Heart") – 3:59
7. "Zu den Sternen" ("To the Stars") – 5:14
8. "Licht II (Instrumental)" ("Light II") – 2:08
9. "Heute schon gelebt?" ("Lived Yet Today?") – 3:51
10. "An deinem Grab" ("At Your Grave") – 6:57
11. "Perfekte Droge" ("Perfect Drug") – 4:27
12. "Spiel' nicht…" ("Don't Play…") – 4:41
13. "Gold" – 5:11
14. "Es brennt" ("It Burns") – 4:03

"Herzblut" is a German compound word literally meaning "heart-blood" or "blood of the heart". The official translation suggests that "a better translation would be 'your everything and all, your essence'."

== Personnel ==
- Alexander Wesselsky – lead vocals
- Christian "X-ti" Bystron – guitar
- Wenz – bass
- Oliver Pohl – guitar
- Jürgen Schlachter – drums
- Ralf Weigand – keyboards, percussion
- Corni Bartels – drums on "Hand auf's Herz"
- Nicki Schuster, Claudia Rossler, Voodoo Man – backing vocals

== Charts ==
Chart (2002)	Peak position
German Albums (Offizielle Top 100)	78
