= Hänschen klein =

German nursery song

"Hänschen klein" (Little Hans) by Franz Wiedemann (1821–1882) is a German folk song that originated in the Biedermeier period (1815–1848) and later became a nursery song in the early 20th century.

== Background ==
The lyrics of "Hänschen klein" tell in three stanzas of Hans, a boy who ventures from home into the world, leaving his bereft mother, and returns many years later to his family. In 1900, an abridged version in two stanzas by Otto Frömmel (1873–1940) became a nursery song for children to sing in kindergarten. Today, a single-verse form is widely used.

The melody of "Hänschen klein" is used in "Lightly Row", a Mother Goose rhyme. The melody is used in the war movie Cross of Iron (1977). In the German-language version of 2001: A Space Odyssey (1968), the computer HAL 9000 sings "Hänschen klein", while an astronaut shuts it down.

== Text and lyrics ==
Wiedemann
Hänschen klein, geht allein
in die weite Welt hinein,
Stock und Hut steht ihm gut,
ist auch wohlgemuth.
Aber Mutter weinet sehr,
Hat ja nun kein Hänschen mehr.
Wünsch dir Glück, sagt ihr Blick,
komm nur bald zurück!

Viele Jahr, trüb und klar,
Hänschen in der Fremde war.
Da besinnt sich das Kind,
ziehet heim geschwind.
Doch, nun ist's kein Hänschen mehr,
nein, ein großer Hans ist er;
schwarz verbrannt Stirn und Hand
wird er wohl erkannt?

Eins, zwei, drei geh'n vorbei,
wissen nicht, wer das wohl sei.
Schwester spricht: Welch Gesicht?
Kennt den Bruder nicht.
Kommt daher die Mutter sein,
schaut ihm kaum ins Aug hinein,
ruft sie schon: Hans! Mein Sohn!
Grüß dich Gott, mein Sohn!

Literal translation
Little Hans went alone
into the wide world.
Stick and hat suits him well,
he is very cheerful.
But mother cries a lot
Hasn't got a little Hans any more.
"Wish you luck!" says her glance,
"Come back soon!"

Many years, cloudy and clear,
Hänschen was abroad.
Then, the child thinking about it
hurries home quickly.
But now he's no longer a little boy.
No, big Hans is he;
tanned black on forehead and hand,
Will he be recognized?

One two three pass him by,
they don't know who this is.
Sister speaks: "What face?"
Doesn't know the brother.
Along comes his mother,
hardly looks him in the eye,
and calls already: "Hans, my son!
God greet you, my son!"

Poetic translation
Little Hans went alone
in the wider world to roam,
staff and hat, suits him that!
He is really pleased.
But his mother cries so sore
for she has no Hänschen more
"Wish you luck!" says her look
"Just you come back soon!"

Many year cloud and clear
Hänschen wandered far and near.
Then he thinks, "No more jinks,
speed you home right now!"
But he is young Hans no more,
no, it's big Hans to the fore;
nicely tanned brow and hand,
will they know him now?

One two three pass and see,
they don't know who that may be.
Sister says: "Whose that face?"
Knows her brother not.
But here comes his mother nigh,
hardly looks him in the eye;
then a cry, "Hans, oh my!
God's greetings, my son!"

=== Today's version ===
Hänschen klein ging allein
in die weite Welt hinein.
Stock und Hut stehn ihm gut,
ist gar wohlgemut.
Aber Mutter weinet sehr,
hat ja nun kein Hänschen mehr.
Da besinnt sich das Kind,
läuft nach Haus geschwind.

Little Hans went alone
out into the wide world.
Staff and hat suit him well,
he is in good spirits.
But his mother weeps so much,
for she no longer has little Hans.
Look! the child changes his mind
and returns home quickly.
