= Falco discography =

- Studio albums: 10
- Live albums: 5
- Compilation albums: 14
- Singles: 38
- Video albums: 2
- Music videos: 23

Austrian singer Falco released ten studio albums, five live albums, 14 compilation albums, 38 singles, 2 video albums and 23 music videos.

In 1981, he released his first single, "That Scene", which did not enter the charts. His second single and the first of his first studio album, "Der Kommissar", peaked at number one on the German and Austrian single charts. Falco's first studio album, Einzelhaft, debuted at number one of the Austrian album charts and 19 of the German album charts. His second studio album, Junge Roemer, peaked at number one of the Austrian album charts.

== Albums ==
=== Studio albums ===
List of studio albums, with chart positions, sales figures and certifications
Title	Details	Peak chart positions										Certifications
Title	Details	AUT	GER	SWI	NOR	NLD	SWE	NZ	CAN	UK	US	Certifications
Einzelhaft	Released: 1982; Label: A&M, Sony Music, GiG; Formats: LP, cassette	1	17	—	7	—	45	45	31	—	64	IFPI AUT: 2x Platinum
Junge Roemer	Released: 1 June 1984; Label: A&M, Sony Music, GiG; Formats: LP, cassette	1	76	—	—	—	—	—	—	—	—	
Falco 3	Released: 15 October 1985; Label: A&M, Teldec, GiG; Formats: LP, cassette	1	2	1	3	16	—	2	9	32	3	BVMI: Platinum; IFPI AUT: Platinum; IFPI SWI: Gold; MC: Platinum; RIAA: Gold
Emotional	Released: 1 November 1986; Label: Warner Bros., Sire; Formats: LP, cassette	1	1	5	7	—	—	—	—	—	—	BVMI: Gold; IFPI AUT: Gold
Wiener Blut	Released: 15 September 1988; Label: GiG, Warner Bros., Sire; Formats: LP, cassette, CD	2	9	12	—	—	—	—	—	—	—	
Data de Groove	Released: 1990; Label: GiG, Warner Bros., Sire; Formats: LP, cassette, CD	5	15	53	—	—	—	—	—	—	—	
Nachtflug	Released: 4 October 1992; Label: GiG, A&M; Formats: LP, cassette, CD	1	73	—	—	—	—	—	—	—	—	IFPI AUT: Gold
Out of the Dark (Into the Light)	Released: 27 February 1998; Label: GiG, Electrola; Formats: LP, cassette, CD	1	3	4	—	—	—	—	—	—	—	IFPI AUT: 2× Platinum; BVMI: Platinum; IFPI SWI: Platinum
Verdammt wir leben noch	Released: 1999; Label: EMI; Formats: LP, cassette, CD	3	35	—	—	—	—	—	—	—	—	
Symphonic	Released: 2 February 2008; Label: Sony BMG; Formats: CD, LP	1	15	34	—	—	—	—	—	—	—	IFPI AUT: Platinum
The Spirit Never Dies	Released: 4 December 2009; Label: EMI; Formats: CD	1	3	33	—	—	—	—	—	—	—	BVMI: Gold; IFPI AUT: Platinum
"—" denotes a recording that did not chart or was not released in that territory.

=== Live albums ===
List of live albums, with chart positions, sales figures and certifications
Title	Details	Peak chart positions		
Title	Details	AUT	GER	SWI
Live Forever (recorded on 27 October 1986 in Berlin)	Released: 29 November 1999; Label: East West; Formats: LP, cassette, DVD	-	-	—
L.I.V.E. Donauinsel (recorded in Vienna 1993)	Released: 14 April 2004; Label: Sony BMG; Formats: CD, DVD	14	92	—
Symphonic (recorded in Wiener Neustadt 1994)	Released: 2 February 2008; Label: Sony BMG; Formats: CD, DVD	1	15	34
Falco Coming Home – The Tribute Donauinselfest 2017	Released: 2 February 2018; Label: Sony BMG; Formats: CD, DVD	1	—	13
Symphonic Live (reissue)	Released: 22 September 2022; Label: Sony BMG; Formats: digital download	—	—	—
Live Forever: The Complete Show – Berlin 1986 (re-release from the 1999 album Live Forever)	Released: 9 June 2023; Label: Warner Music Germany; Formats: CD, digital download	19	70	—
"—" denotes a recording that did not chart or was not released in that territory.

=== Compilation albums ===
Title	Details	Peak chart positions				Certifications
Title	Details	AUT	GER	NOR	SWI	Certifications
Greatest Hits	Released: December 1996; Label: East West; Formats: LP, cassette, CD	2	—	—	—	IFPI AUT: Gold
Greatest Hits Vol. II	Released: March 1997; Label: East West; Formats: LP, cassette, CD	8	—	—	—	
Best Of	Released: February 1998; Label: East West; Formats: LP, cassette, CD	7	—	—	—	
The Remix Hit Collection	Released: 1998; Label: East West; Formats: LP, cassette, CD	—	51	—	—	
The Hit-Singles	Released: May 1998; Label: East West; Formats: LP, cassette, CD	7	—	—	—	BVMI: Gold
The Final Curtain – The Ultimate Best Of	Released: February 1999; Label: Sony BMG; Formats: LP, cassette, CD	1	2	—	6	IFPI AUT: Gold; BVMI: Gold; IFPI SWI: Gold
Hoch wie nie	Released: 2 January 2007; Label: Sony BMG; Formats: CD	1	2	—	5	IFPI AUT: 3× Platinum; BVMI: Platinum; IFPI SWI: Gold
The Ultimate Collection	Released: 2008; Label: Sony BMG; Formats: CD	—	—	18	—	
So80s presents Falco	Released: 7 December 2012; Label: Soundcolours; Formats: CD	48	—	—	—	
Original Album Classics	Released: 28 August 2015; Label: Sony; Formats: CD	33	—	—	—	
Falco	Released: 7 October 2016; Label: Soundcolours; Formats: CD	48	—	—	—	
Falco 60	Released: 17 February 2017; Label: Sony; Formats: CD	1	3	—	3	IFPI AUT: 2× Platinum; BVMI: Gold
The Sound of Musik	Released: 4 February 2022; Label: Sony; Formats: LP, cassette, CD	1	4	—	44	
Falco	Released: 11 February 2022; Label: Sony; Formats: LP	3	13	—	—	
"—" denotes a recording that did not chart or was not released in that territory.

=== Tribute albums ===
Title	Details	Peak chart positions		
Title	Details	AUT	GER	SWI
Sterben um zu Leben	Released: 25 May 2018; Label: Sony; Formats: CD	12	18	51

=== Soundtracks ===
Title	Details	Certifications
Helden von Heute	Released: 1984; Label: Formats: CD	BVMI: Platinum

== Singles ==
=== As lead artist ===
List of singles as lead artist, with chart positions and certifications, showing year released and album name
Title	Year	Peak chart positions										Certifications	Album
Title	Year	AUT	GER	SWI	NLD	SWE	IRE	NZ	CAN	UK	US	Certifications	Album
"Ganz Wien"	1981	72 (Note: "Ganz Wien" debuted at no. 72 in 2017.)	—	—	—	—	—	—	—	—	—		Einzelhaft
"Der Kommissar"	1981	1	1	2	17	4	24	4	11	—	— (Note: "Der Komissar" peaked at no. 74 on the US Cashbox singles chart and at no. 10 on the US Billboard Hot Dance Club Play chart.)	BVMI: Gold; IFPI AUT: Gold; RMNZ: Gold; SNEP: Gold; (US: 100,000)	Einzelhaft
"Maschine brennt"	1982	4	10	—	—	—	—	—	—	—	— (Note: The double A-side single "On the Run / Maschine Brennt" peaked at no. 9 on the US Billboard Hot Dance Club Play chart.)		Einzelhaft
"Auf der Flucht"	1982	—	—	—	—	—	—	—	—	—	—		Einzelhaft
"Zuviel Hitze"	1982	—	—	—	—	—	—	—	—	—	—		Einzelhaft
"Junge Roemer"	1984	8	—	24	—	—	—	—	—	—	— (Note: "Junge Roemer" peaked at no. 52 on the US Billboard Hot Dance Club Play chart.)		Junge Roemer
"Nur mit dir"	1984	—	—	—	—	—	—	—	—	—	—		Junge Roemer
"Kann es Liebe sein?" (with Désirée Nosbusch)	1984	—	—	—	—	—	—	—	—	—	—		Junge Roemer
"Rock Me Amadeus"	1985	1	1	2	46; 2 (Note: "Rock Me Amadeus (Canadian / American '86 Mix)" reached no. 2 in the Netherlands and in Flanders (Flemish-Dutch speaking Belgium) in 1986.)	1	1	1	1	1	1	BVMI: Platinum; BPI: Gold; IFPI AUT: Gold; MC: Platinum; RMNZ: Gold	Falco 3
"Vienna Calling"	1985	4	3	7	—	11	6	10	13	10	18		Falco 3
"Jeanny"	1985	1	1	1	1	7	—	—	—	68	—	BVMI: Gold; IFPI AUT: Gold; NVPI: Gold	Falco 3
"The Sound of Musik"	1986	4	4	11	—	—	—	29	—	61	— (Note: The Remix of "The Sound of Musik" peaked at no. 19 on the US Billboard Hot Dance Club Play chart.)		Emotional
"Coming Home (Jeanny Part 2)"	1986	4	1	3	—	11	—	—	—	—	—		Emotional
"Emotional"	1987	—	50	—	—	—	—	—	—	85	—		Emotional
"Body Next to Body" (with Brigitte Nielsen)	1987	6	22	—	—	—	—	—	—	—	—		Non-album single
"Wiener Blut"	1988	4	9	24	—	—	—	—	—	—	—		Wiener Blut
"Satellite to Satellite"	1988	—	—	—	—	—	—	—	—	—	—		Wiener Blut
"Garbo"	1988	—	—	—	—	—	—	—	—	—	—		Wiener Blut
"Do It Again"	1988	—	—	—	—	—	—	—	—	—	—		Wiener Blut
"Data de Groove"	1990	12	—	—	—	—	—	—	—	—	—		Data de Groove
"Charisma Kommando"	1990	—	—	—	—	—	—	—	—	—	—		Data de Groove
"Nachtflug"	1992	—	—	—	—	—	—	—	—	—	—		Nachtflug
"Titanic"	1992	3	47	—	—	—	—	—	—	—	—		Nachtflug
"Dance Mephisto"	1992	17	—	—	—	—	—	—	—	—	—		Nachtflug
"Mutter, der Mann mit dem Koks ist da"	1996	3	11	30	—	—	—	—	—	—	—	IFPI AUT: Gold	Out of the Dark (Into the Light)
"Naked"	1996	4	50	—	—	—	—	—	—	—	—		Out of the Dark (Into the Light)
"Out of the Dark"	1998	2	2	3	—	—	—	—	—	—	—	IFPI AUT: Gold; BVMI: 3× Gold	Out of the Dark (Into the Light)
"Der Kommissar" (Jason Nevins and Club 69 Remixes)	1998	39	—	—	—	—	—	—	—	—	—		Non-album single
"Egoist"	1998	6	4	19	—	—	—	—	—	—	—	BVMI: Gold	Out of the Dark (Into the Light)
"Push! Push!"	1999	9	50	—	—	—	—	—	—	—	—		The Final Curtain – The Ultimate Best Of
"Verdammt wir leben noch"	1999	26	—	—	—	—	—	—	—	—	—		Verdammt wir leben noch
"Europa"	1999	—	—	—	—	—	—	—	—	—	—		Verdammt wir leben noch
"Männer des Westens" (T. Börger Version 2007)	2007	14	55	—	—	—	—	—	—	—	—		Non-album singles
"Falcos 1." ("Chance to Dance" / "Summer")	2007	—	—	—	—	—	—	—	—	—	—		Non-album singles
"Der Kommissar 2008"	2008	49	—	—	—	—	—	—	—	—	—		Symphonic
"Die Königin von Eschnapur"	2008	—	—	—	—	—	—	—	—	—	—		Symphonic
"The Spirit Never Dies (Jeanny Final)"	2009	3	—	—	—	—	—	—	—	—	—		The Spirit Never Dies
"Kissing in the Kremlin"	2010	—	—	—	—	—	—	—	—	—	—		The Spirit Never Dies
"Jeanny" (with Ali As)	2018	—	—	—	—	—	—	—	—	—	—		Sterben um zu Leben
"Rock Me Amadeus" (with Sun Diego)	2018	63	71	—	—	—	—	—	—	—	—		Sterben um zu Leben
"Vienna Calling" (with Celo & Abdi feat. Niqo Nuevo)	2018	—	—	—	—	—	—	—	—	—	—		Sterben um zu Leben
"—" denotes a recording that did not chart or was not released in that territory.

=== As featured artist ===
List of singles as featured artist, with chart positions, showing year released and album name
Title	Year	Peak chart positions	Album
Title	Year	AUT	Album
"Zwischen Zeit und Raum" (Nazar feat. Falco)	2014	14	Camouflage

== Videography ==
=== Video albums ===
- 1984: Helden von Heute
- 2008: Symphonic

=== Music videos ===
Year	Title	Album
1981	"Ganz Wien"	Einzelhaft
1981	"Der Kommisasr" (2 versions)	Einzelhaft
1982	"Maschine brennt"	Einzelhaft
1982	"Auf der Flucht"	Einzelhaft
1983	"Zuviel Hitze"	Einzelhaft
1985	"Rock Me Amadeus"	Falco 3
1985	"Vienna Calling" (2 versions)	Falco 3
1985	"Jeanny"	Falco 3
1986	"The Sound of Muzik"	Emotional
1986	"Coming Home (Jeanny Part II, One Year Later)"	Emotional
1987	"Emotional"	Emotional
1987	"Body Next to Body" (with Brigitte Nielsen)	non-album
1988	"Wiener Blut"	Wiener Blut
1990	"Charisma Kommando"	Data de Groove
1992	"Titanic"	Nachtflug
1996	"Mutter, der Mann mit dem Koks ist da"	Out of the Dark (Into the Light)
1996	"Naked" (with T»MB)	Out of the Dark (Into the Light)
1998	"Out of the Dark"	Out of the Dark (Into the Light)
1998	"Egoist"	Out of the Dark (Into the Light)
1999	"Push! Push!"	The Final Curtain – The Ultimate Best Of
1999	"Verdammt wir leben noch"	Verdammt wir leben noch
