= Hoch wie nie =

2007 greatest hits album by Falco

Greatest hits album by Falco
- Released: 2 January 2007 (Austria); 8 January 2007 (non-German-speaking European countries); 2 August 2007 (non-European countries)
- Recorded: 1981–2006
- Genre: Pop-rock; pop rap
- Label: Sony BMG

Falco chronology
Verdammt wir leben noch (1999)	Hoch wie nie (2007)	Einzelhaft (25th Anniversary Edition) (2007)

Professional ratings
Review scores
Source	Rating
AllMusic	4/5 stars

Hoch wie nie (loosely translated, Higher Than Ever Before) is a posthumously-published greatest hits album by Austrian musician Falco, who died in 1998. The Longplayer was published on Falco's 50th birthday. It was released in two versions. The limited edition additionally contains the song "Urban Tropical" (original flipside of the "Rock Me Amadeus" single from 1985), which was only available on vinyl before. There is also a DVD with the same name, which is a documentary about Falco's life and career. In the non-European countries the album was released on 2 August 2007.

== Track listing ==
=== CD 1 ===
1. "Der Kommissar"
2. "Vienna Calling" (Wait for the Extended Mix)
3. "Jeanny"
4. "Emotional" (album version)
5. "The Sound of Musik" (album version)
6. "Junge Roemer" (album version)
7. "Wiener Blut"
8. "Hoch wie nie"
9. "Munich Girls"
10. "Nachtflug"
11. "No Answer (Hallo Deutschland)"
12. "Nur mit dir"
13. "Helden von Heute"
14. "Kann es Liebe sein" (album version)
15. "Ihre Tochter"
16. "Auf der Flucht"
17. "Ganz Wien"

=== CD 2 ===
1. "Rock Me Amadeus" (European Gold mix)
2. "Maschine brennt" (album version)
3. "America"
4. "Out of the Dark"
5. "Egoist" (album version)
6. "Brillantin' Brutal'"
7. "Data de Groove" (album version)
8. "Verdammt wir leben noch" (album version)
9. "Naked" (original version)
10. "Mutter, der Mann mit dem Koks ist da"
11. "Titanic"
12. "Europa" (album version)
13. "Coming Home (Jeanny Part 2, Ein Jahr danach)"
14. "It's All Over Now, Baby Blue" (Rough Mix)
15. "Tribute to Falco – by the Bolland Project" (Radio Mix)
16. "Männer des Westens" (T. Börger Version 2007)

Deluxe edition

17. "Urban Tropical" (single version)

== "Männer des Westens" ==
A new version of the song "Männer des Westens" appears on this album, with a rap-like rhythm in the background. It was released as a single on 16 February 2007. On the occasion of the single's release, German TV channels Sat. 1 and ProSieben started an advertising campaign for 70.000€.

== Charts ==
=== Weekly charts ===
Chart (2007)	Peak position
Austrian Albums (Ö3 Austria)	1
German Albums (Offizielle Top 100)	2
Swiss Albums (Schweizer Hitparade)	5

=== Year-end charts ===
Chart (2007)	Position
Austrian Albums (Ö3 Austria)	1
German Albums (Offizielle Top 100)	35
Swiss Albums (Schweizer Hitparade)	65
