= Symphonic (Falco album) =

Studio album by Falco
- Released: 1 February 2008
- Recorded: 1994
- Genre: Classic rock; Pop-rock
- Label: Sony
- Producer: Thomas Rabitsch

Falco chronology
Einzelhaft (25th Anniversary Edition) (2007)	Symphonic (2008)	The Ultimate Collection (2008)

Symphonic is a live DVD by Falco containing a largely recreated live performance with a symphonic orchestra, that was originally performed in Wiener Neustadt in 1994. A separate audio CD with studio versions of these tracks, also called Symphonic, was also released at the same time: 1 February 2008, a few days before the tenth anniversary of the singer's death.

== Recording ==
The concert was held in the Wiener Neustadt Cathedral square (Domplatz) on 12 May 1994 for a crowd of more than 10,000 people. Falco and his band were accompanied by a The 72-piece orchestra of the local Josef Matthias Hauer Conservatory, arranged by Peter Paul Skrepek and Thomas Rabitsch and conducted by Raoul Herget. The concert, on the occasion of the Wiener Neustadt's 800th anniversary, would be Falco's only such performance, and it was well received locally at the time.

Both audio and video of the concert were recorded for archival purposes, the audio on a 16-bit, 2-track DAT tape from the soundboard and a video mixed from footage of three cameras, but the quality was poor. Falco's keyboardist and sometime producer Rabitsch bemoaned, "Right after the concert, I was annoyed that we didn't record it properly".

== Production ==
Following Falco's death in 1998, Rabitsch continued to entertain the idea of releasing the performance and in 2006 began work on the project. The quality of the audio source material was inadequate, however, so Rabitsch opted instead to recreate the concert. In 2007, both Falco's band and the orchestra were re-recorded in the studio, reproducing the 1994 show; only Falco's vocals, albeit highly processed, remain from the original show. For the sound of audience, Rabitsch had members of a Falco fan club sing and clap along with the songs in the studio.

Because only three cameras were originally used to cover the concert, amateur video captured by several fans, was inserted into the existing recordings to make the video appear more dynamic and exciting. Extensive editing was undertaken to overcome the poor quality of the video and members of the orchestra were even filmed in front of a green screen during the new recording to render close-ups the classical instruments.

== Release ==
Both the audio and video work were financed by Rabitsch. Sony Music bought the rights to the project and in 2008, two products were released: a DVD with the Rabitsch-reconstructed "live" video in 2.0 stereo and 5.1 surround mixes and sound and an audio CD with the newly recorded audio mixed with Falco's vocals from the original studio recordings of his songs.

On the DVD, the song order is rearranged from the original concert and some cuts were made between the songs. Also missing is the final encore, a second rendition of "Ganz Wien".

Regarding the audio DC, Rabitsch explains that "We combined Falco's studio voice with the new orchestral recording. It's almost like a new studio album." The audio CD was not intended as a copy of the DVD audio, but a standalone focus on the symphonic sound without the live ambience. For most of the songs, Falco's studio voice from master tapes was mixed with new orchestral recordings. However, the three songs ("Der Kommissar, "Die König von Eschnapur" and "Europa") that were not played at the 1994 concert featured a completely new orchestral sound.

These studio songs were supplemented by four bonus tracks with the audio from the DVD; use of the live reconstructions of these tracks ("Helden von Heute" and its reprise, "Junge Roemer" and "Ganz Wien") was necessitated because the studio master tapes of these songs with Falco's voice could not be found. However, besides these, the entire new "live" audio was not released in an audio format at that time.

== Reception ==
In Austria, the album debuted at number one and the albums chart, and in Germany made it to number 15.

Critical reception of both the audio and video was largely negative. With this convoluted path to release and its questionable provenance, The Gap calls it "a show that never took place". While the technical accomplishments were praised, critics panned the final product as "bland" (Musikexpress). Guido Tartarotti of the Kurier calls it "Falco for people who don't care about Falco" and compares it with the work of André Rieu. Samir H. Köck for Die Presse asks, "Would [Falco] have ever released an orchestral 'Live in Wiener Neustadt' record? Probably never... Respect for the refined restoration work, but the artistic gain remains modest."

== 2022 re-releases ==
On 23 September 2022, the Symphonic audio album was re-released on two LPs, while the audio of the Symphonic concert was released on streaming services and in high-resolution audio as Symphonic Live.

== Track listings ==
=== Audio CD ===
1. The Sound Of Musik (Symphonic)
2. Vienna Calling (Symphonic)
3. Jeanny & Coming Home-Medley (Symphonic)
4. Titanic (Symphonic)
5. Rock Me Amadeus (Symphonic)
6. Les nouveaux riches (Symphonic)
7. Nachtflug (Symphonic)
8. Dance Mephisto (Symphonic)
9. Monarchy Now (Symphonic)
10. Der Kommissar (Symphonic)
11. Die Königin von Eschnapur (Symphonic)
12. Europa (Symphonic)
13. Helden von Heute (Symphonic (Live))
14. Junge Römer (Symphonic (Live))
15. Ganz Wien (Symphonic (Live))
16. Helden von heute - Reprise (Symphonic (Live))

=== DVD video (Region 2) ===
1. Symphonic Intro
2. The Sound of Musik
3. Monarchy Now
4. Dance Mephisto
5. Les Nouveaux Riches
6. Junge Römer
7. Ganz Wien
8. Jeanny & Coming Home
9. Titanic
10. Vienna Calling
11. Nachtflug
12. Rock Me Amadeus
13. Helden von Heute

=== 2022 digital download (Symphonic Live) ===
1. Symphonic Intro (Falco Symphonic | Live) — 2:45
2. The Sound of Musik (Falco Symphonic | Live) — 4:43
3. Monarchy Now (Falco Symphonic | Live) — 4:22
4. Dance Mephisto (Falco Symphonic | Live) — 3:36
5. Les Nouveaux Riches (Falco Symphonic | Live) — 3:25
6. Junge Roemer (Falco Symphonic | Live) — 4:35
7. Ganz Wien (Falco Symphonic | Live) — 5:19
8. Jeanny / Coming Home (Falco Symphonic | Live) — 6:26
9. Titanic (Falco Symphonic | Live) — 4:25
10. Vienna Calling (Falco Symphonic | Live) — 5:13
11. Nachtflug (Falco Symphonic | Live) — 3:51
12. Rock Me Amadeus (Falco Symphonic | Live) — 4:51
13. Helden von Heute (Falco Symphonic | Live) — 7:48

== Charts ==
Chart performance for Symphonic
Chart (2008)	Peak position
Austrian Albums (Ö3 Austria)	1
German Albums (Offizielle Top 100)	15
Swiss Albums (Schweizer Hitparade)	34

== Certifications ==
Certifications for Symphonic
Region	Certification	Certified units/sales
Austria (IFPI Austria)	Platinum	20,000^{*}
^{*} Sales figures based on certification alone.
