= Junge Roemer =

1984 album by Falco

Studio album by Falco
- Released: June 1, 1984
- Recorded: 1984
- Genre: New wave; pop; synth-pop
- Length: 37:51
- Label: A&M; GiG/Sony
- Producer: Robert Ponger

Falco chronology
Einzelhaft (1982)	Junge Roemer (1984)	Falco 3 (1985)

Singles from Junge Roemer
- 1. "Junge Roemer" Released: May 15, 1984; 2. "Nur mit dir" Released: October 31, 1984; 3. "Kann es Liebe sein?" Released: December 17, 1984 (with Désirée Nosbusch as Falco & Désirée)

Junge Roemer (Young Romans) is the second album by Austrian pop rock artist Falco, released in 1984.

== Production and success ==
The album was a No. 1 hit in his native Austria. The title track was a hit single there as well as in Switzerland, and most notably in Spain, where it peaked at No. 2. Still, the project was considered a relative disappointment compared with the international number one success of the breakthrough hit single, "Der Kommissar", from his previous album, Einzelhaft. This inspired him to change producers and incorporate more English phrases for titles and choruses, which resulted in a trio of worldwide hits two years later with "Rock Me Amadeus", "Vienna Calling" and "Jeanny".

While the phrase is written "Junge Römer" in standard German, the title of Falco's album and single in both German and English pressings is "Junge Roemer", to make the product more easily understandable worldwide.

== Trivia ==
All titles on the album were filmed for an approximately one-hour film contribution Falco – Heroes of Today by DoRo commissioned by ORF. After Falco's death a book was published that was named after the song found on the album, Hoch als nie.

In addition, a best-of CD/DVD was released in 2007 with the same name (see Hoch wie nie).

Professional ratings
Review scores
Source	Rating
AllMusic	3/5 stars

== Track listing ==
1. "Junge Roemer" (Young Romans) – 4:33
2. "Tut-Ench-Amon (Tutankhamen)" – 4:33
3. "Brillantin' Brutal'" (Brutal Brilliantine) – 3:50
4. "Ihre Tochter" (Your Daughter) – 4:31
5. "No Answer (Hallo Deutschland)" – 3:39
6. "Nur mit dir" (Only with You) – 4:29
7. "Hoch wie nie" (Higher Than Ever) – 4:23
8. "Steuermann" (Helmsman) – 3:47
9. "Kann es Liebe sein" (Can It Be Love) – 4:06

== Charts ==
1984 chart performance for Junge Roemer
Chart (1984)	Peak position
Austrian Albums (Ö3 Austria)	1

2023 chart performance for Junge Roemer
Chart (2023)	Peak position
German Albums (Offizielle Top 100)	76
