= Wiener Blut =

Wiener Blut may refer to:

- Wiener Blut (waltz), a waltz by Johann Strauss II
- Wiener Blut (operetta), an operetta by Johann Strauss II
- Wiener Blut (album), an album by Falco
  - "Wiener Blut" (song), the title song from the album
- Vienna Blood, a 1942 film by Willi Forst
- A 1997 album and song by the Austrian metal band Stahlhammer
- Wiener Blut, a song from Liebe Ist Für Alle Da, album by the German band Rammstein
