= Emotional (Falco album) =

1986 album by Falco

Studio album by Falco
- Released: 1 November 1986
- Recorded: 1986
- Genre: Pop
- Length: 48:02
- Label: GiG
- Producer: Bolland & Bolland

Falco chronology
| Falco 3 (1985) | Emotional (1986) | Wiener Blut (1988) |

Singles from Emotional
- 1. "The Sound of Musik" Released: 1 August 1986; 2. "Coming Home (Jeanny Part II, One Year Later)" Released: 1 November 1986; 3. "Emotional" Released: 11 May 1987

Professional ratings
Review scores
| Source | Rating |
|---|---|
| AllMusic | 3/5 stars |

Emotional is the fourth studio album by Austrian singer and rapper Falco, released in 1986.

It was Falco's second album produced by Bolland & Bolland. The lead single was "The Sound of Musik". The second single, "Coming Home (Jeanny Part II, One Year Later)", is a sequel to the song "Jeanny".

The album's cover, a still from the music video for the title track, is a homage to a similar backdrop used by Elvis Presley in his 1968 comeback special.

== Track listing ==
1. "Emotional" – 4:52
2. "Kamikaze Cappa" – 5:10
3. "Crime Time" – 4:24
4. "Cowboyz and Indianz" – 5:46
5. "Coming Home (Jeanny Part II, One Year Later)" – 5:32
6. "The Star of Moon and Sun" – 5:19
7. "Les Nouveaux Riches" – 4:31
8. "The Sound of Musik" – 4:56
9. "The Kiss of Kathleen Turner" – 7:32

=== 2022 remaster bonus tracks ===
10. "The Sound of Musik" (Extended Rock 'N' Soul Version) – 10:00
11. "The Sound of Musik" (12" Edit) – 7:12
12. "Coming Home (Jeanny Part 2, Ein Jahr danach)" (Extended Version) – 7:43
13. "Emotional" (Extended Version) – 7:38
14. "Emotional" (Extended N.Y. Mix) – 8:21
15. "Emotional" (Extended N.Y. Mix) (English Version) – 8:21
16. "Emotional" (Her Side of the Story) – 5:19

==== Bonus disc ====
1. "The Sound of Musik" (Rock 'N' Soul Edit) – 4:35
2. "The Sound of Musik" (Single Edit) – 4:12
3. "The Sound of Musik" (7" Edit) – 4:07
4. "The Sound of Musik" (Full Length Instru-Mental Version) – 4:05
5. "The Sound of Musik" (Instru-Mental Version) – 2:44
6. "Coming Home (Jeanny Part 2, Ein Jahr danach)" (Special Edited Radio Version) – 4:24
7. "Emotional" (N.Y. Mix) – 4:20
8. "Emotional" (N.Y. Mix) (English Version) – 4:20
9. "Emotional" (English Version) – 4:54
10. "Emotional" (Her Side of the Story 7" Edit) – 4:09
11. "Crime Time" (7" Edit) – 3:28

==== DVD: Live in Frankfurt 1986 ====
1. "The Star of Moon and Sun"
2. "Junge Roemer"
3. "Männer des Westens – Any Kind of Land"
4. "The Kiss of Kathleen Turner"
5. "Jeanny"
6. "Crime Time"
7. "Munich Girls"
8. "Emotional"
9. "Coming Home (Jeanny Part 2, Ein Jahr danach)"
10. "Vienna Calling"
11. "Rock Me Amadeus"

== Charts ==
=== Weekly charts ===
Weekly chart performance for Emotional
| Chart (1986–1987) | Peak position |
|---|---|
| Austrian Albums (Ö3 Austria) | 1 |
| European Albums (Music & Media) | 28 |
| Finnish Albums (Suomen virallinen lista) | 32 |
| German Albums (Offizielle Top 100) | 1 |
| Japan LPs (Oricon) | 69 |
| Norwegian Albums (VG-lista) | 7 |
| Swiss Albums (Schweizer Hitparade) | 5 |

=== Year-end charts ===
Year-end chart performance for Emotional
| Chart (1986) | Position |
|---|---|
| Austrian Albums (Ö3 Austria) | 26 |

== Certifications ==
Certifications for Emotional
| Region | Certification | Certified units/sales |
|---|---|---|
| Austria (IFPI Austria) | Gold | 25,000^{*} |
^{*} Sales figures based on certification alone.
