= Goddess (band) =

Eurodance music band

- Elvira Valentine, vocalist

Background information
- Origin: Netherlands
- Genres: Eurodance
- Years active: 1991-1994
- Labels: BMG, Columbia, Epic
- Members: inactive
- Past members: Elvira Valentine, Rob Bolland, Ferdi Bolland

Goddess was a Dutch Eurodance act by producer's Rob and Ferdi Bolland, fronted by singer Elvira Valentine. They are best known for their 1992 hit single "Sexual".

== History ==
Valentine (born in Amsterdam on January 28, 1962) started her career as a backing vocalist for artists such as Falco and Joe Cocker; she was also part of the duos Say When! (with Ingrid "B.B. Queen" Simons) and Club Risqué (with Daryl White). Goddess released The Sexual Album in 1992, and while it did not chart, the single "Sexual" peaked at #74 on the Billboard Hot 100, staying on the chart for ten weeks. They released a few more singles afterwards, without the same success.

Valentine died from cancer in 2002. The Bolland brothers, who had produced a number of electronic music records since the early 1970s, have been inactive since the end of the 1990s.

== Discography ==
=== Albums ===
- The Sexual Album (1992)

=== Singles ===
1992

- Sexual
- In My Bed
- Je T'Aime

1993

- Get Loud (Racism Beat It)

1994

- Spirits in the Night
- Tapdancer (I Wanna See You Mooove)
