= Wiener Blut (song) =

Single by Falco

from the album Wiener Blut
- Released: 1988
- Label: GiG; Teldec
- Songwriters: Falco; Rob Bolland; Ferdi Bolland
- Producers: Rob Bolland; Ferdi Bolland

Falco singles chronology
"Body Next to Body" (1987)	"Wiener Blut" (1988)	"Satellite to Satellite" (1988)

"Wiener Blut" is a song by Austrian singer and musician Falco, released as a single from his 1988 studio album Wiener Blut. It reached no. 4 in Austria, no. 9 in West Germany and no. 24 in Switzerland. The song is credited to Falco, Rob Bolland and Ferdi Bolland. It was produced by Rob and Ferdi Bolland.

== Critical reception ==
Pan-European magazine Music & Media wrote, "Possibly the best since Rock Me Amadeus: big beats, hectic instrumentation and an irresistible chorus. Cool."

== Track listings ==
- 7" single GIG 111 207 (1988, Austria)
- 7" single Teldec 247 743-7 (1988, West Germany)
1. "Wiener Blut" (3:31)
2. "Tricks" (3:52)
- 3" CD single Teldec 247 741-2 (West Germany, 1988)
1. "Wiener Blut" (7:20)
2. "Tricks" (3:52)
3. "Sand am Himalaya" (4:00)
- 12" maxi single Teldec 247 742-0 (West Germany, 1988)
1. "Wiener Blut" (7:20)
2. "Tricks" (3:52)

== Charts ==
Chart (1988)	Peak position
Austria (Ö3 Austria Top 40)	4
Italy Airplay (Music & Media)	5
Switzerland (Schweizer Hitparade)	24
West Germany (Official German Charts)	9
