= Falco 3 =

1985 album by Falco

Studio album by Falco
- Released: 15 October 1985
- Studios: Bullet Sound (Nederhorst den Berg, Netherlands) (Note: Tracks 1–7 and 9); Basic (Munich, West Germany) (Note: Track 8); Union (Munich, West Germany) (Note: Track 10)
- Genres: Pop rock; new wave; German rap
- Length: 51:04
- Label: GiG
- Producer: Bolland & Bolland

Falco chronology
Junge Roemer (1984)	Falco 3 (1985)	Emotional (1986)

Singles from Falco 3
- 1. "Rock Me Amadeus" Released: May 1985; 2. "Vienna Calling" Released: 30 September 1985; 3. "Jeanny" Released: 23 December 1985

Professional ratings
Review scores
Source	Rating
AllMusic	4.5/5 stars

Falco 3 is the third studio album by Austrian singer and rapper Falco, released on 15 October 1985 by GiG Records in Austria, by Teldec in Germany and by A&M Records elsewhere. In the United States, it peaked at number three on the Billboard 200 and at number 18 on the Top R&B/Hip-Hop Albums chart. Following two albums produced and co-written by Robert Ponger, this is Falco's first album to be produced by Bolland & Bolland.

== Background ==
Following an Academy Award-winning film about Mozart, the Americanised mix of "Rock Me Amadeus" capitalised on and continued a resurgence of interest in the Viennese composer, and was an instant success in the US, spending three weeks at number one on the Billboard Hot 100 and peaking at number four on the dance chart and number six on the R&B singles chart. The album was released in the US, the UK, Australia and Japan (and a few other countries) with a different track listing: the singles "Rock Me Amadeus" and "Vienna Calling" are presented in extended mixes, the 'Salieri Version' (8:20) and the 'Metternich Arrival Mix' (7:38), whereas in the rest of the world, the album uses the normal European singles mixes. Yugoslavia received both versions of the album; Jugoton (the local licensee for GiG Records) released the European version of the album, while PGP RTB (the local A&M Records licensee) released the American format.

=== Other songs ===
"Vienna Calling" continued the geographic and stylistic theme, and followed its predecessor as far as the US top 20. A third single, a power ballad called "Jeanny" sung from the point of view of a stalker, proved a controversial hit in Europe; banned by some radio programmers there, it nevertheless improved on the chart peak of its predecessor, though it was virtually ignored in the US. The album also included a reworked German-language version of the Cars' song "Looking for Love", titled "Munich Girls", as well as a lounge lizard cover of Bob Dylan's "It's All Over Now, Baby Blue".

== Track listing ==
1. "Rock Me Amadeus" (The Gold Mix) (US, UK and Japan version substitutes "The Salieri Version", spelled wrongly as "Solieri Version") – 3:22/8:20
2. "America" (The City of Grinzing Version) – 3:56
3. "Tango the Night" (The Heart Mix) – 2:28
4. "Munich Girls (Lookin' for Love)" (Just Another Paid One) – 4:17
5. "Jeanny" (Sus-Mix-Spect Crime Version) – 5:50
6. "Vienna Calling" (Waiting for the Extended Mix) (US, UK and Japan version substitutes "The Metternich Arrival Mix") – 4:02/7:38
7. "Männer des Westens – Any Kind of Land" (Wilde Bube Version) – 4:00
8. "Nothing Sweeter Than Arabia" (The Relevant Madhouse Danceteria Jour-Fix-Mix) – 4:46
9. "Macho Macho" (Sensible Boy's Song) – 4:56
10. "It's All Over Now, Baby Blue" (No Mix) – 4:41

Despite all the songs boasting special mixes on the cover (e.g. "The Heart Mix"), these are all the normal album versions. The only re-mixes are to be found on the US, UK and Japanese version of this album, which contain the "Salieri Version" of "Rock Me Amadeus" and the "Metternich Arrival Mix" of "Vienna Calling" instead of the normal European versions. The European CD versions of this album have a wrongly mastered version of "It's All Over Now, Baby Blue", which contains a repeated loop and therefore runs just over 5 minutes – the anniversary edition of this album finally corrected this mistake.

Originally Falco wanted to include an 11th song (the self-written "Without You") on the album but due to contract reasons and the fact that the melody-based song did not fit in with the Bolland & Bolland-written songs, the song was omitted.

The 25th anniversary edition, released on 22 October 2010, adds the following bonus tracks to the original (and remastered) album tracks:

1. "Jeanny" (cover/remix version by the British band Hurts) – 3:38
2. "Without You" (demo version, unreleased song from the "Falco 3" sessions 1985) – 5:45
3. "Rock Me Amadeus" (Extended Version) – 7:07 (first time on CD)
4. "Vienna Calling" (Tourist Version) – 7:07 (first time on CD)
5. "Männer des Westens – Any Kind of Land" (Extended Version) – 5:23 (B-side of "Jeanny" 12-inch version; first time on CD)
6. "Urban Tropical" (Extended Version) – 7:26 (B-side of "Rock Me Amadeus" 12-inch version; first time on CD)

The two-CD deluxe version has additional video material:

1. "The Making of the Legendary Falco 3" (documentary by DoRo, which also includes the famous Salieri Version of "Rock Me Amadeus" in an edited form, running over 7 minutes)

The deluxe edition, released on 24 October 2025, includes new liner notes, all the lyrics, notes to the songs and adds the following bonus tracks to the original (and remastered) album tracks:

1. Rock Me Amadeus (Salieri Version)
2. Rock Me Amadeus (Extended Version)
3. Rock Me Amadeus (12″ American Edit)
4. Rock Me Amadeus (The American Edit)
5. Rock Me Amadeus(Canadian Version)
6. Rock Me Amadeus (Canadian/American ’86 Mix/Edit)
7. Rock Me Amadeus (Salieri Version Edit)
8. Rock Me Amadeus (Live 1985, Wien-Rathausplatz)
9. Rock Me Amadeus (so8os Reconstruction) (Newly created mix by German producers Blank & Jones that uses only original elements from the original mix)
10. Urban Tropical
11. Urban Tropical (Extended Version)
12. Vienna Calling (Metternich Arrival Mix)
13. Vienna Calling (Tourist Version)
14. Vienna Calling (The New ’86 Mix/Edit)
15. Vienna Calling (The 'Vienna Girls' Sax Mix Max)
16. Vienna Calling (Midnight Train To Vienna/Mean Wien Mix)
17. Jeanny (Extended Version)
18. Jeanny (12″ English Version)
19. Jeanny (Special Edited Radio Version)
20. Jeanny ('Girl Is Missing' English Version)
21. Jeanny (English Special Radio Edit)
22. Männer Des Westens – Any Kind Of Land (Extended Version)
23. Männer Des Westens – Any Kind Of Land (Single Edit)
24. It’s All Over Now, Baby Blue (Rough Mix)
25. Without You (Demo Version)
26. Without You (Live 1985, Wien-Rathausplatz)
27. Flyin' High (Live 1985, Graz-Liebenau)

== Charts ==
=== Weekly charts ===
1985–1986 weekly chart performance for Falco 3
Chart (1985–1986)	Peak position
Austrian Albums (Ö3 Austria)	1
Canada Top Albums/CDs (RPM)	9
Dutch Albums (Album Top 100)	16
European Albums (Eurotipsheet)	26
German Albums (Offizielle Top 100)	2
Japan LPs (Oricon)	22
New Zealand Albums (RMNZ)	2
Norwegian Albums (VG-lista)	3
Swiss Albums (Schweizer Hitparade)	1
UK Albums (Official Charts)	32
US Billboard 200	3
US Top R&B/Hip-Hop Albums (Billboard)	18

2025 weekly chart performance for Falco 3
Chart (2025)	Peak position
German Pop Albums (Offizielle Top 100)	4

Weekly chart performance for Falco 3 (25th Anniversary Edition)
Chart (2010)	Peak position
Austrian Albums (Ö3 Austria)	22

=== Year-end charts ===
Year-end chart performance for Falco 3
Chart (1986)	Position
Austrian Albums (Ö3 Austria)	3
Canada Top Albums/CDs (RPM)	33
Dutch Albums (Album Top 100)	71
European Albums (Music & Media)	45
German Albums (Offizielle Top 100)	16
New Zealand Albums (RMNZ)	38
Norwegian Summer Period Albums (VG-lista)	1
Swiss Albums (Schweizer Hitparade)	17
US Billboard 200	54

2025 year-end chart performance for Falco 3
Chart (2025)	Position
Austrian Albums (Ö3 Austria)	58

== Certifications ==
Certifications for Falco 3
Region	Certification	Certified units/sales
Austria (IFPI Austria)	Platinum	100,000
Canada (Music Canada)	Platinum	100,000^{^}
Germany (BVMI)	Platinum	500,000^{^}
Switzerland (IFPI Switzerland)	Gold	25,000^{^}
United States (RIAA)	Gold	500,000^{^}
^{^} Shipments figures based on certification alone.
