= Data de Groove (song) =

Single by Falco

from the album Data de Groove
- Released: 1990
- Label: GiG; Teldec
- Songwriters: Robert Ponger; Falco
- Producers: Robert Ponger; Falco

Falco singles chronology
"Do It Again" (1988)	"Data de Groove" (1990)	"Charisma Kommando" (1990)

"Data de Groove" is a song by Austrian musician Falco, released as the first single from his 1990 studio album Data de Groove.

== Background and writing ==
The song was written by Robert Ponger and Falco. They are also credited as the producers.

== Commercial performance ==
The song reached no. 12 in Austria.

== Track listings ==
7" single GIG 111 227 (1990, Austria)
7" single Teldec 9031-71518-7 (1990, Austria)

Side 1. "Data De Groove" (3:59)
Side 2. "Data De Groove" (Human Version) (3:59)

12" maxi single Teldec 715-19-0 (1990)

A. "Data De Groove" (Club Mix) (6:48)
B1. "Data De Groove" (Digital-Analogue Version) (3:59)
B2. "Data De Groove" (Instrumental Version) (4:57)

== Charts ==
Chart (1990)	Peak position
Austria (Ö3 Austria Top 40)	12
