= Body Next to Body =

Single by Falco
- Released: December 15, 1987
- Label: GiG, Teldec, WEA
- Songwriter(s): Giorgio Moroder, Falco, Tom Whitlock
- Producer(s): Giorgio Moroder

Falco singles chronology
"Emotional" (1987)	"Body Next to Body" (1987)	"Wiener Blut" (1988)

"Body Next to Body" is a song recorded by Falco with Brigitte Nielsen. It was released as a single (credited to "Falco meets Brigitte Nielsen") in 1987.

== Background and writing ==
The song was written by Giorgio Moroder, Falco, and Tom Whitlock. The recording was produced by Giorgio Moroder.

== Commercial performance ==
The song reached no. 6 in Austria and no. 22 in West Germany.

== Track listings ==
7" single GIG 111 201 (1987, Austria)
7" single Teldec 6.15000 (1987, Germany)

Side 1. "Body Next To Body" (4:18)
Side 2. "Body Next To Body (The Other Version)" (4:16)

12" maxi single GIG 666 201 (1987, Austria)
12" maxi single Teldec 6.20835 (1987, Germany)

A1. "Body Next To Body" (Dance Mix) (6:18)
B1. "Body Next To Body" (Rock Version) (6:30)
B2. "Body Next To Body" (The Other Version) (6:22)

== Charts ==
Chart (1987–1988)	Peak position
Austria (Ö3 Austria Top 40)	6
West Germany (Media Control Charts)	22
