= Verdammt wir leben noch =

1999 album by Falco

Studio album by Falco
- Released: February 1999
- Genre: Pop rock; pop-rap
- Length: 52:00
- Label: EMI
- Producer: Thomas Rabitsch

Falco chronology
Out of the Dark (Into the Light) (1998)	Verdammt wir leben noch (1999)	The Spirit Never Dies (2009)

Singles from Verdammt wir leben noch
- 1. "Verdammt wir leben noch" Released: 1999; 2. "Europa" Released: 2000

Verdammt wir leben noch (Damn we're still alive) is Falco's second posthumously published album, with Out of the Dark (Into the Light) being the first one. The album consists of unreleased Falco tracks, including "Krise", which, though it has never been finished, was an experimental song Falco made at the end of 1997, several months before his death.

== Track listing ==
1. "Verdammt wir leben noch" (Falco, Thomas Lang, Thomas Rabitsch) – 5:14
2. "Die Königin von Eschnapur" (Falco, Thomas Lang, Thomas Rabitsch) – 4:29
3. "Qué Pasa Hombre?" (Falco, Gunther Mende, Candy DeRouge) – 4:14
4. "Europa" (Falco, Thomas Lang, Thomas Rabitsch) – 5:07
5. "Fascinating Man" (Falco, Rob Bolland, Ferdi Bolland) – 4:00
6. "Poison" (Falco, Gunther Mende, Candy DeRouge) – 4:22
7. "Ecce Machina" (Thomas Lang) – 5:31
8. "We Live for the Night" (Falco, Rob Bolland, Ferdi Bolland) – 3:52
9. "Krise" (Falco, Thomas Lang, Thomas Rabitsch) – 3:54
10. "From the North to the South" (Falco, Rob Bolland, Ferdi Bolland) – 3:11
11. "Der Kommissar" (Club 69 remix) (Falco, Robert Ponger) – 3:41
12. "Verdammt wir leben noch" (remix) – 4:26
