= Auf der Flucht =

1982 single by Falco

"On the Run (Auf der Flucht)"

Single by Falco

from the album Einzelhaft
- Released: 1982
- Recorded: 1981
- Length: 4:13
- Label: A&M
- Songwriter(s): Falco
- Producer(s): Robert Ponger

Falco singles chronology
| "Maschine brennt" (1982) | "On the Run (Auf der Flucht)" (1982) | "Zuviel Hitze" (1982) |

"Auf der Flucht" (also known as "On the Run") is a 1982 song by Falco.

Under the title "On the Run (Auf der Flucht)" it was released as a double A-side promotional single in France, Canada and the US.

It was produced in 1981 in Berlin, Germany, by Robert Ponger. On the other side of the single, there is another song called "Maschine brennt", the double A-side single "On the Run / Maschine brennt" peaked at number nine in the US Hot Dance Club Play chart.

In European countries (except France), the single wasn't released as a double A-side, which meant the next single after "Der Kommissar" became "Maschine brennt" instead (that didn't include "Auf der Flucht") in case of Falco's home country Austria.

In Austria and Norway, the song peaked at number four in the official charts. In Germany, it reached number ten, in Spain number 34, and in the Netherlands number 49.

== Track listing ==
7" single A&M 9721 (1982)

1. "On the Run" – 3:40
2. "Maschine brennt" – 3:54

12" maxi single "On the Run" A&M SP-12063 (1982, US)

1. "On the Run (Auf der Flucht)" (Specially Remixed Version) – 4:33
2. "Maschine brennt" (Specially Remixed Version) – 4:55
