= Push! Push! (song) =

Single by Falco

from the album The Final Curtain – The Ultimate Best Of
- Released: 1999
- Label: EMI Electrola GmbH
- Songwriter(s): Falco; Voyce
- Producer(s): Jeo

Falco singles chronology
| "Egoist" (1998) | "Push! Push!" (1999) | "Verdammt wir leben noch" (1999) |

"Push! Push!" is a song by Falco. It was first released as the lead single from his posthumous 1999 greatest-hits album The Final Curtain – The Ultimate Best Of.

== Background and writing ==
The song is credited to Falco and Voyce. The recording was produced by Jeo.

== Commercial performance ==
The song reached number 9 in Austria and number 50 in Germany.

== Track listing ==
Promo 10" vinyl maxi single – EMI Electrola P 520 534 (Germany, 1998)

A. "Push! Push!" (Jeo extended mix) – 5:30
B. "Push! Push!" (Dee Jay Sören extended mix) – 5:00

Promo CD single – EMI Electrola CDP 520.527 (Germany, 1998)

1. "Push! Push!" (Jeo radio mix) – 3:45

CD maxi single – Electrola 865 812 6 (EMI) (18 January 1999)

1. "Push! Push!" (Jeo radio mix) – 3:45
2. "Push! Push!" (Dee Jay Sören radio mix) – 3:30
3. "Geld" (3:46)

== Charts ==
| Chart (1999) | Peak position |
|---|---|
| Austria (Ö3 Austria Top 40) | 9 |
| Germany (GfK) | 50 |
