= Maschine brennt =

1982 single by Falco

Single by Falco

from the album Einzelhaft
- Released: 1982
- Length: 3:32
- Label: GiG; A&M
- Songwriter(s): Robert Ponger; Falco
- Producer(s): Robert Ponger

Falco singles chronology
| "Der Kommissar" (1981) | "Maschine brennt" (1982) | "On the Run (Auf der Flucht)" (1982) |

"Maschine brennt" is a song by Falco from his 1982 debut studio album Einzelhaft. The song was also released as a single.

== Background and writing ==
The song was written by Robert Ponger and Falco. The recording was produced by Robert Ponger.

== Commercial performance ==
The song reached no. 4 in Austria and no. 10 in Germany.

== Track listings ==
7" single GIG 111 127 (1982, Austria, Switzerland)
7" single GIG 6.13555 AC (1982, Germany)
7" single A&M AMS 9236 (1982, Netherlands, Spain)
7" single GIG GIG-127 (1982, Finland)

1. "Maschine brennt" – 3:36
2. "Ganz Wien" – 5:08

12" maxi single "On the Run" A&M SP-12063 (1982, US)

1. "On the Run (Auf der Flucht)" (Specially Remixed Version) – 4:33
2. "Maschine brennt" (Specially Remixed Version) – 4:55

== Charts ==
| Chart (1982) | Peak position |
|---|---|
| Austria (Ö3 Austria Top 40) | 4 |
| Germany | 10 |
| Norway (VG-lista) | 4 |
