= Falko Weißpflog =

East German ski jumper

Personal information
- Nationality: East Germany
- Born: 1954 (age 71–72) Pleißa, East Germany

Sport
- Sport: Skiing

World Cup career
- Seasons: 1980
- Indiv. starts: 6

Achievements and titles
- Personal bests: 174 m (571 ft); Oberstdorf, West Germany (5 March 1974)
Medal record
Men's ski jumping
Representing East Germany
World Championships
Bronze medal – third place	1978 Lahti	Individual LH

Falko Weißpflog (born March 26, 1954) is an East German former ski jumper who competed from 1977 to 1980.

== Career ==
On 5 March 1976, he set the ski jumping world record distance at 174 metres (571 ft) on Heini-Klopfer-Skiflugschanze hill in Oberstdorf, West Germany. The record only lasted 2 days, as Toni Innauer (Austria) jumped 176 metres (577 ft) on 7 March.

He won a bronze medal in the individual large hill competition at the 1978 FIS Nordic World Ski Championships in Lahti.

Weißpflog's best non-world championship career finish was fourth on three occasions, twice in 1978 and once in 1980. Rock and Rap singer Falco took his stage name from Weißpflog.

== Ski jumping world record ==
Date	Hill	Location	Metres	Feet
5 March 1976	Heini-Klopfer-Skiflugschanze K175	Oberstdorf, West Germany	174	571
