= Junge Roemer (song) =

Single by Falco

from the album Junge Roemer
- Released: 1984
- Label: GiG, A&M
- Songwriter(s): Robert Ponger, Falco
- Producer(s): Robert Ponger

Falco singles chronology
"Auf der Flucht" (1982)	"Junge Roemer" (1984)	"Nur mit dir" (1984)

"Junge Roemer" ("Young Romans") is a song by Falco from his 1984 studio album Junge Roemer. The song was also released as a single, it was the first single from the album.

== Background and writing ==
The song was written by Robert Ponger and Falco. The recording was produced by Robert Ponger.

== Commercial performance ==
The song reached no. 8 in Austria and no. 24 in Switzerland.

== Track listings ==
7" single GIG 111 147 (Germany)
7" single GUG 76.12 990 (Germany)
7" single A&M AMS 9769 (Netherlands)

1. "Junge Roemer" (4:04)
2. "No Answer (Hallo Deutschland)" (3:39)

12" maxi single GIG 620 330 1

1. "Junge Roemer" (Extended Version) (7:43)
2. "Brillantin' Brutal'" (3:48)

== Charts ==
Chart (1984)	Peak position
Austria (Ö3 Austria Top 40)	8
Switzerland (Schweizer Hitparade)	24
