= The Spirit Never Dies =

2009 album by Falco

Studio album by Falco
- Released: 4 December 2009
- Genre: Pop; rock
- Label: Warner
- Producer: Gunther Mende; Alexander C. De Rouge

Falco chronology
| Verdammt wir leben noch (1999) | The Spirit Never Dies (2009) |

Singles from The Spirit Never Dies
- 1. "The Spirit Never Dies (Jeanny Final)" Released: 2009; 2. "Kissing in the Kremlin" Released: 2010

The Spirit Never Dies is a 2009 rock album by Falco. The album features eight new songs as well as the final song in the Jeanny Trilogy titled "The Spirit Never Dies".

== Background ==
The album was released posthumously in 2009 as a compilation of unpublished Falco songs. The title track, "The Spirit Never Dies (Jeanny Final)", was also released as a single and reached the top ten in Austria. The track was found by chance after a water-pipe burst in the archives of the recording studio Mörfelden-Walldorf that was used by Falco's producer Gunther Mende in 1987. After the closing of the archives, the tapes were sent to Mende personally, who then had a look at the material, all of which had originally been rejected by Falco's recording label Teldec; this was explained by Horst Bork in an interview mentioning that Falco had tried to use a different style of music at the time that the label did not want to support.

After digital remastering of the tape, and inclusion of New Zealand vocalist Rietta Austin, the song was edited and published under the claim that it was the official third part of the Jeanny Trilogy by the album's producers Gunther Mende and Alexander C. De Rouge.

== Track listing ==
1. "Return to Forever" – 2:08
2. "Nuevo Afrikano" – 4:57
3. "Jeanny, Part 1" – 5:54
4. "Coming Home (Jeanny, Part 2: Ein Jahr danach)" – 5:31
5. "The Spirit Never Dies (Jeanny Final)" – 4:56
6. "Qué Pasa Hombre" (original version) – 4:41
7. "Poison" (original version) – 4:58
8. "Sweet Symphony" – 4:25
9. "Kissing in the Kremlin" – 3:53
10. "Dada Love" – 4:28
11. "The Spirit Never Dies (Jeanny Final)" (The Special mix) – 5:01
12. "Forever" – 2:18

== Charts ==
The album was a hit in the Austrian and German music charts.
