= Data de Groove =

1990 album by Falco

Studio album by Falco
- Released: 25 May 1990
- Recorded: 1990
- Studio: Stereo West Studio, Vienna
- Genre: Pop; synth-pop
- Length: 40:17
- Label: GiG; Teldec
- Producer: Robert Ponger; Falco

Falco chronology
Wiener Blut (1988)	Data de Groove (1990)	Nachtflug (1992)

Singles from Data de Groove
- 1. "Data de Groove" Released: 11 June 1990; 2. "Charisma Kommando" Released: 1990

Data de Groove is the sixth album by Austrian singer Falco, released in May 1990 – a collaboration with producer Robert Ponger. It was dedicated to the upcoming computer era and peaked at number 11 in Austria. It is known to be his most complex and intellectual album. So far it is the only album out of print and therefore quite a rarity, especially on CD format. However, in February 2016 the album became available for download in digital form on iTunes, as well as a stream on Spotify. In 2022, the album resurfaced when a Deluxe Edition was released, with all songs remastered and featured remixes and edits of several tracks.

Two singles were released: "Data de Groove" and "Charisma Kommando".

== Track listing ==
1. "Neo Nothing – Post of All" – 4:45
2. "Expocityvisions" – 4:08
3. "Charisma Kommando" – 4:49
4. "Tanja P. nicht Cindy C." – 3:37
5. "Pusher" – 4:26
6. "Data de Groove" – 4:40
7. "Alles im Liegen" – 5:05
8. "U.4.2.P.1. Club Dub" – 3:41
9. "Bar Minor 7/11 (Jeanny Dry)" – 3:45
10. "Anaconda 'mour" – 0:57

=== Disc 2 on 2022 re-release ===
1. "Data de Groove" (Club Mix) – 6:48
2. "Data de Groove" (Digital-Analogue Version) – 4:00
3. "Data de Groove" (Human Version) – 3:59
4. "Data de Groove" (Instrumental Version) – 4:57
5. "Data de Groove" (Full Length Version) – 4:57
6. "Charisma Kommando" (Club Mix) – 7:34
7. "Charisma Kommando" (Radio Version) – 4:02
8. "Charisma Kommando" (Instrumental Club Mix) – 7:34
9. "Charisma Kommando" (Instrumental Radio Version) – 4:02
10. "Charisma Kommando" (Full Length Version) – 5:39
11. "Neo Nothing – Post of All" (Full Length Version) – 5:31
12. "Tanja P. nicht Cindy C." (Full Length Version) – 4:26

== Personnel ==
- Falco – bass, producer
- Robert Ponger – digital & analog keyterminals, mixer, producer
- Peter Ponger – additional keyboards
- Jens Fischer, Peter Weihe – guitars
- Curt Cress – drums
- Andy Baum, Bernhard Rabitsch, Jocelyn B. Smith, Victoria Miles – background vocals
- Stefan Biedermann – scratches
- Wolfgang Puschnig – saxophones
- Christian Seitz – engineer, mixer at Stereo West Studio, Vienna
- Steve Taylor – mixer at Livingston Studios, London
- John Mallison – mixing assistant engineer
- Ralph Lindner – mastering (digital) at Ham Audio
- Achim Kruse, Ralph Lindner – mastering (analog) at Chateau du Pape, Hamburg
- Lo Breier – cover design
- Juergen Teller – photography

== Charts ==
2022 chart performance for Data de Groove
Chart (2022)	Peak position
Austrian Albums (Ö3 Austria)	5
German Albums (Offizielle Top 100)	15
Hungarian Albums (MAHASZ)	36
Swiss Albums (Schweizer Hitparade)	53
