= Wiener Blut (album) =

1988 album by Falco

Studio album by Falco
- Released: 15 September 1988
- Recorded: 1985–1988
- Genres: Pop; rock
- Length: 47:14
- Labels: GiG; Sire/Warner (25690)
- Producer: Bolland & Bolland

Falco chronology
Emotional (1986)	Wiener Blut (1988)	Data de Groove (1990)

Singles from Wiener Blut
- 1. "Wiener Blut" Released: 29 August 1988; 2. "Satellite to Satellite" Released: 7 November 1988; 3. "Garbo" Released: 1988 (promo 7" vinyl single); 4. "Do It Again" Released: 1988

Professional ratings
Review scores
Source	Rating
AllMusic	3/5 stars

Wiener Blut is the fifth album by Austrian singer Falco, released in 1988. It was dedicated to Falco's daughter, Bianca, recorded in 1987 and produced by Bolland & Bolland. This album was much less successful than Emotional, but in Austria, Germany and Switzerland, it peaked Top 3 and Top 20 in the charts. In 2022, it was remastered and re-issued in a deluxe CD and coloured vinyl format – including, for the first time, many extended mixes of songs and single edits.

== Track listing ==
1. "Wiener Blut" (Viennese Blood) – 3:31
2. "Falco Rides Again" – 4:45
3. "Untouchable" – 3:18
4. "Tricks" – 3:55
5. "Garbo" – 3:52
6. "Satellite to Satellite" – 5:16
7. "Read a Book" – 3:57
8. "Walls of Silence" – 4:41
9. "Solid Booze" – 4:33
10. "Sand am Himalaya" – 4:01
11. "Do It Again" – 5:15

=== 2022 remaster bonus tracks ===
12. "Wiener Blut" (12" Remix) – 7:20
13. "Satellite to Satellite" (Extended Remix Version) – 8:19
14. "Do It Again" (Shep Pettibone 12" Remix) – 8:57

==== Bonus disc ====
1. "Body Next to Body" (Dance Mix) – 6:18
2. "Body Next to Body" (Extended Rock Version) – 6:30
3. "Body Next to Body" (Extended Other Version) – 6:22
4. "Body Next to Body" (Rock Version) – 4:20
5. "Body Next to Body" (Other Version) – 4:16
6. "Body Next to Body" (Radio Version) – 4:20
7. "Satellite to Satellite" (TV-Mix) – 3:26
8. "Satellite to Satellite" (Special Radio Edit) – 3:26
9. "Satellite to Satellite" (Full Length Special Radio Edit) – 4:09
10. "Satellite to Satellite" (Instrumental Version) – 4:24
11. "Do It Again" (Shep Pettibone 7" Remix/Edit) – 4:20
12. "Do It Again" (Shep Pettibone Dub It Again Mix) – 7:53

== Charts ==
=== Weekly charts ===
Weekly chart performance for Wiener Blut
Chart (1988)	Peak position
Austrian Albums (Ö3 Austria)	2
German Albums (Offizielle Top 100)	9
Japan LPs (Oricon)	74
Swiss Albums (Schweizer Hitparade)	12

=== Year-end charts ===
Year-end chart performance for Wiener Blut
Chart (1988)	Position
Austrian Albums (Ö3 Austria)	26
