= Stefan Weber (musician) =

Austrian musician

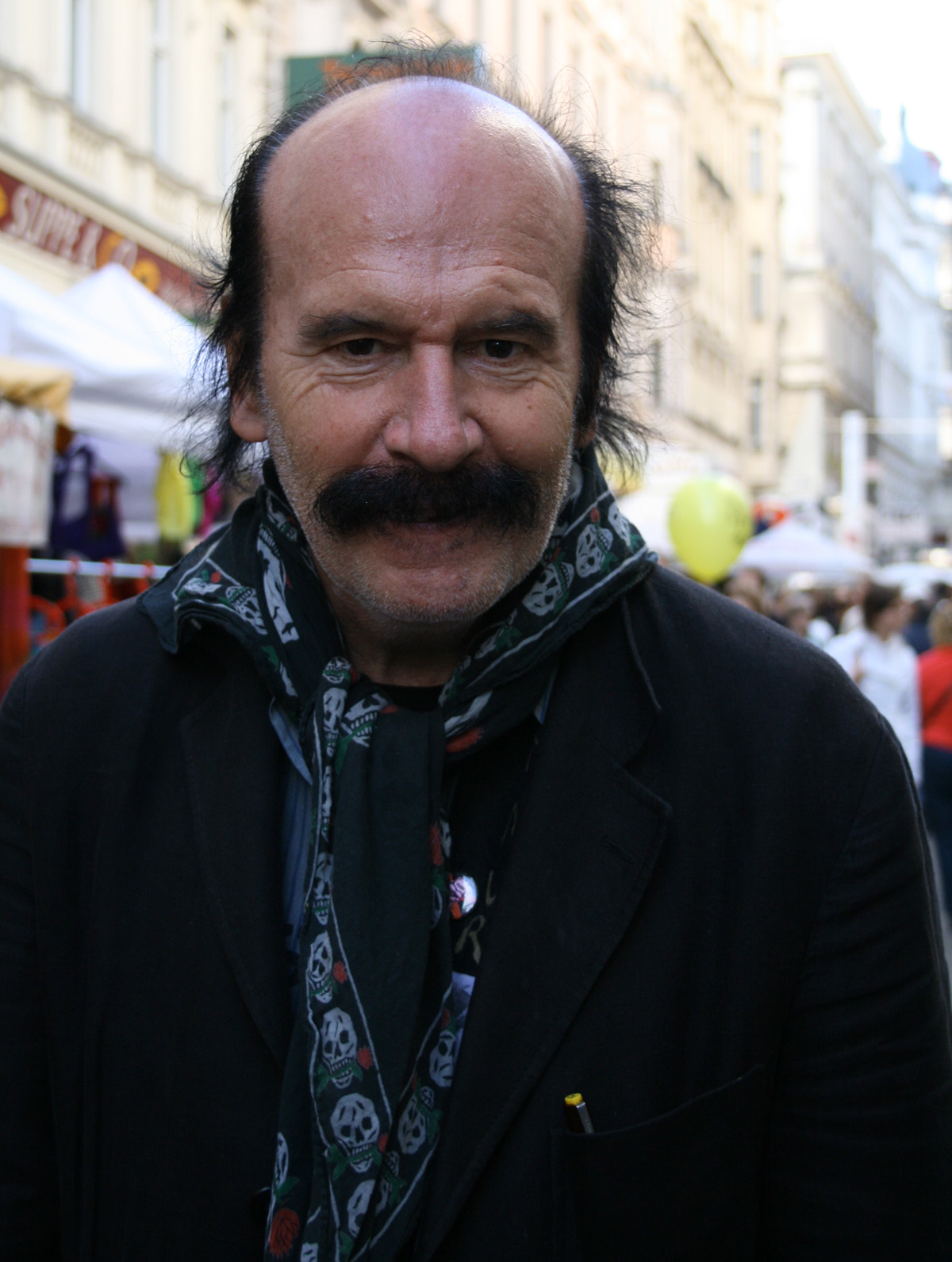
Stefan Weber

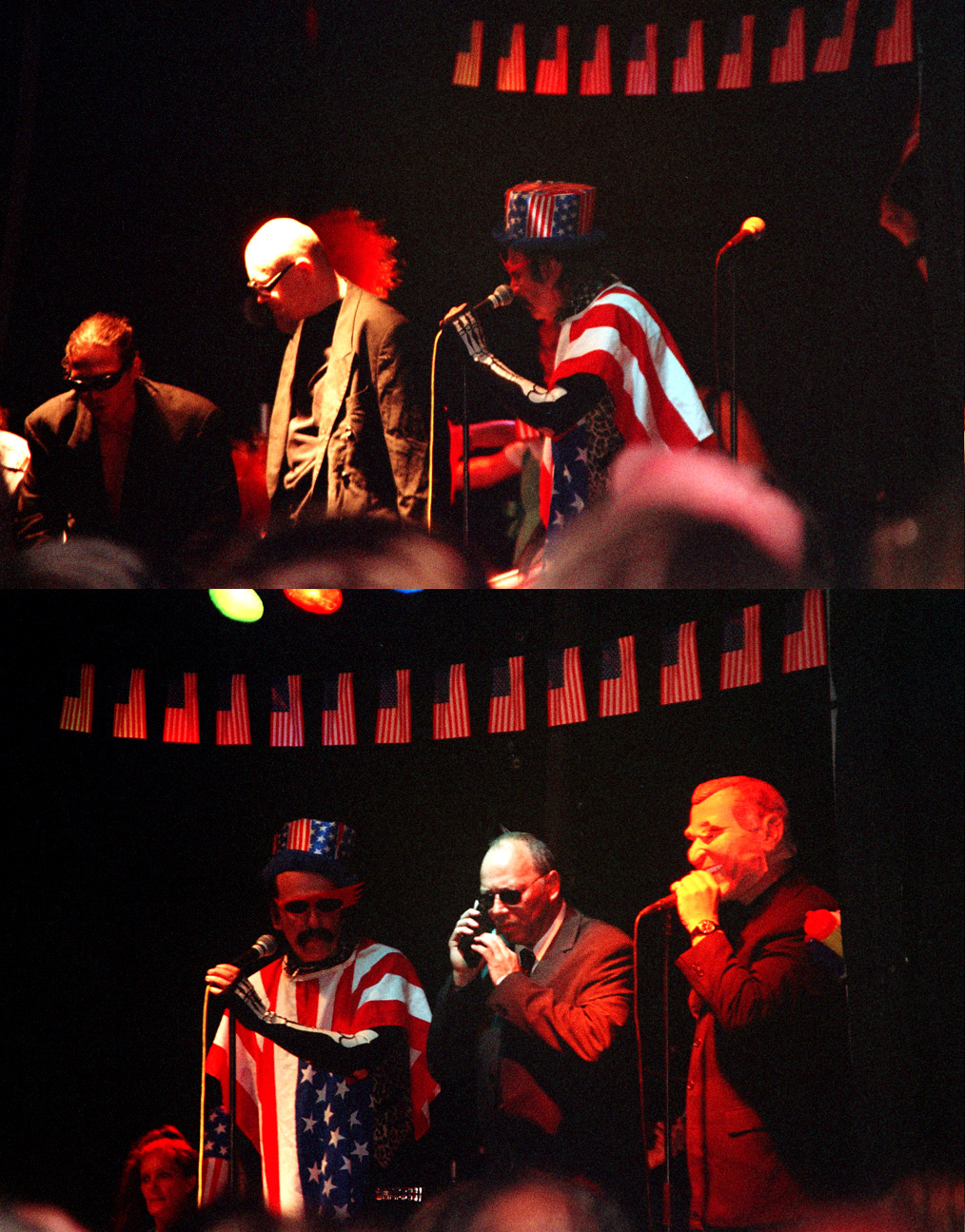
Weber (with hat) and members of Drahdiwaberl in 2006, performing at protests when George W. Bush, president of the United States, visited Vienna

Stefan Weber (8 November 1946 – 7 June 2018) was an Austrian art teacher and the lead singer and Kapellmeister of the Viennese band Drahdiwaberl.

Weber founded the band in 1969 in the wake of the events of 1968. Drahdiwaberl are infamous for their elaborate stage shows which often include bizarre and, as some claim, disgusting elements. For example, in 2003 Weber was charged with illegal possession of firearms after using a pistol on stage. They also presented considerably controversial material, such as the song called "Ganz Wien (ist heut' auf Heroin)" ("All Vienna [is hooked on heroin today]"), which was subsequently banned by the authorities.

Their only hit record in Austria was the song Lonely produced with Lukas Resetarits which peaked at number four on the charts. in the Austrian Single charts. In 1985 the band was able to return into the Austrian charts with the Song Mulatschag. Due to its moderate success it has been one of the last single released so far.

The three albums Psychoterror, MC Ronalds Massaker and Werwolfromantik peaked in the Austrian Top-Ten album charts and every album sold more than 30.000 copies. Psychoterror was certified with Gold in Austria.

As a former high school teacher, Weber had a natural talent of appealing to people in their late teens and early twenties, who are among his most dedicated fans. Early in his career, Falco played bass for Drahdiwaberl. After his leaving in 1983, he and the band produced the single Die Galeere.

He was cremated at Feuerhalle Simmering, where also his ashes are buried.

Drahdiwaberl have been announcing their final concert on a regular basis for many years now.

== Discography of Drahdiwaberl ==
Albums

Year	Album	A
1979	Wiener Blutrausch	-
1981	Psychoterror	8
1982	MC Ronald Massaker	3
1983	Werwolfromantik	7
1984	Wer hat hier Pfui geschrien? (Live)	-
1986	Jeannys Rache	11
1989	Das letzte Konzert	-
1991	The Worst of Drahdiwaberl (Compilation)	-
1995	Sperminator	40
1996	Die größten Hits – Drahdiwaberl (Compilation)	-
1997	Die letzte Ölung	-
1997	Oh! Jesus! (Compilation)	-
2000	Torte statt Worte	-
2004	Sitzpinkler	-
2005	Austropop Kult – Drahdiwaberl (Compilation)	-

Singles

Year	Song	A
1981	Lodenfreak	-
1982	Heavy Metal Holocaust	-
1982	Supersheriff	-
1983	Lonely (with Lukas Resetarits)	1
1983	Plöschberger	-
1983	Die Galeere (with Falco)	-
1985	Mulatschag	28
1988	Greif hier nicht her (with Dana Gillespie)	-

== See also ==
- List of Austrians in music
