= Verdammt wir leben noch (song) =

Single by Falco

from the album Verdammt wir leben noch
- Released: 1999
- Label: GiG; Hansa; BMG; EMI
- Songwriter(s): Falco; Thomas Rabitsch; Thomas Lang
- Producer(s): Falco; Thomas Rabitsch; Thomas Lang; Dietmar Tinhof

Falco singles chronology
"Push! Push!" (1999)	"Verdammt wir leben noch" (1999)	"Europa" (2000)

Music video
- "Verdammt wir leben noch" on YouTube

"Verdammt wir leben noch" ("Damn, we're still alive") is a song by Falco from his posthumously-published album Verdammt wir leben noch (1999). The song was also released as a single.

== Background and writing ==
The song is credited to Falco, Thomas Rabitsch, and Thomas Lang.

== Commercial performance ==
The song reached number 26 in Austria.

== Track listing ==
CD single – Hansa 74321 70498 2 (Sony) (1999)

1. "Verdammt wir leben noch" (radio version) – 3:57
2. "Verdammt wir leben noch" (album version) – 5:18
3. "Verdammt wir leben noch" (remix) – 4:26

== Charts ==
Chart (1999)	Peak position
Austria (Ö3 Austria Top 40)	26
