= Ganz Wien =

1981 single by Falco

"That Scene (Ganz Wien)"

Single by Falco

from the album Einzelhaft
- B-side: "That Scene (Ganz Wien)" (instrumental)
- Released: September 1981
- Recorded: 1980
- Length: 4:22 (single version); 5:06 (album version)
- Label: GiG
- Songwriter: Falco
- Producer: Robert Ponger

Falco singles chronology
"That Scene (Ganz Wien)" (1981)	"Der Kommissar" (1981)

"Ganz Wien" is the debut single by Falco, originally released in 1981. It later appeared on his 1982 debut album Einzelhaft.

The song also appeared on Psychoterror, the 1981 album by Drahdiwaberl, of which Falco was a member.

== Background ==
From 1977 to early 1979, Hans Hölzel was the bassist of Austrian rock group the Hallucination Company, during which he would adopt his stage name Falco. The group, having experienced some success with touring, inspired musician Stefan Weber to reorganize his Viennese Anarcho-punk band, Drahdiwaberl, and in 1979 Falco was invited to join the group. Shortly after leaving the Hallucination Company, Falco became a member of Spinning Wheel, a side project of Drahdiwaberl, where he first began to sing, transitioning from bass player to vocalist and developing his own style. In May 1979, he recorded demos and early sketches in a recording studio, which were to remain unpublished. However, a single from these recordings was released posthumously, 28 years later.

The song was written as a reaction to the growing use of hard drugs in Vienna. In 1980, Falco arrived at a Drahdiwaberl rehearsal with his music and lyrics for "Ganz Wien (... ist heut auf Heroin)" ("All of Vienna [... is high on heroin today]"). Since it did not fit into the repertoire of the band, it served as an interlude between their performances, wherein Falco would take his bass guitar to the edge of the stage and Stefan Weber would step into the background. The number became a cult hit in the new wave scene in Vienna, with Falco experiencing his first successes as a solo artist.

At that time, Markus Spiegel, the then-owner of the Viennese label GiG Records, attended one of Drahdiwaberl's concerts, resulting in two record deals: one for the band, and one for Falco as a solo artist.

When I first saw Falco and his number "Ganz Wien" at a Drahdiwaberl concert in the Vienna Sophiensäle, I realized that I wanted to sign him as a solo artist. Falco left a tremendous charismatic impression on me.

— Markus Spiegel

Spiegel brought Falco together with the music producer and sound mixer Robert Ponger, who composed a song for Reinhold Bilgeri in the summer of 1981, but he did not like it.

== Writing ==
The music and lyrics were written by Falco himself. The recording was mixed by Ponger.

The song first appeared in 1981, on the album Psychoterror. It first charted on August 1, 1981 placing, at its highest, at number 8 in the album charts, and it continued to chart for 8 weeks, until September 15, 1981. This version is often credited to both Drahdiwaberl and Falco. Because the song dealt with the theme of drug use, the song was "indexed" and was banned from being played on the national pop station Hitradio Ö3.

In September 1981, the English version "That Scene (Ganz Wien)" was released as a single, with an instrumental version as a B-side. Falco was credited as a solo artist, without Drahdiwaberl. This version charted for 6 weeks starting on September 20, 1981, placing at its highest at number 11 on the Ö3-Hitparade. The English version was later reissued on the albums Austropop Kult in 2004, and in 2007 on the 25th anniversary edition of Einzelhaft.

With the release of his Austrian number one hit "Der Kommissar" in December 1981, Falco saw both a national and international launch as a solo artist. Both the German version of Ganz Wien, as well as its B-side Maschine brennt, are included on Falco's 1982 album, Einzelhaft.

Ganz Wien remained an integral part of Falco's live concerts, and he also occasionally appeared as a guest star at Drahdiwaberl concerts, including in 1996 at the 1000 Jahre Österreich/100 Jahre Drahdiwaberl show.

Falco's lyrics reflected upon a hedonistic lifestyle, without which a club like Vienna's U4 could never have survived. To this day, Falco's music is played in the U4, and "Ganz Wien" has long been the 'national anthem' for several generations of regular guests.

— Conny de Beauclair

== Commercial performance ==
The English version of the song (titled "That Scene") reached no. 11 in the Ö3-Hitparade (an Austrian radio chart) in September 1981.

In 2017 the German version entered the Austrian chart at number 72.

Chart (2017)	Peak position
Austria (Ö3 Austria Top 40)	72

== Track listing ==
7" single GiG Records GIG 111 107 (Austria, 15 September 1981)

A. "That Scene (Ganz Wien)" – 4:22
B. "That Scene (Ganz Wien)" (instrumental) – 2:32
