= Der Kommissar (song) =

1981 single by Falco

Single by Falco

from the album Einzelhaft
- B-side: "Helden von heute (Europe/US); Siebzen Jahr (Canada); Auf Der Flucht (Brazil)"
- Released: 11 December 1981
- Recorded: 1981
- Genre: New wave
- Length: 3:51
- Label: GiG; A&M
- Songwriters: Robert Ponger; Falco
- Producer: Robert Ponger

Falco singles chronology
"That Scene (Ganz Wien)" (1981)	"Der Kommissar" (1981)	"Maschine brennt" (1982)

Music videos
- "Der Kommissar" on YouTube
- "Der Kommissar" (U.S. version) on YouTube

"Der Kommissar" (German: [deːɐ̯ kɔmɪˈsaːɐ̯]; "The Commissioner") is a song recorded by Austrian music artist Falco in 1981. The song was written by Robert Ponger and Falco. It reached the top of the charts in many European countries and also performed well in the North American charts. An English translated cover version by the group After the Fire in 1982 had greater success in other countries.

== Background ==
The music of "Der Kommissar" was written by producer Robert Ponger and intended for Reinhold Bilgeri. After Bilgeri rejected it, as he felt the song was too soft, Falco reworked it for his 1982 album Einzelhaft by adding his text to the partly mixed down instrumental track.

Falco would have preferred to release "Helden von heute" as the main side (A-side), because the melody hook of "Der Kommissar" seemed too similar to the bass hook of Rick James' "Super Freak" from which Ponger had borrowed it after its release earlier in 1981, but the record company wanted "Der Kommissar" to be on the A-side, because they felt it had more potential. The record company decided on a Y- vs. X-side release for Austria and an A-side for Germany, which was vindicated when "Der Kommissar" reached No. 1 in both countries in January 1982. After this success, Falco's management decided to release "Der Kommissar" (as an A-side) in other countries as well.

The song recorded for other side of the record, the pop-rock "Helden von heute" ("Heroes of Today"), is a tribute to David Bowie's "Heroes". It was recorded in Berlin; Falco stated in an interview that he went to Berlin to follow the "tracks" left there by Bowie, with his albums "Heroes" and Low.

== Commercial performance ==
The song reached No. 74 on the US Cashbox chart in 1983, while failing to chart on the US Billboard Hot 100 or on the UK Singles Chart. Falco would break through with major hits in those countries two albums later, with the Falco 3 singles "Rock Me Amadeus" and "Vienna Calling" in 1986. Updated remixes of "Der Kommissar" were released by Falco in 1991, 1998, and posthumously in 2008.

== Music video ==
In the official U.S. music video, Falco is shown in front of a blue screen with stock footage of Austrian police cars driving the streets at night with blue lights on playing behind him. Falco is lip-syncing the song, partly dancing and at the beginning running in place, to simulate running from the cops. In the European official music video, he is sitting in a kind of interrogation room wearing a white suit and smoking.

== Charts ==
=== Weekly charts ===
Weekly chart performance for "Der Kommissar"
Chart (1982–1983)	Peak position
Australia (Kent Music Report)	7
Austria (Ö3 Austria Top 40)	1
Belgium (Ultratop 50 Flanders)	26
Canada Top Singles (RPM)	11
Finland (Suomen virallinen lista)	5
France (IFOP)	5
Ireland (IRMA)	24
Italy (Musica e dischi)	1
Netherlands (Dutch Top 40)	18
Netherlands (Single Top 100)	17
New Zealand (Recorded Music NZ)	4
Norway (VG-lista)	3
Spain (AFYVE)	1
Sweden (Sverigetopplistan)	4
Switzerland (Schweizer Hitparade)	2
US Dance Club Songs (Billboard)	10
US Mainstream Rock Airplay (Billboard)	22
US Cash Box Top 100 Singles	74
West Germany (GfK)	1

=== Year-end charts ===
1982 year-end chart performance for "Der Kommissar"
Chart (1982)	Position
Austria (Ö3 Austria Top 40)	3
Switzerland (Schweizer Hitparade)	16
West Germany (Official German Charts)	5

1983 year-end chart performance for "Der Kommissar"
Chart (1983)	Position
Australia (Kent Music Report)	55
Canada Top Singles (RPM)	100

== After the Fire version ==
"Der Kommissar"

Single by After the Fire

from the album Der Kommissar
- B-side: "Dancing in the Shadows (US/EU); Nobody Else But You (CAN)"
- Released: 28 May 1982
- Recorded: 1982
- Studio: The Record Plant (New York City)
- Genre: New wave
- Length: 4:03 (single version); 5:43 (album version)
- Label: Epic (NA); CBS (EU)
- Songwriters: Robert Ponger; Falco; Andy Piercy
- Producers: John Eden; After the Fire

After the Fire singles chronology
"Rich Boys" (1982)	"Der Kommissar" (1982)	"Dancing in the Shadows" (1983)

Music video
- "Der Kommissar" on YouTube

Professional ratings
Review scores
Source	Rating
AllMusic	No rating

In mid-1982, British rock band After the Fire recorded an English version, also titled "Der Kommissar", and released it as a single, but the record floundered. Coming off a tour opening for Van Halen, After the Fire was working on material for a new album when in December 1982, the group announced onstage during a concert that they were disbanding. Both the After the Fire and Falco versions were rising on the Canadian charts at the time, but neither had cracked the US pop charts. Around that time, American singer Laura Branigan began working on her second studio album, Branigan 2, and she recorded "Deep in the Dark", a new song written over the melody and arrangement of "Der Kommissar" which was prepared for release.

The After the Fire version finally hit the US Billboard Hot 100 on 22 February 1983, and started rising. The song's music video, which featured British model Annabel Giles received extensive airplay on MTV in 1983 propelling its popularity on US radio. The song entered the US top 40 on 5 March 1983, peaking at No. 5, and spending a total of 14 weeks in the top 40. The single was released under the Epic label, with a catalog number of 03559 and a compilation album, titled Der Kommissar, was released. Amidst all this renewed attention to the composition, Falco's own version, which had done well in some US markets but not charted nationally, was re-released, but the German-language record remained essentially a novelty hit there, charting concurrently with the After the Fire version but not rising above No. 74 on the Cashbox chart.

In Canada, Falco's version had peaked at No. 11 the same late-January week that After the Fire's version peaked at No. 12. After the Fire's record company, CBS, pleaded with the band to regroup, but to no avail. While UK promotional singles for "Deep in the Dark" were pressed (the After the Fire version missed the UK top 40 and the Falco version failed to chart there), Branigan's record company, Atlantic, officially released "Solitaire" in the United States, where that song peaked at No. 7.

=== Charts ===
==== Weekly charts ====
Weekly chart performance for "Der Kommissar"
Chart (1983)	Peak position
Australia (Kent Music Report)	17
Canada Top Singles (RPM)	12
New Zealand (Recorded Music NZ)	13
South Africa (Springbok Radio)	2
Sweden (Sverigetopplistan)	20
UK Singles (Official Charts)	47
US Billboard Hot 100	5
US Dance Club Songs (Billboard)	17
US Mainstream Rock (Billboard)	4
US Cash Box Top 100 Singles	5
West Germany (GfK)	61

==== Year-end charts ====
Year-end chart performance for "Der Kommissar"
Chart (1983)	Position
US Billboard Hot 100	30
US Cash Box Top 100 Singles	31
