= Einzelhaft =

1982 album by Falco

Studio album by Falco
- Released: 1982
- Recorded: 1981–1982
- Studios: Stereo West Studios, Vienna; Arco Studios, Munich
- Genres: Pop; pop rock; funk
- Length: 41:17
- Labels: A&M; GiG/Sony
- Producers: Robert Ponger; Falco

Falco chronology
Einzelhaft (1982)	Junge Roemer (1984)

Singles from Einzelhaft
- 1. "That Scene (Ganz Wien)" Released: September 1981; 2. "Der Kommissar" Released: December 1981; 3. "Maschine brennt" Released: 1982; 4. "On the Run (Auf der Flucht)" Released: 1982; 5. "Zuviel Hitze" Released: 1982

Einzelhaft (Solitary Confinement or Incarcerated!) (1982) is the debut album by Austrian singer Falco. It was released in Austria, Germany, the United States, Japan, Spain, Italy, Canada, Sweden and Finland.

The album achieved some success with its flagship single, "Der Kommissar", an innovative and influential German-language rap song. An English version of the song by After the Fire was a hit in 1983.

A promotional single, "Auf der Flucht (On the Run)", was released in the US and France. In 1983 the single, "Maschine Brennt / On the Run", hit No. 9 on US Club Play Singles.

Other songs on Einzelhaft are heavily indebted to the "Berlin Trilogy" of David Bowie: "Nie mehr Schule" borrows its music from Bowie's instrumental track from Low called "Speed of Life", whereas "Helden von heute" is a transparent rewrite of Bowie's song, "Heroes".

== Background ==
In 1980 Falco, who played in the band Drahdiwaberl, signed a contract for three solo albums produced by Robert Ponger and managed by Markus Spiegel. The first single was "That Scene (Ganz Wien)", which reached No. 11 on the Austrian radio chart Ö3-Hitparade. The German version, which is more popular, is called "Ganz Wien". The song was not noticed in other countries.

== Production ==
In early 1981 Falco and Ponger started to produce the album, and already had a melody for Der Kommissar. Originally Reinhold Bilgeri was to have sung that song but he declined. Impressed by the melody, Falco chose to include it in his debut album. Within three days Falco wrote the lyrics to the accompanying rhythm.

In November 1981 the second single "Der Kommissar" b/w "Helden von heute" was released. It reached the top of the charts in more than 20 countries. In the American Disco charts the song also reached No. 1.

To promote his album Falco also released "Maschine brennt", "Auf der Flucht" and "Zuviel Hitze".

== Re-release (25th anniversary edition) ==
In 2007 the album was digitally remastered and released by Falco's former producers and managers. In Austria and Germany it was released on June 8, 2007, in other European countries it was released in the end of 2007.

== Track listing ==
All songs written by Falco/Ponger, except where noted.

1. "Zuviel Hitze" (Too Much Heat) – 4:31
2. "Der Kommissar" (The Commissioner) – 3:51
3. "Siebzehn Jahr" (Seventeen Years) – 3:54
4. "Auf der Flucht" (loosely "On the Run") – 4:13
5. "Ganz Wien" (All of Vienna) – 5:06 (Falco)
6. "Maschine brennt" (Engine Burning) – 3:36
7. "Hinter uns die Sintflut" (After Us, the Deluge) – 3:16
8. "Nie mehr Schule" (No More School) – 4:36
9. "Helden von heute" (Heroes of Today) – 4:07 (Falco)
10. "Einzelhaft" (Solitary Confinement) – 4:01

=== Disc two (2007 anniversary release only) ===
1. "Nie Mehr Schule" (Anniversary Mix 2007) – 4:03
2. "That Scene (Ganz Wien)" – 4:25
3. "Interview Johann Hölzel 1993 – Kapitel 1 "Aus Hans Hölzel Wird Falco" – 3:59
4. "Interview Johann Hölzel 1993 – Kapitel 2 "Die Ersten 3 Alben" – 3:09
5. "Interview Johann Hölzel 1993 – Kapitel 3 "Erfolg Und Seine Konsequenzen" – 3:37
6. "Interview Johann Hölzel 1993 – Kapitel 4 "Zeitgeist" – 5:28
7. "Interview Johann Hölzel 1993 – Kapitel 5 "Westen, Osten, Norden, Süden" – 4:40
8. "Interview Johann Hölzel 1993 – Kapitel 6 "Suche Nach Der Wahrheit" – 3:25
9. "Interview Johann Hölzel 1993 – Kapitel 7 "Konzentration Der Kräfte" – 4:12
10. "Interview Johann Hölzel 1993 – Kapitel 8 "Kunst Und Verantwortung" – 2:26
11. "Interview Johann Hölzel 1993 – Kapitel 9 "Zukunftaussichten" – 5:03

== Charts ==
=== Weekly charts ===
1982–1983 weekly chart performance for Einzelhaft
Chart (1982–1983)	Peak position
Austrian Albums (Ö3 Austria)	1
Canada Top Albums/CDs (RPM)	31
Finnish Albums (Suomen virallinen lista)	23
German Albums (Offizielle Top 100)	19
Italian Albums (Musica e dischi)	21
New Zealand Albums (RMNZ)	45
Swedish Albums (Sverigetopplistan)	45
US Billboard 200	64

2023 weekly chart performance for Einzelhaft
Chart (2023)	Peak position
German Albums (Offizielle Top 100)	17

=== Year-end charts ===
Year-end chart performance for Einzelhaft
Chart (1982)	Peak position
Austrian Albums (Ö3 Austria)	1
