= The Sound of Musik =

1986 single by Falco

Single by Falco

from the album Emotional
- Released: 1986
- Recorded: 1986
- Genre: Neue Deutsche Welle
- Length: 4:56
- Label: GiG
- Songwriters: Falco; Rob Bolland; Ferdi Bolland

Falco singles chronology
"Jeanny" (1986)	"The Sound of Musik" (1986)	"Coming Home (Jeanny Part II, One Year Later)" (1986)

"The Sound of Musik" is a song by Austrian musician Falco, released as the lead single from his fourth studio album, Emotional (1986). It was written by Falco and Dutch music producers Bolland & Bolland.

John Leland in Spin described it as 'a glide with a little funk guitar (...) and an easy tempo you can move to'.

== Charts ==
=== Weekly charts ===
Weekly chart performance for "The Sound of Musik"
Chart (1986)	Peak position
Austria (Ö3 Austria Top 40)	4
Belgium (Ultratop 50 Flanders)	27
Europe (European Hot 100 Singles)	45
Finland (Suomen virallinen lista)	8
New Zealand (Recorded Music NZ)	29
Switzerland (Schweizer Hitparade)	11
UK Singles (Official Charts)	61
US Dance Club Songs (Billboard)	19
US Dance Singles Sales (Billboard)	40
West Germany (GfK)	4

=== Year-end charts ===
Year-end chart performance for "The Sound of Musik"
Chart (1986)	Position
Austria (Ö3 Austria Top 40)	26
