= Jeanny (song) =

1985 single by Falco

Single by Falco

from the album Falco 3
- Released: 22 December 1985
- Recorded: 1985
- Length: 5:53
- Label: GIG
- Songwriters: Rob and Ferdi Bolland; Falco
- Producers: Rob and Ferdi Bolland

Falco singles chronology
"Vienna Calling" (1985)	"Jeanny" (1985)	"The Sound of Musik" (1986)

Music video
- "Jeanny" on YouTube

"Jeanny" is a song by Austrian singer Falco, released on 22 December 1985 as the third single from his third studio album, Falco 3 (1985). It was written and composed by Falco alongside Rob and Ferdi Bolland, who also produced the song.

Controversial due to its lyrics, which seem to imply an abduction committed by the speaker, the song nonetheless topped the charts in numerous European countries. The single re-entered the Austrian Singles Chart in 2008 at number 56 and in 2017 at number 47.

== Composition ==
The song was co-written by Dutch brother songwriting duo Bolland & Bolland. Ferdi Bolland said that "Jeanny" was the greatest song that he wrote for Falco, and he wrote it with the intent of being a protest song in support of women. "I was in America and saw that they printed photos and small 'Wanted' posters of missing children on milk containers. I wanted to take up this topic and expand it to include missing women." In an interview about the song's origins Rob Bolland explained that it was named after the chairwoman of the Bolland fan club in the GDR. Although her name was Jeanette, she called herself Jeanny. In 1986, Falco said that the narrator of the song is a stalker who lets his thoughts run free. NPO Radio 2 wrote that, "It is suggested that the narrator kidnaps and possibly kills the girl, although this cannot be deduced anywhere from the lyrics themselves."

The "news flash" segment of the track is spoken by German newsreader Wilhelm Wieben.

== Boycott ==
Several feminist associations called for a boycott of the song. Some TV and radio stations in West Germany agreed and did not play the song "for ethical reasons", while others just played it on their charts shows. In East Germany, the song was not on air and playing it in dance clubs was prohibited.

Released in December 1985, the single at first attracted no controversy and received 150 radio plays in a single week; objections emerged only after it had reached number one on the West German chart. By late January 1986, eleven major West German radio stations had taken the record off the air, calling its lyrics "tasteless and offensive". Hans Georg Berthold of Südwestfunk in Baden-Baden argued that crime and the mindset of a sex murderer were no subject for a chart record, while Udo Reiter of Bayerischer Rundfunk said his station was no longer willing to support the record's commercial success.

Falco called the accusations ridiculous, saying that the song mentions neither rape nor Jeanny's death, that she is seen opening her eyes at the end of the video, and that it is a love song. Teldec managing director Thomas Stein likewise dismissed the affair and announced that Jeanny would still be alive on the label's next two singles that year; he also suggested that comparable subject matter in English-language hits went unchallenged because much of the West German public understood too little English. By that time the single had sold 450,000 copies and the album Falco 3 350,000, while copies of the video were reportedly changing hands on the black market for more than $40.

There were demands to prohibit the song in West Germany, but officials denied the application in April 1986. This angered news presenter Dieter Kronzucker, who presented the daily news magazine heute-journal for the West German public TV station ZDF. Following this, further radio stations followed the boycott. In the German federal state of Hesse, the song was aired accompanied by a warning. In the popular music show Formel Eins cutscenes were aired, but only whilst the song was at the top of the charts.

== Charts ==
=== Weekly charts ===
Weekly chart performance for "Jeanny Part I"
Chart (1986)	Peak position
Austria (Ö3 Austria Top 40)	1
Belgium (Ultratop 50 Flanders)	2
Europe (European Hot 100 Singles)	21
France (SNEP)	25
Italy (Musica e dischi)	14
Japan (Oricon Top 200)	5
Netherlands (Dutch Top 40)	1
Netherlands (Single Top 100)	1
Norway (VG-lista)	1
Sweden (Sverigetopplistan)	7
Switzerland (Schweizer Hitparade)	1
UK Singles (Official Charts)	68
West Germany (GfK)	1

=== Year-end charts ===
Year-end chart performance for "Jeanny Part I"
Chart (1986)	Position
Austria (Ö3 Austria Top 40)	4
Belgium (Ultratop 50 Flanders)	39
Europe (European Hot 100 Singles)	31
Netherlands (Dutch Top 40)	12
Netherlands (Single Top 100)	6
Switzerland (Schweizer Hitparade)	4
West Germany (Official German Charts)	1

== Certifications ==
Certifications for "Jeanny Part I"
Region	Certification	Certified units/sales
Austria (IFPI Austria)	Gold	50,000^{*}
Germany (BVMI)	Gold	500,000^{^}
Netherlands (NVPI)	Gold	75,000^{^}
^{*} Sales figures based on certification alone.^{^} Shipments figures based on certification alone.

== "Coming Home (Jeanny Part II, One Year Later)" ==
"Coming Home (Jeanny Part II, One Year Later)"

Single by Falco

from the album Emotional
- Released: 12 October 1986
- Recorded: 1985–1986
- Length: 5:32
- Label: Teldec
- Songwriters: Bolland & Bolland; Falco
- Producers: Rob and Ferdi Bolland

Falco singles chronology
"The Sound of Musik" (1986)	"Coming Home (Jeanny Part II, One Year Later)" (1986)	"Emotional" (1986)

In 1986, Falco recorded a sequel to "Jeanny Part I", titled "Coming Home (Jeanny Part II, One Year Later)", for his fourth album, Emotional. The song was released as the album's single, reaching number 1 in Germany and the top five in Austria, Norway and Switzerland. The single's B-side, "Crime Time", also appears on Emotional.

=== Charts ===
Weekly chart performance for "Coming Home (Jeanny Part II, One Year Later)"
Chart (1986–1987)	Peak position
Austria (Ö3 Austria Top 40)	4
Europe (European Hot 100 Singles)	53
Finland (Suomen virallinen lista)	27
Norway (VG-lista)	4
Sweden (Sverigetopplistan)	11
Switzerland (Schweizer Hitparade)	3
West Germany (GfK)	1

Year-end chart performance for "Coming Home (Jeanny Part II, One Year Later)"
Chart (1986)	Position
West Germany (Official German Charts)	36

== "The Spirit Never Dies (Jeanny Final)" ==
The album The Spirit Never Dies was released posthumously in 2009 as a compilation of unpublished Falco songs. The title track, "The Spirit Never Dies (Jeanny Final)", was also released as a single. The track was found by chance after a water-pipe burst in the archives of the recording studio Mörfelden-Walldorf that was used by Falco's producer Gunther Mende in 1987. After the closing of the archives, the tapes were sent to Mende personally, who then had a look at the material, all of which had originally been rejected by Falco's recording label Teldec; this was explained by Horst Bork in an interview mentioning that Falco had tried to use a different style of music at the time that the label did not want to support. The single reached number 3 in Austria.

The video for the song is an assembly of cut scenes from earlier Falco music videos along with photos and video clips of Falco's girlfriend Caroline Perron.

== TV movie ==
The plot of "Jeanny Part 1" is the basis for the German-Austrian TV movie "Jeanny - Das 5. Mädchen" (Jeanny - The 5th girl), that was released on 30 January 2022 (the 65th birthday of Falco). The movie starred Manuel Rubey who in 2008 portrayed Falco in the biopic Falco: Damn, we're still alive!.

== Music video ==
In "Part I", the Jeanny character is portrayed by 15-year-old Theresa Guggenberger, a student from the dance school associated with the Theater an der Wien. She was selected from those taking part in a formal job casting prior to the video shoot. Despite the public outcry, she never felt uneasy about her appearance and reprised the role in "Part II". The video for "Part I" contains a number of references to crime scenes both real and fictional. The "news break" portion refers obliquely to Jack Unterweger who was still in jail at the time. The "F" on Falco's trenchcoat in the video refers to the 1931 German film M by Fritz Lang in which a blind man marks the murderer with a chalk sign in the same way. The location in the underground canal is the same as in the 1949 film The Third Man. The main location in the video for "Part I" is the Opernpassage in Vienna. The main location in the video for "Part II" is the Gasometer in Vienna.
