= Vienna Calling =

1985 single by Falco

Single by Falco

from the album Falco 3
- Released: 11 September 1985
- Recorded: 1985
- Genre: Neue Deutsche Welle
- Length: 4:08
- Label: A&M
- Songwriters: Hans Hölzel; Rob Bolland; Ferdi Bolland

Falco singles chronology
"Rock Me Amadeus" (1985)	"Vienna Calling" (1985)	"Jeanny" (1985)

Music video
- "Vienna Calling" on YouTube

"Vienna Calling" is a song by Austrian musician Falco, released in September 1985 (and in 1986 in Anglophone markets) as the second single from his third studio album, Falco 3 (1985).

== Background ==
The song was written by Falco and Dutch music producers Bolland & Bolland.

The rapped German-language lyrics tells about Falco's hometown of Vienna, its development and lifestyle. On the one hand, reference is made to the increasingly international environment of the city and the telephone as a rapid means of communication; the question "where are your wives?" ("wohin sind deine Frau'n?") is also asked, suggesting that they are elsewhere; this culminates at the end of the song with the alarm being "red" and "Vienna in need" ("Wien in Not"). For example, the first verse tells of a woman named Stella who "sits" in Rio and "lies" in Tokyo, to indicate that she is not at home when she is called.

The fast pop-rap song is accompanied by a flute motif and a bluesy, clean guitar. Some samples ("hello") are also used, which support the telephone theme. At the end the flute plays a solo.

Falco enjoyed a limited international success with "Vienna Calling" in late 1985, following the worldwide hit of his previous single "Rock Me Amadeus". In addition to reaching the top 10 in several European countries, it also made the top 20 in New Zealand, Canada, and the United States.

== Music video ==
The accompanying music video, directed by Frank Alchezcar and Rudi Dolezal, features Austrian actress Brigitta Cimarolli. The video shows Falco performing the song with lip sync in a traditional Austrian bar, while other people dance a choreography. Continuity is occasionally cut with scenes of phone calls, including Falco calling insistently in a telephone booth in the bar.

== Charts ==
=== Weekly charts ===
Weekly chart performance for "Vienna Calling"
Chart (1985–1986)	Peak position
Austria (Ö3 Austria Top 40)	3
Belgium (Ultratop 50 Flanders)	13
Canada Top Singles (RPM)	13
Europe (European Hot 100 Singles)	44
Finland (Suomen virallinen lista)	21
Ireland (IRMA)	6
New Zealand (Recorded Music NZ)	10
Sweden (Sverigetopplistan)	11
Switzerland (Schweizer Hitparade)	7
UK Singles (Official Charts)	10
US Billboard Hot 100	18
US Dance Singles Sales (Billboard)	28
US Cash Box Top 100 Singles	17
West Germany (GfK)	4

=== Year-end charts ===
1985 year-end chart performance for "Vienna Calling"
Chart (1985)	Position
West Germany (Official German Charts)	70

1986 year-end chart performance for "Vienna Calling"
Chart (1986)	Position
Canada Top Singles (RPM)	94
