= Rock Me Amadeus =

1985 single by Falco

Single by Falco

from the album Falco 3
- Language: German
- B-side: "Urban Tropical"; "Vienna Calling"
- Released: May 1985
- Genre: Neue Deutsche Welle; synth-pop; dance-pop; pop rap
- Length: 3:22
- Label: A&M
- Songwriters: Falco; Rob Bolland; Ferdi Bolland
- Producer: Bolland & Bolland

Falco singles chronology
"Kann es Liebe sein?" (1984)	"Rock Me Amadeus" (1985)	"Vienna Calling" (1985)

Music video
- "Rock Me Amadeus" on YouTube

"Rock Me Amadeus" is a novelty song recorded by Austrian musician Falco for his third studio album, Falco 3 (1985). The single was made available for physical sale in 1985 in German-speaking Europe, through A&M. "Rock Me Amadeus" was written by Falco along with Dutch music producers Bolland & Bolland. To date, the single is the only German language song to peak at number one on the US Billboard Hot 100, which it did on 29 March 1986. It topped the singles charts on both sides of the Atlantic and was Falco's only number-one hit in both the United States and the United Kingdom, despite the artist's popularity in his native Austria and much of Europe.

== Background and production ==
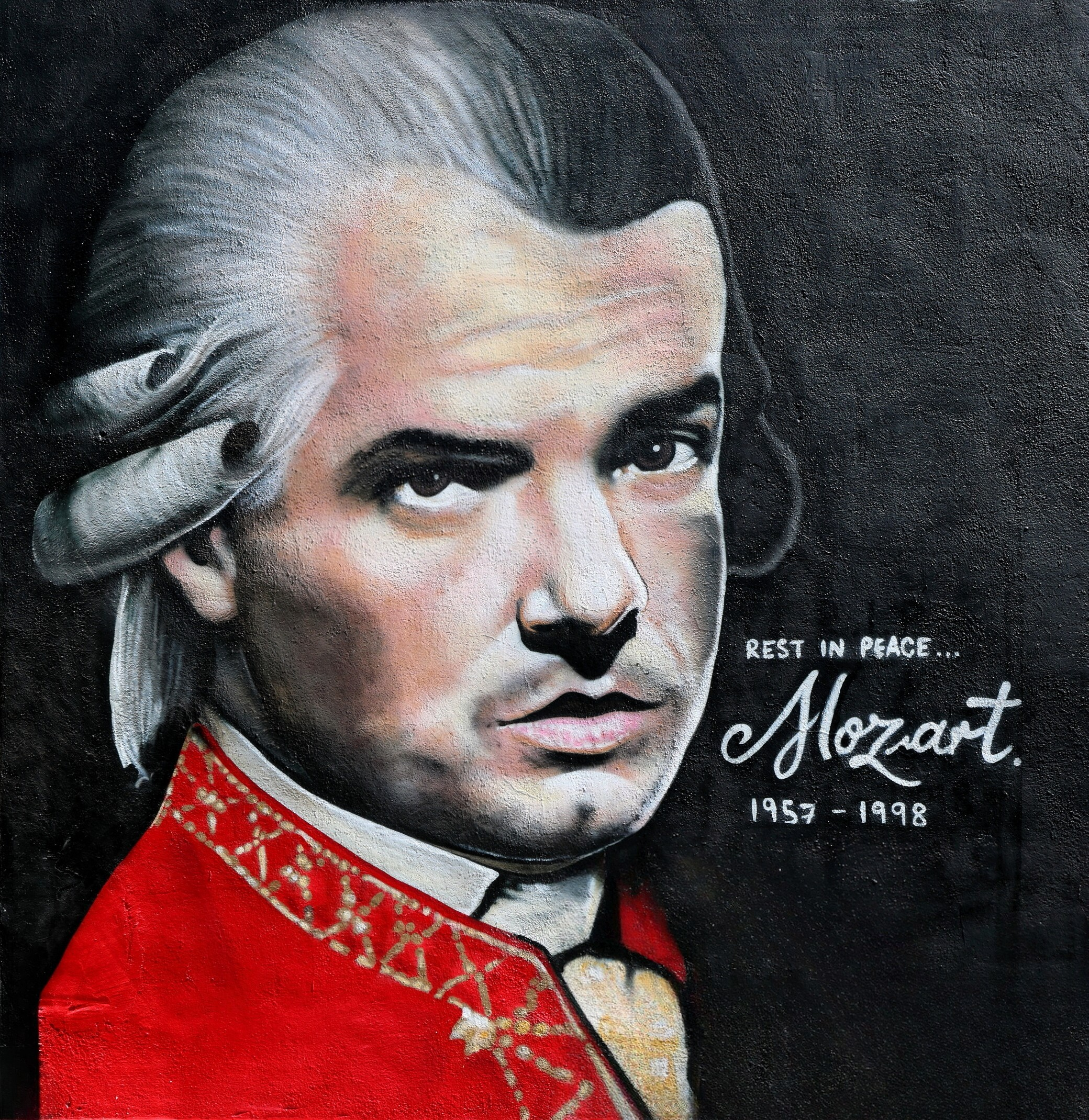
Graffiti by the artist Lushsux, at the Falco Staircase next to the Kettenbrückengasse subway station in the Austrian capital Vienna, depicting Falco in a Mozart outfit

Originally recorded in German, the song is about Wolfgang Amadeus Mozart, his popularity and his debts. A longer version (eight minutes), named the "Salieri Mix", appeared on the initial US release of the album Falco 3. The song was inspired by the movie Amadeus. The US release did not include an English translation, instead remixing the song with an English background voice-over performed by Wie is de Mol? producer Rick McCullough, and presenting the following facts:

1756: Salzburg, January 27th, Wolfgang Amadeus is born.
1761: At the age of five Amadeus begins composing.
1773: He writes his first piano concerto.
1782: Wolfgang Amadeus Mozart marries Constanze Weber.
1784: Wolfgang Amadeus Mozart becomes a Freemason.
1791: Mozart composes The Magic Flute.

On December 5th of that same year, Mozart dies. (Requiem)

1985: Austrian rock singer Falco records... "Rock Me Amadeus"!

== Official versions and remixes ==
The song was released in Europe in 1985 in its original, German-language version. For the international markets (United States, UK, Japan, etc.), several different single and extended mixes were produced by Rob Bolland; none of them were solely an English-language version, but the international single versions reduced the German lyrics. However, the video, which featured the original European version, was used worldwide.

1. Original Version (a.k.a. The Gold Mix) (3:21)
2. Extended Version (7:07)
3. Salieri Version (8:21) (on the international versions of Falco 3 this mix is denoted wrongly as "Solieri Version")
4. Short Salieri Version (4:50)
5. Special Salieri Version (3:59)
6. American Edit (3:10)
7. Canadian Edit (4:02)
8. Canadian/American Edit (3:59)
9. Extended American Edit (5:50)
10. Club Mix 1991 (6:47)
11. Radio Remix 1991 (4:30)
12. Instrumental Remix 1991 (1:29)
13. Live Version 1985 (from the album Opus & Friends) (4:20)
14. Live Version 1986 (from the album Live Forever) (6:04)
15. Symphonic Remix 2008 (from the album Symphonic) (4:52)
16. Live Symphonic Version 1994 (from the DVD Symphonic) (4:12)
17. Falco Biography Mix 2010 (from the 25th Anniversary Edition of Falco 3) (download only) (8:48)
18. Ogris Debris Wiener Mischung 2017 (from the Falco remix series JNG RMR) (4:50)
19. Motsa's Dub Revibe 2017 (from the Falco remix series JNG RMR) (3:10)
20. Wolfram Mix 2019 (from the album "Amadeus" by Wolfram) (4:36)
21. Extended Canadian/American 2022 Re-Edit (from the best of album "The Sound Of Musik") (5:25)

== Commercial performance ==
With "Rock Me Amadeus", Falco became the first German-speaking artist to be credited with a number-one single on both mainstream US pop singles charts, the Billboard Hot 100 and Cash Box Top 100. Prior to Falco, "99 Luftballons" by Nena got to number one on Cash Box, but peaked at number two on the Billboard Hot 100. The single hit number one on the Billboard Hot 100 on 29 March 1986.

In the United Kingdom, where his "Der Kommissar" failed to make the charts, the song hit number one on 10 May 1986, becoming the first single by an Austrian act to achieve this distinction. "Vienna Calling" hit number 10 and three subsequent singles briefly charted.

In Canada, the song reached number one on 1 February 1986. (There, "Der Kommissar" had reached number 11 in January 1983, and "Vienna Calling" would hit number 8 in April 1986.)

"Rock Me Amadeus" would later be ranked number 87 in VH1's 100 Greatest Songs of the 80s and number 44 in VH1's 100 Greatest One-Hit Wonders.

== Music video ==
The song's music video, directed by Rudi Dolezal and Hannes Rossacher (DoRo), mixes elements of Mozart's time with 1980s contemporary society. Falco is shown in a 20th-century-style dinner jacket, walking past people in eighteenth-century formal wear. Later, he is shown dressed as Mozart, with wild colored hair, being held on the shoulders of men dressed in modern motorcycle-riding attire. At the end, the two crowds mix.

== Charts ==
=== Weekly charts ===
Original version
Chart (1985–1986)	Peak position
Australia (Kent Music Report)	15
Austria (Ö3 Austria Top 40)	1
Belgium (Ultratop 50 Flanders)	2
Canada (The Record)	2
Canada Top Singles (RPM)	1
Finland (Suomen virallinen lista)	10
France (IFOP)	79
Ireland (IRMA)	1
Italy (Musica e dischi)	2
Japan Combined Weekly Singles (Oricon)	56
Netherlands (Single Top 100)	46
New Zealand (Recorded Music NZ)	1
Norway (VG-lista)	6
South Africa (Springbok Radio)	1
Spain (AFYVE)	1
Sweden (Sverigetopplistan)	1
Switzerland (Schweizer Hitparade)	2
UK Singles (Official Charts)	1
US Billboard Hot 100	1
US Hot Dance Club Play (Billboard)	4
US Hot Black Singles (Billboard)	6
US Cash Box Top 100	1
West Germany (GfK)	1

Canadian/American '86 mix
Chart (1986)	Peak position
Netherlands (Dutch Top 40)	3
Netherlands (Single Top 100)	2

Sun Diego Remix
Chart (2018)	Peak position
Austria (Ö3 Austria Top 40)	71
Germany (GfK)	63

=== Year-end charts ===
==== Original version ====
Chart (1985)	Position
Austria (Ö3 Austria Top 40)	5
Switzerland (Schweizer Hitparade)	5

Chart (1986)	Position
Australia (Kent Music Report)	69
Belgium (Ultratop 50 Flanders)	26
Canada Top Singles (RPM)	22
South Africa (Springbok Radio)	3
US Billboard Hot 100	28
US Cash Box Top 100	19

==== Canadian/American '86 mix ====
Chart (1986)	Position
Netherlands (Dutch Top 40)	45
Netherlands (Single Top 100)	38

== Certifications ==
Region	Certification	Certified units/sales
Australia (ARIA)	Gold	35,000^{^}
Canada (Music Canada)	Platinum	100,000^{^}
Germany (BVMI)	Platinum	600,000^{‡}
Japan	—	50,000
New Zealand (RMNZ)	Gold	10,000^{*}
United Kingdom (BPI)	Gold	500,000^{^}
United States (RIAA)	Platinum	2,000,000^{^}
^{*} Sales figures based on certification alone.^{^} Shipments figures based on certification alone.^{‡} Sales+streaming figures based on certification alone.

== See also ==
- List of Billboard Hot 100 number-one singles of 1986
- List of Cash Box Top 100 number-one singles of 1986
- Lists of number-one singles (Austria)
- List of number-one singles of 1986 (Canada)
- List of number-one hits of 1985 (Germany)
- List of number-one singles from the 1980s (New Zealand)
- List of number-one singles of 1986 (Ireland)
- List of number-one singles and albums in Sweden
- List of UK Singles Chart number ones of the 1980s
