= Robert Ponger =

- Born: 1950 (age 75–76); Vienna
- Genres: Rock
- Occupations: Record producer, songwriter
- Labels: GiG; A&M; Sony

Robert Ponger (15 May 1950, Vienna) is an Austrian songwriter and record producer, most famous for his work with Austrian singer Falco.

Ponger produced and shared writing credits on Falco's first two solo albums, 1982's Einzelhaft and 1984's Junge Roemer. He co-wrote the song "Der Kommissar", which was a hit for both Falco in its original German and later for the British rock band After the Fire, whose English translation of the song became a top-ten Billboard hit in 1983.

Following his early work with Falco, Ponger co-wrote and produced music by Austrian singer Udo Jürgens. He later reunited with Falco to co-write and produce the singer's 1990 album Data de Groove.

Robert is the twin brother of Peter Bonger, Austrian Jazz pianist and film composer.
