= Bolland & Bolland =

Dutch music producer duo

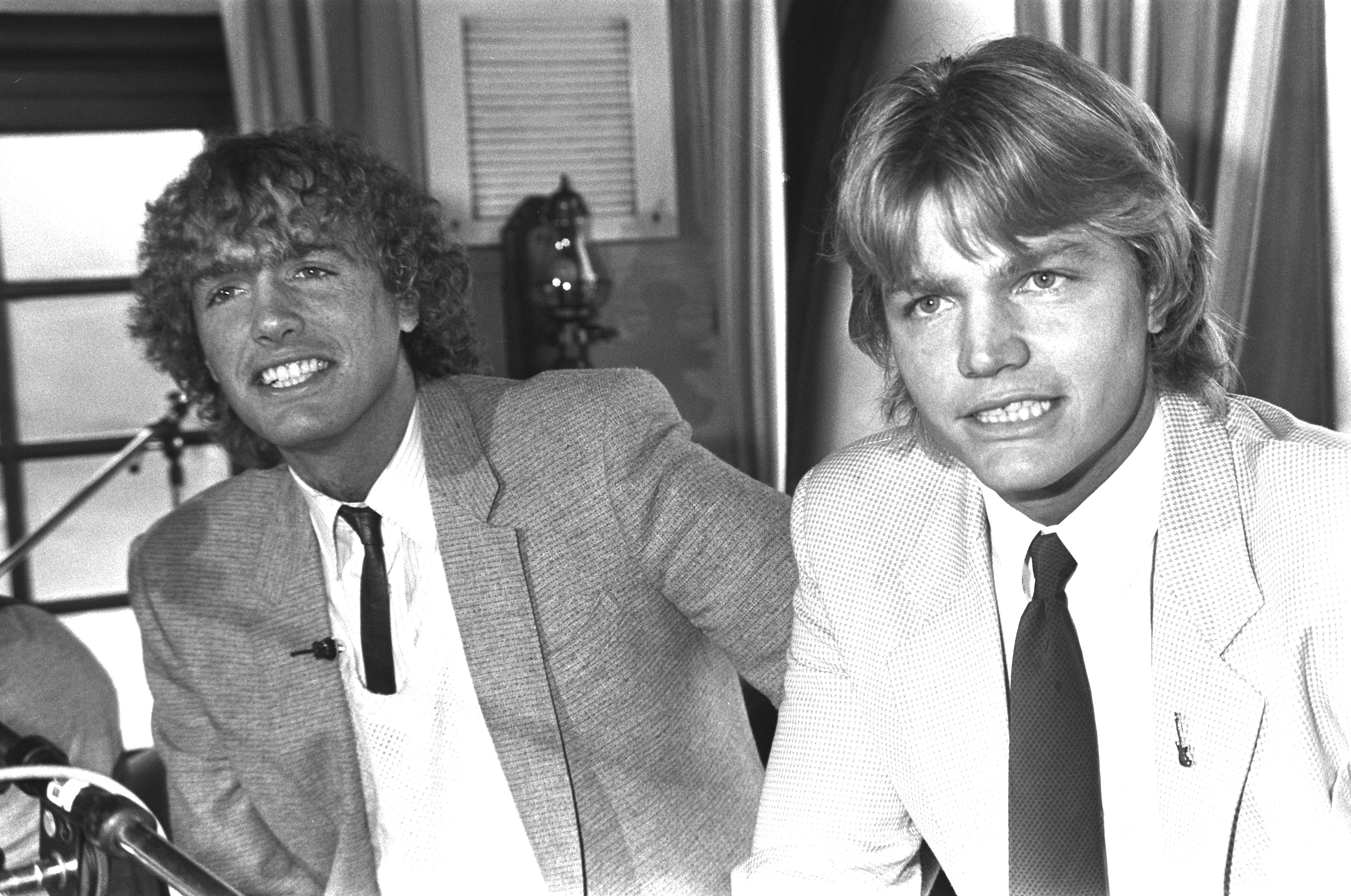
- Bolland & Bolland in 1981

Background information
- Also known as: Bolland, Daniella's Daze
- Origin: Netherlands
- Genres: Folk, a cappella, electronic
- Years active: 1972–1998
- Labels: Roadrunner, Teldec
- Past members: Rob Bolland; Ferdi Bolland

Bolland & Bolland are two Dutch music producers and brothers, Rob Bolland (born 17 April 1955) and Ferdi Bolland (born 5 August 1956). They were born in Port Elizabeth in South Africa.

== Career ==
The duo produced and wrote for such artists as Falco (including his Number 1 hit "Rock Me Amadeus"), Samantha Fox ("Love House"), and wrote the Status Quo hit "In the Army Now" – which they released under their own name in 1981 and which was also recorded by Gerard Joling. As musicians in their own right, they released their first album "Florida" in 1972. Their hit singles career started as early as 1972, with "Summer of '71" in a folk, a cappella-style following the success of Simon and Garfunkel and their Dutch equivalents Greenfield and Cook. When, in 1976, their success started to wane, they turned towards a more electronic sound, an early example of which can be heard in "Spaceman", a 1978 hit in the Netherlands.

Outside the Netherlands, they established their name internationally with the release of the concept album The Domino Theory. The edgy, tuneful album is a critical look at war and US intervention in foreign conflicts from the viewpoint of the foot soldier. It contains the single "In the Army Now", which reached number 1 in Norway and held the top spot for six consecutive weeks. In South Africa, the single peaked at number 9 in May 1982, boosted by increased conscription due to the South African Border War. Francis Rossi, lead singer of Status Quo, is widely quoted as having heard the song while on the Autobahn in Germany. He eventually persuaded Quo to record it, and the single reached number 2 in the UK in 1986. They are the owners of Bolland Studios, located in Blaricum. This was one of the first studios in the Netherlands to host an SSL SL4040 E Series.

In 1984, they released the album Silent Partners. The biggest hit from this album was called "Ten American Girls". Subsequent albums followed through the 1990s. In 1997, Daniella's Daze released an electronic rock album called Slut on the heavy metal label Roadrunner Records. The Bolland brothers produced, arranged and mixed, with lyrics by them and Australian singer Daniella Porsius. The only single, "100% Jesus", received good radio airplay in Australia, but no further releases by the collective followed. The duo later parted ways both musically and personally. In 2021, after Rob was diagnosed with a terminal illness, they resolved their conflicts and reunited.

== Discography ==
=== Albums ===
- 1972 – Florida
- 1973 – Greatest Hits
- 1974 – The Best
- 1975 – Bolland & Bolland
- 1981 – The Domino Theory
- 1984 – Silent Partners
- 1987 – Brotherology
- 1990 – Pop Art
- 1991 – Dream Factory
- 1991 – The Bolland Project (Darwin the Evolution)
- 1995 – Pure
- 1996 – Good for Gold (Best of 1972–1978)
- 2017 – The Golden Years of Dutch Pop Music

=== Singles ===
- 1972 – "Summer of '71"
- 1972 – "Wait for the Sun"
- 1972 – "Florida"
- 1973 – "Ooh La La"
- 1973 – "Leaving Tomorrow"
- 1973 – "I Won't Go Anywhere"
- 1974 – "Mexico, I Can't Say Goodbye"
- 1974 – "Train to Your Heart"
- 1974 – "Dream Girl"
- 1975 – "You Make Me Feel So High"
- 1975 – "Holiday"
- 1976 – "Souvenir"
- 1976 – "The Last Apache"
- 1977 – "Time of Your Life"
- 1978 – "Spaceman"
- 1978 – "UFO (We're Not Alone)"
- 1978 – "Hold On"
- 1979(?) – "Liverpool Eyes"
- 1979 – "Melodrama"
- 1980 – "The Music Man"
- 1980 – "Way Back in the Sixties"
- 1981 – "In the Army" / "Let's Help A.R.V.I.N. Out" / "The Domino Theory Theme"
- 1982 – "Cambodia Moon"
- 1983 – "Heaven Can Wait" / "You're in the Army Now" (Special New Extended Version)
- 1984 – "Ten American Girls" / "Night of the Shooting Stars"
- 1984 – "Tora Tora Tora" (released under the name Numero Uno)
- 1984 – "Imagination" / "Night of the Shooting Stars" (A&M Records)
- 1984 – "Imagination" / "The Boat" (F1 Team)
- 1984 – "Imagination" / "Feels So Good" (Teldec)
- 1985 – "The Boat" / "A Bordo" / "Le Bateau / Das Boot"
- 1985 – "The Boat" (Remix) / "All Systems Go Go"
- 1987 – "Tears of Ice" / "Tears of Ice" (Instrumental)
- 1987 – "Best Love of My Life" / "Rhapsody in Rock"
- 1988 – "And the World Turns On" (Remixes)
- 1989 – "The Wall Came Tumbling Down" (Remixes) / "Stormwarning"
- 1990 – "Charge of the Love Brigade" (Club Mix)
- 1991 – "The Lost Boys" / "Monty – A Place in the Sun"
- 1991 – "Broadcast News" / "Hollywood Kids"
- 1991 – "A Man Man with a Vision Dream Factory" / "Summer of '71" (Live-Version)
- 1992 – The Bolland Project – "Stand Up" / "Is It Really True"
- 1992 – The Bolland Project – "Emma My Dear" / "For a Moment in Time"
- 1992 – The Bolland Project – "Hey Charly" / "For a Moment in Time"
- 1994 – "Love Somebody Now" / "Let's Fly" / "No More Lies"
- 1994 – "The Good Die Young"
- 1995 – "You're in the Army Now" [Maxi-Single]
- 1995 – "A Few Good Men" (Live-Version & Sing Along Version)
- 1996 – "A Night with Sharon Stone" / "Timemachine"
- 1997 – "You're in the Army Now" (Remixes)
- 1998 – The Bolland Project – "Tribute to Falco" / "We Say Goodbye" / "So Lonely"

== Productions ==
=== Singles ===
- 1975 – Ginny Royce – "Wonderboy" / "If the World Needs Love"
- 1984 – Numero Uno – "Tora Tora Tora" / "Tiger" (Instrumental)
- 1985 – Numero Uno – "Madonna" / "Madonna" (Instrumental)
- 1986 – Alexander Robinson – "Perfection" / "It's Paradise"
- 1986 – Bon Bon – "My Boyfriend's Back in Town" / "Mechanical Disco"
- 1986 – Amii Stewart – "Break These Chains"
- 1987 – Numero Uno – "Tattoo" / "Tattoo" (Instrumental)
- 1987 – Roger Chapman – "The Drum" / "Red Moon & New Shoes"
- 1988 – Frank Boyen – "Heut´ Nacht" / "Lass Mich Allein"
- 1988 – Suzy Quatro – "We Found Love"
- 1988 – Samantha Fox – "Love House"
- 1988 – Johnny Logan – "Lonely Lovers" / "(Love You) Just a Little Bit More"
- 1989 – Amanda Redington – "Fatal Attraction"
- 1989 – Suzi Quatro – "Baby You're a Star"
- 1989 – Vicky Larraz – "Besame (Superman)"
- 1989 – Shaun Cassidy – "Memory Girl"
- 1991 – Suzi Quatro – "Kiss Me Goodbye"
- 1991 – Marvin & Marcello – "Guess I'm In Love"
- 1992 – Goddess – "Sexual"
- 1993 – Goddess – "In My Bed"
- 1993 – Goddess – "Je t'aime"
- 1993 – Goddess – "Get Loud (Racism Beat It)"
- 1994 – Goddess – "Spirits in the Night"
- 1994 – Goddess – "Tapdancer (I Wanna See You Mooove)"
- 1994 – Ahmex – "Paparazzi!"
- 1995 – Fancy – "I Can Give You Love"
- 1995 – Ahmex – "Girl"
- 1997 – WOW! – "Keer Op Keer"
- 1997 – WOW! – "Zomer"
- 1997 – WOW! – "Lekker Lang Lekker"
- 1997 – Daniella's Daze – "100% Jesus"
- 1998 – Hard Blauw – "De Wereld Is Van Jou"
- 1998 – WOW! – "Big Beat Boy"
- 1998 – Ian Gillan & Ray Slijngaard – "Smoke on the Water (Rock 'N' Rap Extravaganza)"
- 1998 – So Cheeky – "Super Model"
- 1999 – Dana International – "Free"
- 1999 – WOW! – "The Night Before You Came" / "Music Box Lover"
- 2000 – Follow That Dream – "Follow That Dream"
- 2000 – Rob Bolland & Brigitte Kaandorp & Babs Boys & V.I.G. – "Hoeveel Vrouwen"

=== Albums ===
- 1985 – Numero Uno – Uno
- 1985 – Falco – Falco 3
- 1986 – Falco – Emotional
- 1986 – Amii Stewart – Amii
- 1987 – Roger Chapman – Techno-Prisoners
- 1988 – Samantha Fox – I Wanna Have Some Fun (two tracks)
- 1988 – Falco – Wiener Blut
- 1989 – Rudi Carell Show – one track: "Laß dich überraschen"
- 1989 – Vicky Larraz – Huracán (four tracks, "Besame", "Cables de alta tensión", "Celos", "Solo promesas")
- 1991 – Suzi Quatro – Oh, Suzi Q (included new version of "We Live Forever" from the Brotherlogy album)
- 1992 – Goddess – The Sexual Album
- 1992 – Falco – Nachtflug
- 1995 – Fancy – Blue Planet Zikastar
- 1995 – Ahmex – The Wicked Album
- 1996 – Herman Brood – 50 The Soundtrack
- 1997 – B.E.D.
- 1997 – WOW! – Wild + Ondeugend
- 1997 – Daniella's Daze – Slut
- 1998 – David Vermeulen – Same
- 1999 – Dana International – Free
- 1999 – Falco – Verdammt wir leben noch
- 2000 – Follow That Dream – The Album
- 2000 – Babs (Soundtrack)
