= Falco (musician) =

Austrian musician (1957–1998)

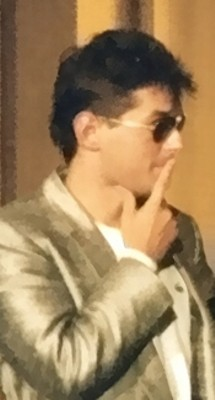
- Falco in 1986

Background information
- Born: Johann Hölzel; 19 February 1957; Vienna, Austria
- Died: 6 February 1998 (aged 40) between Villa Montellano and Puerto Plata, Dominican Republic
- Cause of death: Car crash
- Genres: New wave; Neue Deutsche Welle; rock; pop; hip-hop
- Occupations: Musician; singer; composer
- Instruments: Vocals; bass guitar; guitar
- Years active: 1975–1998
- Labels: Sony; EMI; Warner; A&M
- Website: officialfalco.com

Johann "Hans" Hölzel (German: [ˈjoːhan hans ˈhœltsl̩]; 19 February 1957 – 6 February 1998), better known by his stage name Falco (from Falko Weißpflog), was an Austrian musician. He had several international hits, including "Der Kommissar" (1981), "Rock Me Amadeus", "Vienna Calling", "Jeanny", "The Sound of Musik", "Coming Home (Jeanny Part II, One Year Later)", and posthumously released "Out of the Dark".

"Rock Me Amadeus" reached No. 1 on the Billboard charts in 1986, making Falco the only artist in history to score a number-one hit with a German-language song in the United States. (Note: Bert Kaempfert also reached No. 1 in January 1961 but with the instrumental "Wonderland by Night")

According to his estate, he has sold 20 million albums and 40 million singles, making him the best-selling Austrian singer of all time. Falco died in a traffic collision at the age of 40 in 1998.

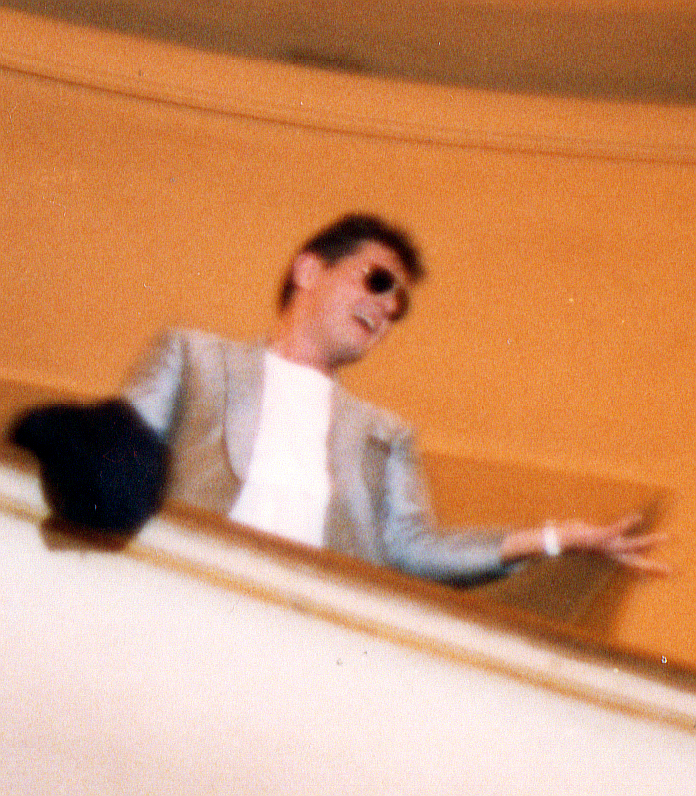
Falco, 1986

== Early life ==
Johann Hölzel was born on 19 February 1957 to Maria (née Saurer), from Bad Tatzmannsdorf in Burgenland, a laundry branch manager, and Alois Hölzel, from Lower Austria, a machine factory foreman, on Ziegelofengasse in Margareten, a working class district of Vienna. Maria said that she had been pregnant with triplets. As it was a dizygotic pregnancy, she had a miscarriage of the identical twins during the third month and Falco, who was conceived via a separate ovum, survived.

In 1963, Hölzel began his schooling at a Roman Catholic public school; four years later, at age ten, he switched to the Rainergymnasium in Margareten. He was still a child when his father left the family, and he was raised by his mother.

He began to show signs of unusual musical talent very early. As a toddler, he was able to keep time with the drumbeat in songs he heard on the radio. He was given a child's grand piano for his fourth birthday; a year later, his birthday gift was a record player which he used to play music by Elvis Presley, Cliff Richard, and the Beatles.

Hölzel wanted to be a pop star from a very early age. At age 16, he attended the Vienna Conservatoire, but he became frustrated and soon left. His mother insisted he begin an apprenticeship with the Austrian employee pension insurance institute. This too only lasted a short time. At seventeen, he entered military service in the Austrian army for eight months.

== Early career ==
In the late 1970s, Hölzel became part of the Viennese nightlife, which included not just music but also striptease, performance art and a general atmosphere of satirizing politics and celebrating chaos. He played bass guitar in several bands under various pseudonyms, including "John Hudson" and "John DiFalco".

From 1977 to early 1979, Hans Hölzel was the bassist of Austrian rock group the Hallucination Company, during which he would adopt his stage name Falco, from Falko Weißpflog. Despite being closely tied with the Viennese underground club scene, Falco looked uncharacteristically clean-cut. In contrast to shabbier fashions, he had short hair (due to his military service) and wore Ray-Ban Wayfarer sunglasses and suits.

Hallucination Company inspired musician Stefan Weber to reorganize his Viennese Anarcho-punk band, Drahdiwaberl, an Austrian group that employed shock tactics and stage antics, and in 1979 Falco was invited to join the group.

Shortly after leaving the Hallucination Company, Falco became a member of Spinning Wheel, a side project of Drahdiwaberl, where he first began to sing, transitioning from bass player to vocalist and developing his own style.

In May 1979, he recorded demos and early sketches in a recording studio, from which a single was released posthumously 28 years later.

His distinct style, coupled with his singing performance of the song "Ganz Wien" (literally "All Vienna", tag-lined "That Scene") led to manager Markus Spiegel offering to sign Falco in 1981. Ironically, it was at a concert for drug prevention and "Ganz Wien" has a line proclaiming "All Vienna is on heroin today."

== Solo artist ==
In 1981, with his large ego interfering with group performances, Falco became a solo artist.

Once Falco was signed as a solo artist, he continued composing his own music and hired songwriter Robert Ponger. In 1981, Falco brought his intended first single "Helden von heute" to manager Horst Bork, but received a lukewarm reception. Bork felt that the B-side "Der Kommissar" was much stronger. Falco was hesitant, since the track is a German-language song about drug consumption that combines rap verses with a sung chorus. Though beginning to break through in America, rap was still rare in Western Europe at the time. Bork insisted and the song became a number-one success in Germany, France, Italy, Spain and Japan, while charting high in several other nations.

Though "Der Kommissar" failed to break through in the UK and US, the British rock band After the Fire covered the song with new English lyrics. This version charted at number five on the Billboard Hot 100 in the U.S. That same year, American singer Laura Branigan recorded a non-single version of the song with new English lyrics under the title "Deep in the Dark" on her album Branigan 2.

Einzelhaft, the album on which "Der Kommissar" appears, also topped the charts in Austria and the Netherlands.

Falco and Ponger returned to the studio in 1983 to record Falco's second album Junge Roemer ("Young Romans"). It was a difficult project, as the two artists felt immense pressure to match their previous success and the recording process was plagued by delays. Junge Roemer was released in 1984. Even though the music video for the single "Hoch wie nie" ("Higher Than Ever") was aired on prime time TV in Austria, it failed to ignite interest internationally.

Junge Roemer only charted in Austria where it went to number one. Outside of Austria and Spain, the title track and main single "Junge Roemer" failed to repeat the success of "Der Kommissar". As a reaction, Falco began to experiment with English lyrics in an effort to broaden his appeal. He parted ways with Ponger and chose a new production team: the brothers Rob and Ferdi Bolland from the Netherlands.

Falco recorded "Rock Me Amadeus", inspired in part by the Oscar-winning film Amadeus, and the song became a worldwide hit in 1986. It reached No. 1 in over a dozen countries, including the US, UK, and Japan, bringing the success that had eluded him in markets a few years earlier. The song remained in the top spot of the Billboard Hot 100 for three weeks. His album Falco 3 peaked at the number three position on the Billboard album charts. Unusually for a white act, especially one from mainland Europe, "Rock Me Amadeus" reached number six in the Billboard Top R&B Singles Chart, and Falco 3 peaked at number 18 on the Top R&B/Hip-Hop Albums charts.

"Vienna Calling" was another international pop hit, peaking at No. 18 of the Billboard Charts and No. 17 on the US Cash Box Charts in 1986. A double A-side 12" single featuring remixes of those two hits peaked at No. 4 on the US Dance/Disco charts.

"Jeanny", the third release from the album Falco 3, brought the performer back to the top of the charts across Europe. Highly controversial when it was released in Germany and the Netherlands, the story of "Jeanny" was told from the point of view of and is sympathetic to a possible rapist and murderer. Several DJs and radio stations refused to play the ballad, which was ignored in the US. However, it became a hit in many European countries, and inspired a sequel on his next album.

After the success of "Rock Me Amadeus", there were talks of crossing over more permanently into the U.S. by working with American producers and collaborating with other American artists. These possibilities fell through, in part, due to Falco's personal problems. At this point in his career, he was dangerously addicted to alcohol and other drugs.

In 1986, the album Emotional was released, produced by Rob and Ferdi Bolland (Bolland & Bolland). Songs on the album included "Coming Home (Jeanny Part II, One Year Later)", "The Kiss of Kathleen Turner", and "Kamikaze Capa" which was written as a tribute to the late photojournalist Robert Capa. "The Sound of Musik" was another international success, and a Top 20 US dance hit, though it failed to make the US pop charts.

In 1987, Falco went on the Emotional world tour ending in Japan.

Also in 1987, he sang a duet with Brigitte Nielsen, "Body Next to Body"; the single was a Top 10 hit in German-speaking countries.

Falco released Wiener Blut ("Viennese Blood") in 1988.

His 1992 comeback attempt—the album Nachtflug ("Night Flight"), which included the single "Titanic"—was successful in Austria only.

Out of the Dark (Into the Light) was released posthumously in 1998. It charted at number one in Austria for 21 weeks.

== Personal life ==
Falco has been described by those who knew him as having a complex personality. He has been called ambitious, eccentric, caring, egotistical and deeply insecure. Thomas Rabitsch, a keyboardist who met Falco when the aspiring pop star was only 17 years old, said he was a quiet young man and precise bass player, but also arrogant and with a "very high opinion of himself". Markus Spiegel, the manager who discovered Falco, admitted that the pop star was "an extremely difficult artist" and known womanizer. Peter Vieweger, a guitarist who knew Falco before his success and continued to play in Falco's touring band and on his albums, remembers Falco as being "scared he would fail or be unmasked and not be as good as people thought he was".

Through the 1980s and into the 1990s, he became dependent on alcohol and cocaine. When under the influence he was unreliable at best and abusive at worst. Ferdi Bolland recalls that Falco was often so severely intoxicated that the writing process revolved around his "inability to be coherent, to even stand for a long time". Despite pleas from his manager and collaborators to get help, Falco stubbornly refused.

While Falco was in a relationship with Isabella Vitkovic, she gave birth to a girl, Katharina, in 1986. The couple married in 1988, but it was a "love–hate" relationship, as Katharina describes it, and the marriage was short-lived. He believed that Katharina was his own daughter until DNA paternity testing proved otherwise when she was seven years old in 1993. After this, Katharina's relationship with him became strained. Though they kept in contact, she took her mother's surname and claimed that she was written out of his will. She was 12 years old when he died. She did not reconcile with Falco's mother, Maria Hölzel, until a few years before Hölzel's death at the age of 87 in April 2014. Katharina published a memoir in 2008 called Falco war mein Vater (Falco Was My Father).

=== Residences ===
In the 1990s, Falco moved to the Dominican Republic and lived there as a tax exile.

Around a year before his death, he had a house in Gars am Kamp. He bought the villa in 1987 and lived there in the summers with his mother. The place known as Falco-Villa is today a museum.

== Death ==
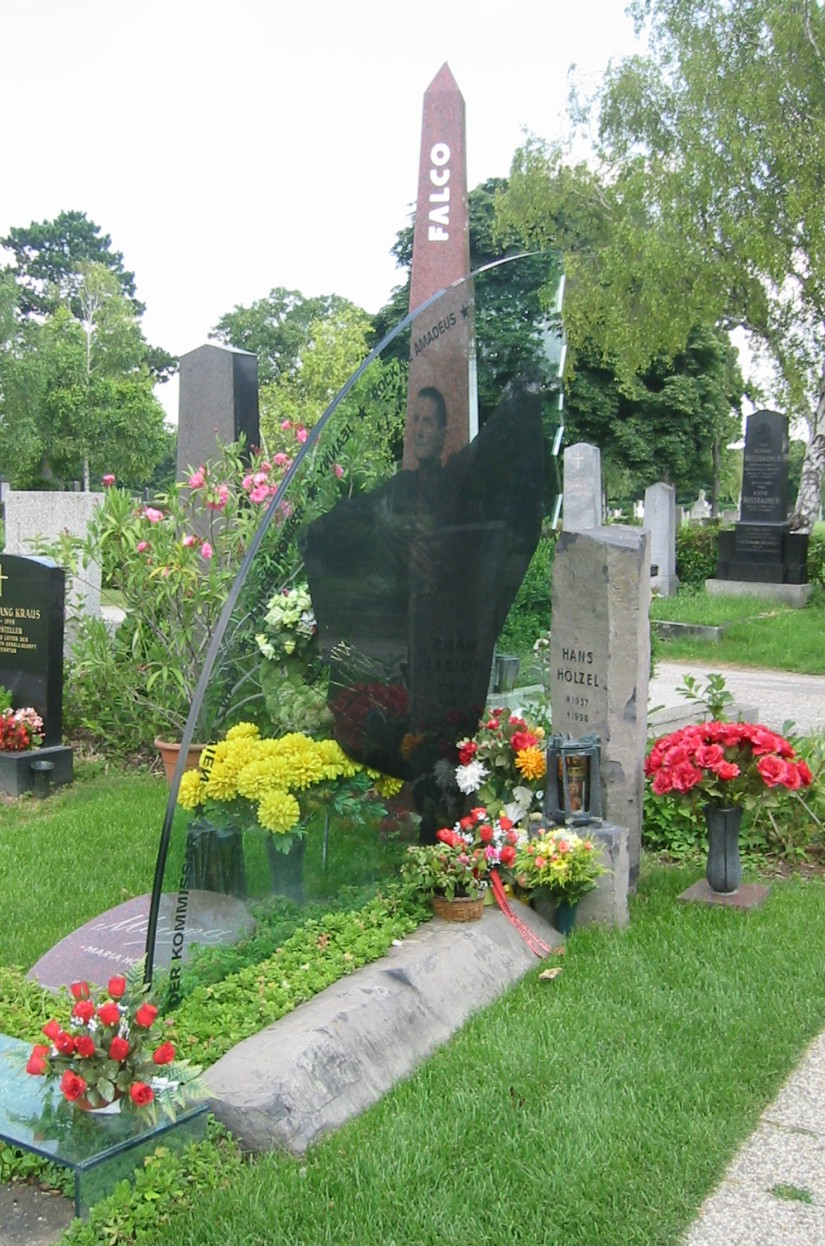
Falco's grave at Vienna Central Cemetery

Hölzel died of severe injuries received on 6 February 1998, at the age of 40, when his Mitsubishi Pajero collided with a bus on the road linking the towns of Villa Montellano and Puerto Plata in the Dominican Republic. At the time of his death, he was planning a comeback, which was successful with the posthumously released album Out of the Dark (Into the Light). His body was returned to Austria and buried at the Vienna Central Cemetery. Even decades after his death, Falco’s grave remains one of the most visited graves in the Vienna Central Cemetery and continues to attract visitors.

== Legacy ==
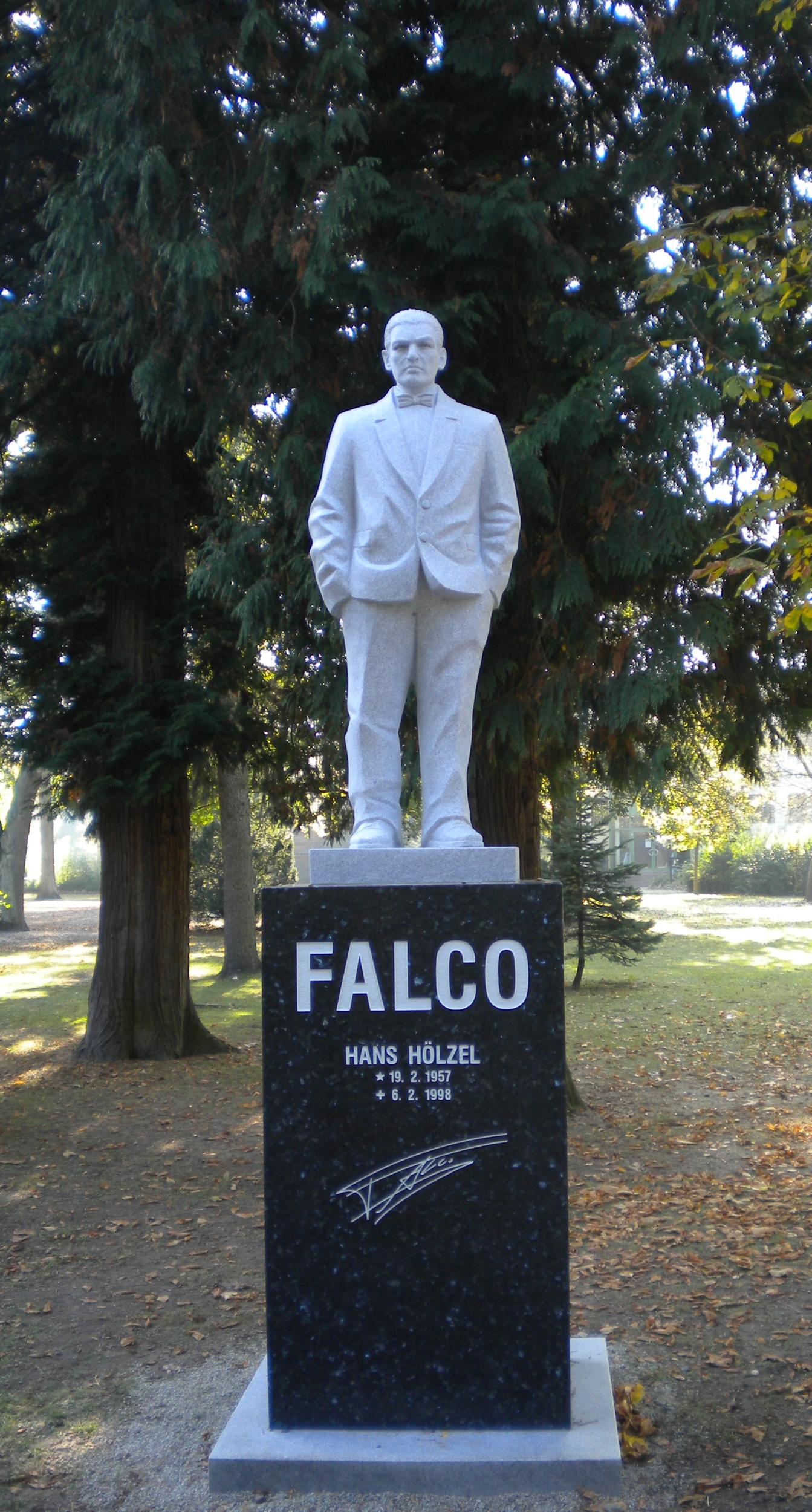
A Falco statue in Gars am Kamp, Lower Austria

In the U.S., Falco's music has been classified under the genre of rap and he has been considered the father of white rap.

In 1998, Rob and Ferdi Bolland (Dutch producers and co-writers on about half of Falco's albums) released the EP Tribute to Falco under the name The Bolland Project feat. Alida. The title track featured samples of Falco's music; the other tracks were "We Say Goodbye" and "So Lonely".

The film Falco: Damn It, We're Still Alive! was released in Austria on 7 February 2008, ten years and one day after Hölzel's death. Written and directed by Thomas Roth, the movie features musician Manuel Rubey as adult Falco. The end credits include the line "With love, Ferdi & Rob", his frequent collaborators the Bollands. This title also lends its name to a posthumously released album by Falco, Verdammt wir leben noch, which translates to "Damn, we're still alive!"

Cover versions of "Rock Me Amadeus" have been recorded by Megaherz on the album Kopfschuss, Edguy on the album Space Police: Defenders of the Crown, and by Front Line Assembly on the album Wake Up the Coma. The track has been sampled by groups including the Bloodhound Gang, who also refer to Hölzel in their 1999 song "Mope", and by German rapper Fler in "NDW 2005" from Neue Deutsche Welle.

In 2023, "Rock Me Amadeus - Das Falco Musical" was performed at the Ronacher.

There is a staircase in Margareten, Vienna that is named after him.

In Vienna, Falco's portrait hangs above the entrance to U4 (club). In 1979, Falco, as Hans Hölzl, had his debut as a bassist with the band Spinning Wheel at Copacabana, now the U4. The building was first planned as a subway station, then as a city wine bar, which never opened.

In 2017, a petition was launched to rename Vienna International Airport after Falco. It failed to get the required number of signatures to be considered.

== Discography ==
Studio albums

- Einzelhaft (1982)
- Junge Roemer (1984)
- Falco 3 (1985)
- Emotional (1986)
- Wiener Blut (1988)
- Data de Groove (1990)
- Nachtflug (1992)
- Out of the Dark (Into the Light) (1998)
- Verdammt wir leben noch (1999)
- The Spirit Never Dies (2009)

== See also ==
- List of Austrians in music
