= Wig Wam discography =

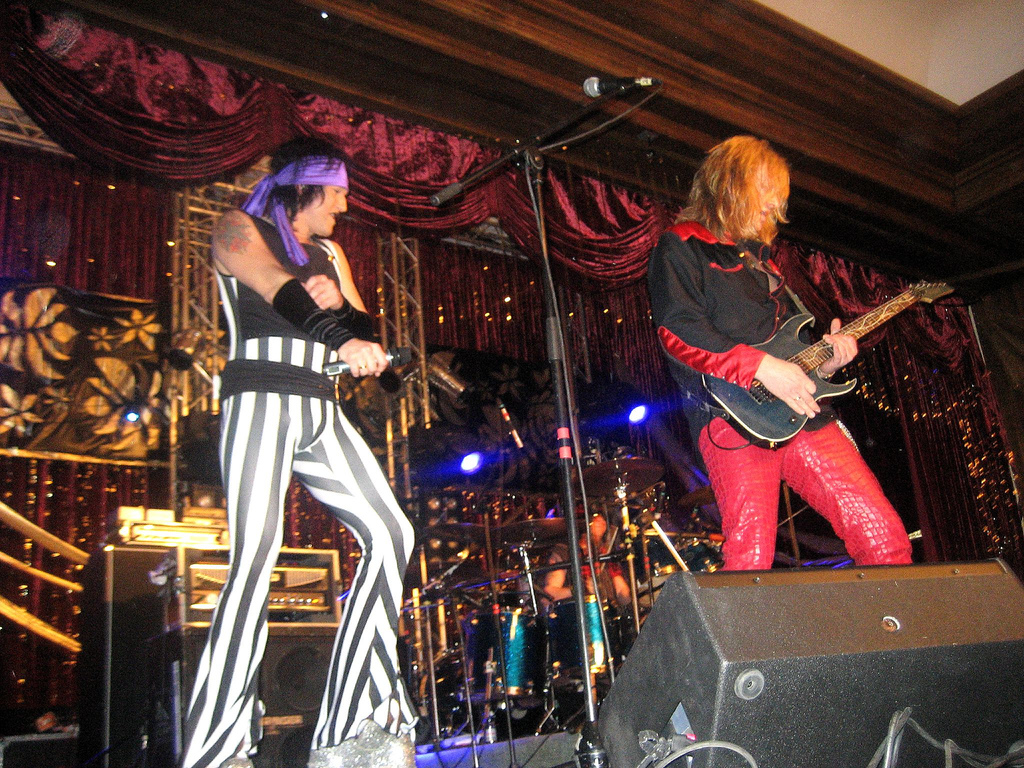
- Wig Wam performing live in 2007
- Studio albums: 6
- Live albums: 1
- Singles: 17
- Video albums: 1
- Music videos: 7

The discography of the Norwegian rock band Wig Wam includes six studio albums, one live album, 17 singles, one video album and seven music videos. The band was formed in Halden in 2001 and released their debut studio album, 667.. The Neighbour of the Beast, in 2004. The album was reissued in 2005 with a new title, Hard to Be a Rock'n Roller, and additional songs. The band achieved international fame later that year when they represented Norway in the Eurovision Song Contest with the song "In My Dreams", written by guitarist Teeny, and placed ninth. The song became a significant hit for the band in Norway and in other countries around Europe and Asia.

Wig Wam released their second studio album, Wig Wamania, in 2006 and their first live album, Live in Tokyo, the following year. The band's third studio album, Non Stop Rock'n Roll, was released in 2010 and their fourth album, Wall Street, in 2012. After thirteen years together, Wig Wam split up in 2014. The band reunited in 2019 and released the album Never Say Die in 2021. Wig Wam experienced a resurgence in popularity internationally the following year when their single "Do Ya Wanna Taste It" was used as the theme song for the HBO Max television series Peacemaker. The band's sixth studio album, Out of the Dark, was released in 2023.

== Albums ==
=== Studio albums ===
| Title | Album details | Peak chart positions | |
| Title | Album details | NOR | SWI |
|---|---|---|---|
| 667.. The Neighbour of the Beast | Released: 8 March 2004; Label: Global Music | — | — |
| Wig Wamania | Released: 16 March 2006; Label: Voices of Wonder | 10 | — |
| Non Stop Rock'n Roll | Released: 28 January 2010; Label: Music Norway | 3 | — |
| Wall Street | Released: 18 May 2012; Label: Frontiers Records | 19 | — |
| Never Say Die | Released: 22 January 2021; Label: Frontiers Records | — | 74 |
| Out of the Dark | Released: 2023; Label: Frontiers Records | — | — |

=== Reissues ===
| Title | Album details | Peak chart positions | |
| Title | Album details | NOR | SWI |
|---|---|---|---|
| Hard to Be a Rock'n Roller | Released: 28 June 2005; Label: Voices of Wonder | 10 | — |

=== Live albums ===
| Title | Album details |
|---|---|
| Live in Tokyo | Released: 11 June 2007; Label: Voices of Wonder, King Records |

== Singles ==
| Title | Year | Peak chart positions | | Album |
| Title | Year | NOR | SWE | Album |
|---|---|---|---|---|
| "I Turn to You" | 2004 | — | — | 667.. The Neighbour of the Beast |
| "Crazy Things" | 2004 | — | — | 667.. The Neighbour of the Beast |
| "Hard to Be a Rock'n Roller" | 2005 | — | — | Hard to Be a Rock'n Roller |
| "In My Dreams" | 2005 | 1 | 26 | Hard to Be a Rock'n Roller |
| "Bless the Night" | 2005 | 11 | — | Hard to Be a Rock'n Roller |
| "Gonna Get You Someday" | 2006 | 5 | — | Wig Wamania |
| "Daredevil Heat" | 2006 | — | — | Wig Wamania |
| "At the End of the Day" | 2006 | — | — | Wig Wamania |
| "Bygone Zone" | 2006 | 16 | — | Wig Wamania |
| "Do Ya Wanna Taste It" | 2010 | 11 | — | Non Stop Rock'n Roll |
| "Wall Street" | 2012 | — | — | Wall Street |
| "The Bigger The Better" | 2012 | — | — | Wall Street |
| "Never Say Die" | 2020 | — | — | Never Say Die |
| "Kilimanjaro" | 2020 | — | — | Never Say Die |
| "Out of the Dark" | 2022 | — | — | Out of the Dark |
| "High n Dry" | 2023 | — | — | Out of the Dark |
| "Forevermore" | 2023 | — | — | Out of the Dark |

== Videography ==
=== Video albums ===
| Title | Album details |
|---|---|
| Made in Japan | Released: 11 June 2007; Label: Voices of Wonder, King Records |

=== Music videos ===
| Title | Year | Album |
|---|---|---|
| "Hard to Be a Rock'n Roller" | 2005 | Hard to Be a Rock'n Roller |
| "Bless the Night" | 2005 | Hard to Be a Rock'n Roller |
| "Gonna Get You Someday" | 2006 | Wig Wamania |
| "Do Ya Wanna Taste It" | 2010 | Non Stop Rock'n Roll |
| "Never Say Die" | 2020 | Never Say Die |
| "Kilimanjaro" | 2020 | Never Say Die |
| "Out of the Dark" | 2022 | Out of the Dark |

== Other appearances ==
| Song | Year | Album |
|---|---|---|
| "I Was Made for Lovin' You" (with Bruce Kulick) | 2005 | Gods of Thunder: A Norwegian Tribute to Kiss |
