= Out of the Dark =

Out of the Dark may refer to:

== Films ==
- Out of the Dark (1989 film), a comedy/horror film starring Karen Witter
- Out of the Dark (1995 film), a comedy/horror film by Jeffery Lau and starring Stephen Chow
- Out in the Dark, a 2012 Israeli romantic drama film by Michael Mayer
- Out of the Dark (2014 film), a thriller film starring Julia Stiles and Scott Speedman
- Ut av mørket (English: Out of the Dark), a 1958 Norwegian film directed by Arild Brinchmann

== Novels ==
- Out of the Dark (Curtiss novel), a 1964 novel by Ursula Curtiss
- Out of the Dark (Wilton Katz novel), a 1995 novel by Welwyn Wilton Katz
- Out of the Dark (Weber novel), a 2010 novel by David Weber

== Music ==
- "Coming Out of the Dark", a 1991 single by Gloria Estefan
- Out of the Dark (O.G. Funk album), a 1993 album by "Billy Bass" Nelson
- Nuclear Blast All-Stars: Out of the Dark, a 2007 compilation album by Nuclear Blast Records
- Out of the Dark (Into the Light), a 1998 album by Falco
  - "Out of the Dark" (song), a song by Falco from his 1998 album Out of the Dark (Into the Light)
- "Out of the Dark... Into the Light", a 1988 EP by Kreator
- Out of the Dark, the 2017 album by Mandisa
- Out Of The Dark, a 2023 album by Wig Wam
  - "Out of the Dark", a song by Wig Wam from their 2023 album Out Of The Dark

== See also ==
- Out of the Darkness (disambiguation)
- Out from the Dark, a 1996 album by Mayhem
