= Christine =

Christine may refer to:

== People ==
- Christine (name), a female given name

== Film ==
- Christine (1958 film), based on Schnitzler's play Liebelei
- Christine (1983 film), based on Stephen King's novel of the same name
- Christine (1987 film), a British television film by Alan Clarke and Arthur Ellis in the anthology series ScreenPlay
- Christine (2016 film), about TV reporter Christine Chubbuck

== Music ==
=== Albums ===
- Christine (soundtrack), from the 1983 film
- Christine (Christine Guldbrandsen album), 2007

=== Songs ===
- "Christine" (Christine and the Queens song), 2014
- "Christine" (Siouxsie and the Banshees song), 1980
- "Christine", by Billy Woods from Aethiopes, 2022
- "Christine", by the House of Love from The House of Love, 1988
- "Christine", by Luscious Jackson from Electric Honey, 1999
- "Christine", by Morris Albert, a B-side of "Feelings", 1974
- "Christine", by Motörhead from Kiss of Death, 2006
- "Christine", by Orchestral Manoeuvres in the Dark from Liberator, 1993

== Other media ==
- Christine (Cholmondeley novel), 1917, by Elizabeth von Arnim under the pen name Alice Cholmondeley
- Christine (King novel), 1983, by Stephen King
- Christine (musical), 1960

== Places ==
=== United States ===
- Christine, California
- Christine, Kentucky
- Christine, North Dakota
- Christine, Texas

== Other uses ==
- SS Christine, a German coastal tanker

== See also ==
- Christene, a given name
- Christinea, a Latin name of Kristinestad
