= Bless the Night =

Single by Wig Wam

from the album Hard to Be a Rock'n Roller
- A-side: "Bless the Night"
- B-side: "Dschingshis Khan"
- Released: 8 August 2005
- Genre: Glam metal, hard rock
- Length: 3:01
- Label: Voices of Wonder
- Songwriter(s): Trond Holter, Åge Sten Nilsen

Wig Wam singles chronology
"In My Dreams" (2005)	"Bless the Night" (2005)	"Gonna Get You Someday" (2006)

"Bless the Night" is the fourth single by Norwegian glam metal band Wig Wam, and the third single from Hard to Be a Rock'n Roller, a renamed reissue of their debut album 667.. The Neighbour of the Beast. The CD single features the title track and a live performance of the cover song "Dschingshis Khan" by the band of same name. "Dschingshis Khan" was later included as one of three bonus tracks for the Japanese reissue of the album, Hard to Be a Rock'n Roller.. In Tokyo!

== Track listing ==
No.	Title	Length
1.	"Bless the Night"
2.	"Dschingshis Khan" (live; Dschinghis Khan cover)

== Charts ==
Chart (2005)	Peak position
Norway (VG-lista)	11
