= Cyberlove =

Cyberlove could mean:

- "Cyberlove", a song from the 1998 Falco album Out of the Dark (Into the Light)
- Internet romance
