= Out of the Dark (song) =

1998 single by Falco

Single by Falco

from the album Out of the Dark (Into the Light)
- B-side: "Der Kommissar 2000"
- Released: 20 March 1998
- Length: 3:36
- Label: EMI Electrola
- Songwriter(s): Falco; Torsten Börger
- Producer(s): Torsten Börger

Falco singles chronology
| "Naked" (1996) | "Out of the Dark" (1998) | "Egoist" (1998) |

"Out of the Dark" is a song by Austrian singer Falco from his eighth studio album Out of the Dark (Into the Light). The song was also released as a single. Both the album and the single were released posthumously in 1998. The song was written by Falco and Torsten Börger and was produced by Börger. The song reached number two in Germany and Austria and number three in Switzerland.

== Track listings ==
CD maxi single – EMI Electrola 8 85456 2 (EMI) (1998, Netherlands)

1. "Out of the Dark" – 3:36
2. "Der Kommissar 2000" – 3:47

CD single – EMI Electrola 8853992

1. "Out of the Dark" – 3:34
2. "Out of the Dark" (instrumental) – 3:34

== Charts ==
=== Weekly charts ===
| Chart (1998) | Peak position |
|---|---|
| Austria (Ö3 Austria Top 40) | 2 |
| Europe (Eurochart Hot 100) | 8 |
| Germany (GfK) | 2 |
| Switzerland (Schweizer Hitparade) | 3 |

=== Year-end charts ===
| Chart (1998) | Position |
|---|---|
| Europe (Eurochart Hot 100) | 48 |
| Germany (Media Control) | 4 |

== Cover versions ==
- In 2002, Sunterra presented their version on their album Lost Time.
- In 2003, Terminal Choice covered the song on his album Menschenbrecher.
- In 2004, Stahlhammer released the song on their album Stahlmania.
- In 2006, [Die!] released the song on their album Stigmata.
- In 2010, Škwor recorded a Czech version under the name “Stíny a mráz” (lit. “Shadows and freeze”) and released it on their 2011 album Drsnej kraj.
- In 2013, Ost+Front released the song on their single "Bitte schlag mich".
- In 2014, Axel One released a metal cover of the song featuring Paul Bartzsch from We Butter the Bread with Butter.
- In 2020, Eisbrecher released the song on their album Schicksalsmelodien.
