= Christine Guldbrandsen =

Norwegian singer

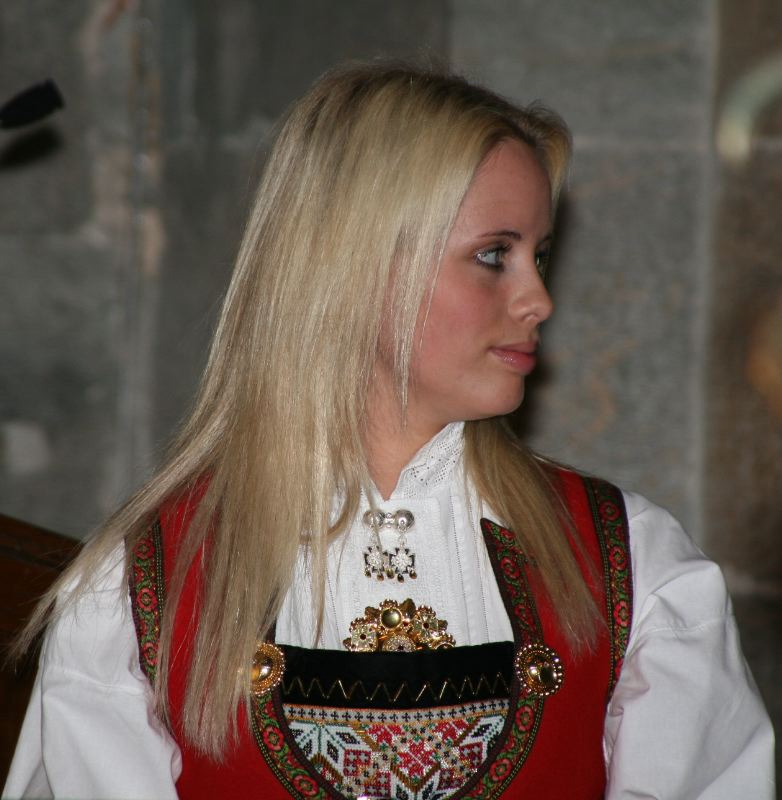

Background information
- Born: Christine Guldbrandsen; 19 March 1985 (age 40); Bergen, Norway
- Genres: Folk, pop, crossover
- Occupations: Singer, actress, songwriter, co-producer
- Instruments: Vocals, fiddle, violin, piano
- Years active: 1998–present
- Labels: Sony BMG
- Website: Christine.bz

Christine Guldbrandsen (born 19 March 1985 in Bergen, Norway) is a singer who is best known internationally for being the Norwegian entrant in the 2006 Eurovision Song Contest. She has released three albums in Scandinavia: Surfing in the Air, Moments, and Christine. A new album, Colors, was released on 8 April 2011. She sings mainly in Norwegian, Danish and English.

== Biography ==
=== Early life ===
Guldbrandsen began singing in the local church choir at age three; at age 13 she was discovered by Kjetil Fluge. At 15 in 2000, she sang "Kulturbyåpningen" in Bergen; in the audience was Sony Music Entertainment, who gave Guldbrandsen her first record deal after the performance. The contract was a result of long-dedicated time and work with Kjetil Fluge, Atle Halstensen, and Erlend Fauske in the Bergen studio Sounds Familiar. In 2001, 16-year-old Guldbrandsen wrote her first song, "Fly Away," a tribute to her father who had just died.

=== 2003 ===
Guldbrandsen's debut album, Surfing in the Air, became a success in Norway and was subsequently released in Finland. The album sold 30,000 copies and she received a Gold record. The song "Surfing in the Air" became a radio hit supported by a music video. After this release she received the Karoline-Prisen, an award given to a young artist who combines school with a musical career. Other songs from her debut album included "The Far End", which entered the Norsktoppen top 40 at number 22, and "Fly Away", which entered the International Songwriting Competition (ISC) and finished in the semi-final with 350 other songs out of 11,000 songs from the world over.

In January 2004, Guldbrandsen and her team started working on her second album; Moments was released that December. It entered the official Norwegian album chart VG-lista Topp 40; the song "Because of You" entered the Norsktoppen Top 40 at Number 26.

=== 2006 ===
In 2006 Guldbrandsen represented her country at the 2006 Eurovision Song Contest in Athens, Greece after winning the Melodi Grand Prix 2006. The Norwegian selection was a Nordic folk song, "Alvedansen" (The dance of elves) - the only one of 18 entries with Norwegian lyrics. Thea Tunås Bratteng accompanied her on stage, playing the typical Norwegian fiddle instrument hardingfele. Guldbrandsen was placed 14th of 24 finalists.

She also sang in the Norwegian Melodi Grand Prix 2007 in Oslo Spektrum with a medley of Dansekjolen (5th place on the Norwegian Radio Stations chart) and the new version of Alvedansen. The special thing about this performance was that Guldbrandsen came flying onto the stage and had six dancers on stage with her.

On 9 January 2008, Guldbrandsen's hit "Alvedansen" was finally released in an English version, "Elf Dance", translated by Andrew Boyle.

=== 2007 ===
On 5 February 2007, she released her third studio album, simply entitled Christine, her most personal album and the first she co-produced. She co-wrote all 10 of the songs except for one traditional Norwegian folk tune; a new, improved version of "Alvedansen" was also included. The songs' styles ranged from low-key ballads with choir and piano to richly coloured soundscapes. The Norwegian media responded well to this released; most magazines gave it four- and even five-star ratings.

=== 2008 ===
In September 2008, Guldbrandsen portrayed Cosette in Les Miserables in 100 performances in Bergen, Norway. 35.000 tickets were sold before the premiere. Only three weeks after the opening night, this musical experienced a huge success. All tickets for the musical were sold out, and Guldbrandsen and the rest of the ensemble also performed on New Year's Eve. Now more than 42000 people have seen Les Misérables on Den Nationale Scene (The National Scene) in Bergen. The reviews were extremely positive and the newspapers gave the musical good reviews (6/6 in BA, 5/6 in VG and 5/6 in Dagbladet). This musical was Guldbrandsen's first acting performance.

Guldbrandsen also joined the Icelandic company NAVIA. The song "We Can Fly" is a project from Navia and is sung by Guldbrandsen (Norway), Jippu (Finland), Julie Berthelsen (Denmark), Lisa Werlinder (Sweden), Disella Làrusdòttir (Iceland), and the African singer Youssou N'Dour. They are sent out on a mission to make a difference through the power of music. Representing different music genres, they perform individually and together within the NAVIA project. They share a dedication to making a difference, in the NAVIA spirit that has created a bond of friendship between them.

On 27 December 2008, Guldbrandsen performed at a concert called Tribute to Madonna, dedicated to one of the world's biggest stars, Madonna. Guldbrandsen teamed up with other popular artists like Elisabeth Moberg, Tine Taule and Torhild Sivertsen.

=== 2009 ===
In May, Guldbrandsen took part in Mostraspelet on Bømlo (located on the west coast of Norway). She had the leading female role as Vigdis. The leading male role was played by the actor and singer Sigurd Sele. Mostraspelet is a yearly event which shows some Norwegian history. 100 actors and an orchestra of 40 musicians helped Guldbrandsen in the role as Vigdis. She also shared the venue with Alexander Rybak, the 2009 Eurovision Song Contest winner from Norway.

Guldbrandsen sang as a guest artist on Håvard Lothe's Dorian Gray on the pop ballad "When We Fly." The album was released on 31 August in stores and for download.

On 18 October 2009, Guldbrandsen first performed with the Norwegian group Nightingales. This is a project she initiated with three other well-known young singers in Norway: Karianne Kjærnes, Helene Bøksle, and Heidi Ruud Ellingsen. The concert took place in Hareid Municipality (near the city of Ålesund) on the northwestern part of Norway.

Guldbrandsen toured southwestern Norway on 4–12 December 2009; she and Sigurd Sele performed some of the best-known Christmas carols as well as lesser-known material. The concerts happened in five different churches in Norway with musicians including Vidar Eldholm (piano), Thomas Dahl (guitars), and Kjetil Fluge (bass) and 2009 Eurovision winner 2009 Alexander Rybak.

In December, Guldbrandsen returned from her trip to Afghanistan, where she performed for the Norwegian, German, Swedish and American soldiers stationed in the northern part of the country. She performed with musicians from the Norwegian forces (Forsvarets Musikkorps Vestlandet).

=== 2010 ===
Guldbrandsen performed at various gatherings initiated by Den Norske Sjomannskirken. She mainly performed in Millennium Place, situated in the Olympic city Whistler under the Vancouver/Olympic Winter Games of 2010.

From September 2010 to January 2011, Guldbrandsen played Maria in Norway's The Sound of Music. Espen Hana played the male role, George von Trapp.

Guldbrandsen was featured as one of many artists on the album Bergensbølgene - Et Dykk I Bergens Pop- og Rockhistorie where she sings the song "Telefonen" by the famous Norwegian singer/songwriter Jan Eggum. Several of Bergen's most distinguished artists participated in the album.

In December 2010, Guldbrandsen held several Christmas concerts with the tenor Mads Belden and Sigurd Sele.

=== 2011 ===
Gulbrandsen released the album Color in April 2011. The ten songs on the album were composed and had lyrics by several people, including Gulbrandsen, Kjetil Fluge, Hans Petter Aaserud and Eivind Buene.

== Albums, singles and charts ==
=== Albums ===
Year	Information	Chart positions				Sales/certification
Year	Information	NO	SE	DK	FI	Sales/certification
2003	Surfing in the Air: First studio album; Released: 19 November 2003	15	—	—	32	Sales: 30.000; Certification: Gold
2004	Moments: Second studio album; Released: 20 December 2004	32	—	—	—	Sales: ?; Certification: ?
2007	Christine: Third studio album; Released: 5 February 2007	20	—	—	—	Sales: ?; Certification: ?
2011	Colors: Fourth studio album; Released: 8 April 2011	—	—	—	—	Sales: ?; Certification: ?

=== Singles ===
Year	Title	Chart positions			Album
Year	Title	NO	SE	DK	Album
2004	"Surfing in the Air"	3	—	—	Surfing in the Air
2004	"The Far End"	22	—	—	Surfing in the Air
2005	"Because of You"	26	—	—	Moments
2006	"Alvedansen"	1	—	49	Norsk Melodi Grand Prix 2006, Eurovision Song Contest 2006
2007	"Dansekjolen"	5	—	—	Christine
2008	"Elf Dance"	—	—	—	—
2011	"Break My Chains"	—	—	—	Colors

== See also ==
- Melodi Grand Prix 2006
- Eurovision Song Contest 2006

Awards and achievements
Preceded by Wig Wam with "In My Dreams"	Norway in the Eurovision Song Contest; 2006	Succeeded by Guri Schanke with "Ven a bailar conmigo"
