= Wolf & Butterfly =

Studio album by Åge Sten Nilsen
- Released: December 11, 2006
- Genre: Pop, pop rock, rock
- Label: Musikkoperatørene

Åge Sten Nilsen chronology
G-Sten (2000)	Wolf & Butterfly (2006)	GLAMunition (2009)

Wolf & Butterfly is the second album by the Norwegian modern musician Åge Sten Nilsen. The album was originally released under his stagename "G-Sten" making the album also a self-titled debut album. It's the first album by Åge to be released under his whole name, Åge Sten Nilsen. On June 24, 2009, the album and GLAMunition was released in Japan through King Records.

== Track listing ==
No.	Title	Length
1.	"Don't Feed The Broken Hearted*"
2.	"What Elvis Couldn't By"
3.	"My True Colors"
4.	"Bright Lights On"
5.	"Television Star"
6.	"Rebecca"
7.	"Wolf & Butterfly"
8.	"Suburban Sky"
9.	"Will You Be There"
10.	"Moons Ray"
11.	"What Elvis Couldn't By (Alternative version)*"

Note

- * track that didn't appear on the original issue.
- On the original issue, also a track entitteled "Supernutcase Everafter" was included.

== Background ==
Wolf & Butterfly is actually a re-recorded version of his debut album G-Sten. The album was re-recorded and featured two new additional tracks and different artwork. It is often referred to as his debut album since he didn't have much success with the debut and is not as well known as the reissue.
