= GLAMunition =

Studio album by Åge Sten Nilsen
- Released: February 9, 2009
- Recorded: Studio 89, Oslo
- Genre: Pop, pop rock, rock
- Label: Universal
- Producer: Åge Sten Nilsen & Christian Ingebrigtsen

Åge Sten Nilsen chronology
Wolf & Butterfly (2006)	GLAMunition (2009)

Singles from GLAMunition
- 1. "No Cigar" Released: 2009

Professional ratings
Review scores
Source	Rating
Metal Invader	5/6 stars

GLAMunition is the third album by the Norwegian modern musician Åge Sten Nilsen. It is his first album in nine years to feature all-new material and his first to spawn a physical single. The album was released under his birth name Åge Sten Nilsen, but the album title GLAMunition features GLAM in it, which is his stagename when he's playing with his glam metal band Wig Wam. On June 27 the album and Wolf & Butterfly was released in Japan through King Records.

== Track listing ==
No.	Title	Length
1.	"Not Gonna Stop 'till I Get It"
2.	"No Cigar"
3.	"Bring The Night On"
4.	"Vainette"
5.	"Brave"
6.	"Were The Good Times Grow"
7.	"Touch Of The Untouchable"
8.	"Count On Me (feat. Kee Marcello & Ragnhild Heiland Sørensen)"
9.	"Two Friends And A Bottle Of Wine (feat. ELG & Ronnie Tekro)"
10.	"Don't"
11.	"Unconditional Love"
