= Mutter, der Mann mit dem Koks ist da =

1996 single by Falco

Single by T»MA a.k.a. Falco

from the album Out of the Dark (Into the Light)
- Released: 1 March 1996
- Label: Sing Sing; BMG Berlin Musik GmbH
- Songwriter(s): Peter Hoffmann; Edgar Höfler; Franz Plasa; White Duke

T»MA a.k.a. Falco singles chronology
"Dance Mephisto" (1992)	"Mutter, der Mann mit dem Koks ist da" (1996)	"Naked" (1996)

"Mutter, der Mann mit dem Koks ist da" is a song by T»MA a.k.a. Falco. It was originally released as a single in early 1996.

The song was later included on Falco's 1998 album Out of the Dark (Into the Light) (released posthumously).

== Background and writing ==
The song is credited to Peter Hoffmann, Franz Plasa, White Duke, and Edgar Höfler. It is based a late 19th century song of the same name about a street vendor, only in Falco's version the vendor is a drug dealer who sells cocaine.

== Commercial performance ==
The song reached number 3 in Austria and number 11 in Germany.

== Track listing ==
CD-maxi – Sing Sing 74321 31859 2 (BMG) (1996)

1. "Mutter, der Mann mit dem Koks ist da" (video mix) – 3:40
2. "Mutter, der Mann mit dem Koks ist da" (Mother's Favourite) – 5:45
3. "Mutter, der Mann mit dem Koks ist da" (Long Line mix) – 6:17
4. "Mutter, der Mann mit dem Koks ist da" (Cinerama mix) – 5:50
5. "Mutter, der Mann mit dem Koks ist da" (TB Line mix [club mix]) – 6:13

== Charts ==
Chart (1996)	Peak position
Austria (Ö3 Austria Top 40)	3
Germany (GfK)	11
Switzerland (Schweizer Hitparade)	30

== Cover versions ==
The song has been covered by German metal bands Stahlhammer and Eisregen.
