= Naked (Falco song) =

Single by Falco

from the album Out of the Dark (Into the Light)
- Released: 11 August 1996
- Label: Sing Sing; Spin; EMI Electrola GmbH
- Songwriter(s): White Duke; Voye
- Producer(s): Torsten Börger

Falco singles chronology
"Mutter, der Mann mit dem Koks ist da" (1996)	"Naked" (1996)	"Out of the Dark" (1998)

"Naked" is a song by Falco feat. T»MB. It was originally released in 1996 as a single.

Later the song was included on Falco's 1998 studio album Out of the Dark (Into the Light) (released posthumously).

== Background and writing ==
The song was written by White Duke and Voye. The recording was produced by Torsten Börger.

== Commercial performance ==
The song reached number 4 in Austria and number 50 in Germany.

== Track listings ==
CD maxi single – Spin 8622462 (EMI) (1996)

1. "Naked" (original mix) – 3:49
2. "Naked" (Sweetbox short mix) – 3:05
3. "Naked" (Full Frontal mix) – 6:02
4. "Naked" (Sweetbox Filter mix) – 6:48
5. "Naked" (Sweetbox club mix) – 6:13

12" vinyl maxi single – 8622926 (EMI) (remixes, Germany, 1996)

A. "Naked" (Beam's Devil Dance) – 6:52
B1. "Naked" (D-Syndroma house mix) – 5:27
B2. "Naked (D-Syndroma Night mix) – 5:58

== Charts ==
Chart performance for "Naked"
Chart (1996)	Peak position
Austria (Ö3 Austria Top 40)	4
Germany (GfK)	50
