= Opera Noir =

Studio album by Stahlhammer
- Released: 31 March 2006
- Genre: Neue Deutsche Härte
- Length: 44:25
- Label: Def-Dick

Stahlhammer chronology
| Stahlmania (2004) | Opera Noir (2006) |

Professional ratings
Review scores
| Source | Rating |
|---|---|
| Rock Hard | 4/10 |

Opera Noir is the sixth studio album by Austrian heavy metal band Stahlhammer, released on 3 March 2006. The album follows the "Stahlhammer tradition" with cover songs of David Bowie's "Heroes/Helden" and Phil Collins's "In the Air Tonight".

== Track listing ==
1. Vienna – 4:41
2. Wie es ist (How it is) – 2:58
3. Opera Noir (Black opera) – 4:23
4. Kalt wie Eis (Cold as ice) – 4:18
5. In the Air Tonight – 5:10 (Phil Collins cover)
6. Tod a capella (Death a capella) – 4:29
7. Das schreiende Herz (The screaming heart) – 3:45
8. La Paloma (The Dove) – 3:56 (Hans Albers cover)
9. Krieger morden nicht (Warriors don't murder) – 3:12
10. Jazz – 3:23
11. Mensch (Human) – 2:30
12. Der alte Mann (The old man) – 3:40
13. Heroes/Helden – 5:39 (David Bowie cover)
