= Stahlmania =

Studio album by Stahlhammer
- Released: 20 September 2004
- Genre: Neue Deutsche Härte
- Length: 54:18
- Label: Goodsongs

Stahlhammer chronology
Eisenherz (2002)	Stahlmania (2004)	Opera Noir (2006)

Professional ratings
Review scores
Source	Rating
Rock Hard	4/10

Stahlmania is the fifth studio album by Austrian heavy metal band Stahlhammer, released on 20 September 2004. The album was signed to record label Goodsongs and was distributed by Sony Germany. Stahlmania features a cover of the famous Falco song "Out of the Dark", a remake of the Udo Jürgens classic "Merci, Chérie", and their own original songs.

== Track listing ==
1. "Keine Tränen sehen" (See no tears) – 2:51
2. "Stahlmania" (Steelmania) – 3:12
3. "Out of the Dark" – 4:24 (Falco cover)
4. "Dein Held sein" (To be your hero) – 3:08
5. "Das Salz auf deiner Haut" (The salt on your skin) – 3:18
6. "Compact" – 3:22
7. "Das unentdeckte Land" (The uncharted land) – 4:03
8. "Der ewige Augenblick" (The eternal moment) – 3:17
9. "Angst" (Fear) – 2:55
10. "Der zerbrochene Traum" (The broken dream) – 4:55
11. "Lady Josephine" – 3:14
12. "Habe dich geliebt" (I loved you) – 4:09
13. "Ich (Feel Me)" (I (Feel me)) – 5:12
14. "Verdammt, sie hasst mich" (Damn, she hates me) – 3:55
15. "Merci, Chérie" – 2:15 (Udo Jürgens cover)
