= Never Say Die (Wig Wam album) =

Studio album by Wig Wam
- Released: January 22, 2021
- Studio: Holter Studio, Stargate Studios
- Genre: Glam metal, hard rock
- Length: 47:09
- Label: Frontiers Music
- Producer: Trond Holter

Wig Wam chronology
Wall Street (2012)	Never Say Die (2021)	Out of the Dark (2023)

Singles from Never Say Die
- 1. "Never Say Die" Released: 27 October 2020; 2. "Kilimanjaro" Released: 2 December 2020

Never Say Die is the fifth studio album by Norwegian glam metal band Wig Wam, released on 22 January 2021. It is the band's first album in nine years and their first following their reunion in 2019 after initially splitting up in 2014. The album was produced by the band's guitarist Trond Holter and recorded at Holter Studio and Stargate Studios.

== Release and promotion ==
The band released "Never Say Die" And "Kilimanjaro" as singles ahead of the album's release, and performed a live-streamed concert at a release event for the album at Chateau Neuf on January 22, 2021. Restrictions due to the COVID-19 pandemic made it difficult to promote the album with media appearances and live shows, with the band only performing a few concerts that year and being dropped by their booking agency in January 2022.

After "Do Ya Wanna Taste It" from the Non Stop Rock'n Roll album was used as the theme song for the HBO Max television series Peacemaker, the band experienced a resurgence in popularity and appeared at festivals in Norway and Europe once the COVID restrictions had been lifted later in 2022. A summer tour of the United States was planned, but delayed to 2023 after difficulties with acquiring work visas.

== Track listing ==
No.	Title	Lyrics	Music	Length
1.	"The Second Crusade"			0:54
2.	"Never Say Die"	Trond Holter	Holter	4:02
3.	"Hypnotized"	Åge Sten Nilsen	Holter; Nilsen	3:54
4.	"Shadows Of Eternity"	Holter	Holter	3:32
5.	"Kilimanjaro"	Nilsen	Nilsen	3:53
6.	"Where Does It Hurt"	Bernt Jansen	Jansen	4:14
7.	"My Kaleidoscope Ark"	Nilsen	Nilsen	4:32
8.	"Dirty Little Secret"	Nilsen	Holter; Nilsen	3:48
9.	"Call Of The Wild"	Jansen	Jansen; Holter	4:40
10.	"Northbound"			3:51
11.	"Hard Love"	Nilsen	Nilsen	3:33
12.	"Silver Lining"	Jansen	Jansen	6:16
Total length:				47:09

== Personnel ==
Wig Wam

- Glam (Åge Sten Nilsen) – lead vocals, backing vocals
- Teeny (Trond Holter) – guitar, keyboards, backing vocals, production, programming, mixing, mastering
- Flash (Bernt Jansen) – bass, backing vocals, lead vocals (9)
- Sporty (Øystein Greaker-Andersen) – drums

Additional personnel

- Lasse Finbråten – keyboards, programming
- Hallgeir Rustan – engineering (5, 8)
- Haakon Nilo Holter – backing vocals (2)
- Ingeborg Nilo Holter – backing vocals (2)
- Solveig Holter – backing vocals (2)
- Vilde Trondsdatter Holter – backing vocals (2)
- Anders Fästader – layout
- Fredrik Arff – photography
