= Nachtflug =

1992 album by Falco

Studio album by Falco
- Released: 4 October 1992
- Recorded: 1991–1992
- Genres: Pop rock; dance; pop rap
- Length: 38:09
- Label: EMI Electrola
- Producer: Bolland & Bolland

Falco chronology
Data de Groove (1990)	Nachtflug (1992)	Out of the Dark (Into the Light) (1998)

Singles from Nachtflug
- 1. "Nachtflug" Released: 1992 (Netherlands only); 2. "Titanic" Released: 5 July 1992; 3. "Dance Mephisto" Released: 8 November 1992

Nachtflug is the seventh studio album by Austrian singer Falco. It was Falco's last album to be released in his lifetime.

In Germany, Nachtflug marked the return of Falco to the album and single charts after four years of absence, during which his only charted singles were seen in his home country of Austria. The single "Titanic" almost reached the top 25 of the Slovak "Okeychart".

Falco saw success with the single "Titanic" in Austria, peaking at number 3 and staying on the charts for 18 weeks. The album itself profited from this success and Falco reached number 1 on the Austrian albums chart again, a feat which his previous two full-length albums had failed to achieve. Despite being a hit in Europe, it failed to chart in the United States.

Another single, "Dance Mephisto", also made it to the Austrian charts but only saw minor success. The title track, also a single, failed to chart.

== Track listing ==
1. "Titanic" – 3:35
2. "Monarchy Now" – 4:12
3. "Dance Mephisto" – 3:31
4. "Psychos" – 3:16
5. "S.C.A.N.D.A.L." – 3:56
6. "Yah-Vibration" – 3:33
7. "Propaganda" – 3:36
8. "Time" – 4:07
9. "Cadillac Hotel" – 5:07
10. "Nachtflug" – 3:15

=== 2012 remaster bonus disc ===
1. "Dance Mephisto" (Dance Mix) – 3:32
2. "Dance Mephisto" (Instrumental Radio Mix) – 3:27
3. "Titanic" (The English Video Version) – 3:41
4. "Titanic" (Club Mix – Another Mixz Mix) – 6:29
5. "Titanic" (TV-Mix) – 4:21
6. "Titanic" (Deep Tekno Tranz Mix) – 6:53
7. "Titanic" (Dance Till You Drop Techno – 127BPM) – 12:32
8. "Titanic" (House Vocal) – 5:45
9. "Titanic" (Funky Ragga) – 6:06
10. "Titanic" (Deep Tekno Tranz Edit) – 4:28
11. "Titanic" (Original Remix) – 4:20
12. "Monarchy Now" (Extended Club Mix) – 5:37
13. "Monarchy Now" (Beat 4 Feet Radio Mix) – 3:53
14. "Monarchy Now" (Schönbrunner Flieder Club Mix) – 5:38

== Charts ==
Chart performance for Nachtflug
Chart (1992)	Peak position
Austrian Albums (Ö3 Austria)	1
German Albums (Offizielle Top 100)	73

== Certifications ==
Certifications for Nachtflug
Region	Certification	Certified units/sales
Austria (IFPI Austria)	Gold	25,000^{*}
^{*} Sales figures based on certification alone.
