= Live in Tokyo (Wig Wam album) =

Live album by Wig Wam
- Released: 11 June 2007
- Recorded: February 26 2007
- Venue: Shibuya O-East
- Genre: Glam metal, hard rock
- Length: 68:39
- Label: Voices of Wonder (Europe); King Records (Japan)
- Producer: Trond Holter

Wig Wam chronology
Wig Wamania (2006)	Live in Tokyo (2007)	Non Stop Rock'n Roll (2010)

Live in Tokyo is the Norwegian glam metal band Wig Wam's first live album. The album was recorded on 26 February, 2007, at Shibuya O-East in Tokyo, and released later that year on 11 June. A live video album of the show, Made in Japan, was released on the same date.

The European edition of the album included two bonus songs, "After the Nine O'Clock News" and "Flying High", previously released on the Japanese edition of Wig Wamania. The Japanese version of Live in Tokyo included a bonus disc with four additional songs: an acoustic version of "Bygone Zone", "Crazy Things" live at Shibuya O-East, and "Slave To Your Love" and "After The Nine O'Clock News" performed at soundcheck.

== Background and recording ==
In 2006, Wig Wam signed with King Records for the release of their albums in Japan. Following the record deal, the band toured the country in February and March 2007 as part of their Wig Wamania tour in support of their second studio album, with Swedish hard rock band Fatal Smile as the opening act. Live in Tokyo was recorded at Shibuya O-East in Tokyo on 26 February, 2007. The concert was the first show of the Japanese leg of the tour and had been sold out weeks prior to the performance. Japanese music journalist Masanori Ito, who had previously picked Hard To Be A Rock'n Roller as album of the month on his radio show, introduced the band on stage. In addition to being recorded, the show was also filmed for a video album titled Made in Japan. Before the tour and by the release of the live albums, the band had sold 30,000 and 60,000 records respectively in the country. Wig Wam returned to Japan later in 2007 for festival appearances in October.

== Track listing ==
All lyrics are written by Åge Sten Nilsen, except where noted; all music is composed by Trond Holter, except where noted

No.	Title	Lyrics	Music	Length
1.	"Introduction By Masa Itho"			0:48
2.	"Wig Wamania"			0:57
3.	"Rock My Ride"	Holter		4:07
4.	"Daredevil Heat"		Wig Wam	4:21
5.	"Bless The Night"		Holter; Nilsen	5:13
6.	"Gonna Get You Someday"	Holter		3:32
7.	"Out Of Time"	Holter		4:41
8.	"Erection"			1:47
9.	"The Riddle"			3:28
10.	"At The End Of The Day"	Holter		5:06
11.	"Mine All Mine"	Holter		2:41
12.	"A R'n R Girl Like You"		Nilsen	2:50
13.	"Breaking All The Rules"		Jansen	4:00
14.	"Kill My Rock'n Roll"		Holter; Nilsen	3:44
15.	"Hard To Be A Rock'n Roller"			9:39
16.	"No More Living On Lies"	Holter		3:54
17.	"In My Dreams"	Holter		7:51
Total length:				68:39

European edition bonus tracks

No.	Title	Lyrics	Music	Length
18.	"Flying High"	Jansen	Jansen	3:19
19.	"After The Nine O'Clock News"	Nilsen	Nilsen	3:33
Total length:				75:31

Japanese edition disc two

No.	Title	Length
1.	"Bygone Zone" (Acoustic)
2.	"Crazy Things" (Live At Shibuya O-East)
3.	"Slave To Your Love" (Soundcheck version)
4.	"After The Nine O'Clock News" (Soundcheck version)

== Personnel ==
Wig Wam

- Glam (Åge Sten Nilsen) – lead vocals, cover art design
- Teeny (Trond Holter) – guitar, keyboards, backing vocals, production, engineering
- Flash (Bernt Jansen) – bass, backing vocals, lead vocals (18)
- Sporty (Øystein Andersen) – drums

Additional personnel

- Eivind Skovdahl – mixing
- Ola Johansen – mastering
- Kennek Knock – recording engineer
- Masako Matsuda – recording engineer
- Trygve Sørli – cover art
- Yuki Kuroyanagi – photography
- Grant V. Faint – photography
