= Titanic (Falco song) =

Single by Falco

from the album Nachtflug
- Released: 1992
- Label: EMI Electrola GmbH
- Composers: Rob Bolland; Ferdi Bolland
- Lyricist: Falco

Falco singles chronology
"Charisma Commando" (1990)	"Titanic" (1992)	"Dance Mephisto" (1992)

"Titanic" is a song by Falco from his 1992 studio album Nachtflug. It was released as a lead single from the album.

== Background and writing ==
The song is written by Rob and Ferdi Bolland (music) and Falco (lyrics).

The recording was produced by Rob and Ferdi Bolland. The music video features Falco as captain of the RMS Titanic.

== Commercial performance ==
The song reached no. 3 in Austria and no. 47 in Germany.

== Track listings ==
7" single Electrola 86 2010 7 (1992, Germany)

A. "Titanic" (Radio Version) (3:37)
B. "Titanic" (Original Remix) (4:20)

CD maxi single Electrola 620 102 7 (1992)

1. "Titanic" (Radio Version) (3:37)
2. "Titanic" (Club Mix) (6:34)

12" Maxi Electrola 62010 6 5 (1992)

1. "Titanic" (Club Mix) (6:34)
2. "Titanic" (Deep Tekno Tranz Mix) (6:52)
3. "Titanic" (Original Remix) (4:20)
4. "Titanic" (Deep Tekno Tranz Edit) (4:28)

== Charts ==
Chart (1992)	Peak position
Austria (Ö3 Austria Top 40)	3
Germany (GfK)	47
