= Dance Mephisto =

Single by Falco

from the album Nachtflug
- Released: 1992
- Label: EMI Electrola GmbH
- Composers: Rob Bolland; Ferdi Bolland
- Lyricist: Falco

Falco singles chronology
"Titanic" (1992)	"Dance Mephisto" (1992)	"Mutter, der Mann mit dem Koks ist da" (1996)

"Dance Mephisto" is a song by Falco from his 1992 studio album Nachtflug. It was also released as a single.

== Background and writing ==
The song was written by Rob and Ferdi Bolland (music) and Falco (lyrics).

The recording was produced by Rob and Ferdi Bolland.

== Commercial performance ==
The song reached no. 17 in Austria.

== Track listings ==
7" single Electrola 86 2023 7 (1992, Germany)

A. "Dance Mephisto" (3:28)
B. "Dance Mephisto" (Instrumental Radio Mix) (3:28)

CD single EMI 620 232 1 (1992)

1. "Dance Mephisto" (Radio Mix) (3:28)
2. "Dance Mephisto" (Dance Mix) (3:32)

== Charts ==
Chart (1992)	Peak position
Austria (Ö3 Austria Top 40)	17
