= 667.. The Neighbour of the Beast =

Studio album by Wig Wam
- Released: 8 March 2004
- Recorded: 2004
- Studio: Firehouse Studio, Halden; Hitsville, Halden
- Genre: Glam metal, hard rock
- Length: 45:52
- Label: Global Music
- Producer: Trond Holter, Ole Evenrud

Wig Wam chronology
667.. The Neighbour of the Beast (2004)	Hard to Be a Rock'n Roller (2005)

Singles from Hard to Be a Rock'n Roller
- 1. "I Turn to You" Released: 2004; 2. "Crazy Things" Released: 2004

667.. The Neighbour of the Beast is the debut album by the Norwegian glam metal band Wig Wam. Released in Norway on 8 March 2004, the album was included two singles, the Melanie C cover "I Turn to You" and "Hard to Be a Rock'n Roller", and their Melodi Grand Prix 2004 song "Crazy Things". The album was produced by the band's guitarist Trond Holter and Ole Evenrud.

In January 2005, the album was reissued for a release in Scandinavia and renamed to Hard to Be a Rock'n Roller. The album included a radio-edit of the song "Hard to Be a Rock'n Roller", an instrumental track titled "The Drop", and a re-arranged tracklist. This album was reissued a second time for release in Scandinavia in March 2005, and renamed to Hard to Be a Rock n' Roller.., with the song "In My dreams" and the video for "Hard to Be a Rock n' Roller" being added to the tracklist. The album was further reissued for releases in Europe and Asia titled Hard to Be a Rock'n Roller.. in Kiev! and Hard to Be a Rock'n Roller.. in Tokyo! respectively.

The album title is a reference to the Iron Maiden album The Number of the Beast. The number 667 was later referenced on the cover art of Wig Wam's third album Non Stop Rock'n Roll as the license plate number of the "guitar car."

== Track listing ==
No.	Title	Writer(s)	Length
1.	"667"		0:49
2.	"The Best Song In The World"	Trond Holter; Åge Sten Nilsen	3:10
3.	"Crazy Things"	Holter; Bernt Jansen; Nilsen	3:09
4.	"Out Of Time"	Holter	4:05
5.	"Mine All Mine"	Holter	3:38
6.	"Hard to Be A Rock'n Roller"	Holter; Nilsen	4:35
7.	"Tell Me Where To Go"	Jansen	4:09
8.	"Erection"	Holter	2:09
9.	"I Turn To You"	Melanie Chisholm; Rick Nowels; Billy Steinberg	4:09
10.	"Car-Lyle"	Holter; Jansen; Nilsen	3:53
11.	"Bless The Night"	Holter; Nilsen	3:50
12.	"A Long Way"	Nilsen	4:22
13.	"No More Living On Lies"	Holter	3:54
Total length:			45:52

== Personnel ==
Wig Wam

- Glam (Åge Sten Nilsen) – vocals, artwork
- Teeny (Trond Holter) – guitars, backing vocals, production, mixing
- Flash (Bernt Jansen) – bass, backing vocals
- Sporty (Øystein Andersen) – drums

Additional personnel

- Per Østmark – mastering
- Eric Hawk – backing vocals (3)
- Trude Holter – backing vocals (3)
- Stian Joneid – backing vocals (3)
- Sebastian Ludvigsen – photography
- Thomas Siqueland – mixing (9, 13)
- Ole "Dr. Evil Rude" Evenrude – production (9, 13)
