= Moments (Christine Guldbrandsen album) =

Studio album by Christine Guldbrandsen
- Released: December 20, 2004
- Recorded: 2003–2004
- Genre: Pop, classical
- Length: 39:06 (Norwegian edition)
- Label: Sony BMG Entertainment Norway
- Producer: Kjetil Fluge, Christine Guldbrandsen, Atle Halstensen, Erlend Fauske, Annelise Ringsby Fauske, Andrew Boyle

Christine Guldbrandsen chronology
| Surfing in the Air (2003) | Moments (2004) | Christine (2007) |

Moments is the second album by Norwegian pop singer Christine Guldbrandsen, released in 2004 in Norway and through Sony BMG Entertainment Norway.

== Album information ==
This album was not as well received as Guldbrandsen's debut album, but it still managed to reach the Top 40 albums list in 2004.

== Reviews ==
Professional ratings
Review scores
| Source | Rating |
|---|---|
| Musical Discoveries | 5/5 stars |
| BT | 5/5 stars |

The review of the album on the Musical Discoveries website states "The first thing listeners will notice of the album, especially when comparing it to Surfing In The Air is the more classy recording style. Perhaps to appeal to a broader audience, rock and pop references are not overwhelming, but that's not to say that songs are without guitar or other instrumental solos... Moments is a superb follow-up album!"

== Track listing ==
| # | Title | Composers | Time |
|---|---|---|---|
| 1. | "The Meadow" | Kjetil Fluge, Atle Halstensen, Christine Guldbrandsen | 3:26 |
| 2. | "Alone" | Kjetil Fluge, Erlend Fauske, Christine Guldbrandsen | 3:03 |
| 3. | "Because of You" | Kjetil Fluge, Erlend Fauske, Christine Guldbrandsen | 3:35 |
| 4. | "From a Distance" | Julie Gold, Kjetil Fluge | 4:15 |
| 5. | "Silverlight (Lascia Che Io Pianga)" | Georg Friedrich Händel, Andrew Boyle | 3:38 |
| 6. | "My Angel" | Kjetil Fluge, Christine Guldbrandsen | 3:51 |
| 7. | "Feet On The Ground" | Kjetil Fluge, Atle Halstensen, Christine Guldbrandsen | 3:57 |
| 8. | "Autumn Dawn" | Erlend Fauske, Annelise Ringsby Fauske | 3:33 |
| 9. | "Mist" | Kjetil Fluge, Atle Halstensen, Christine Guldbrandsen | 2:53 |
| 10. | "Between The Lines" | Kjetil Fluge | 4:22 |
| 11. | "Sommernatt Ved Fjorden" (duet with Rein Alexander) | Kjetil Fluge, Atle Halstensen, Christine Guldbrandsen | 4:10 |
