= Surfing in the Air =

Surfing In The Air

Studio album by Christine Guldbrandsen
- Released: November 19, 2003
- Recorded: 2002–2003
- Genre: Pop
- Length: 41:50
- Label: Sony Music Entertainment Norway
- Producer: Kjetil Fluge, Christine Guldbrandsen, Atle Halstensen, Erlend Fauske, Annelise Ringsby Fauske, Andrew Boyle

Christine Guldbrandsen chronology
Surfing In The Air (2003)	Moments (2004)

Surfing In The Air is the debut album by Norwegian pop singer Christine Guldbrandsen, released in 2003 in Norway and Finland through Sony Music Entertainment, Surfing In The Air became a huge success in Norway, selling 30,000 album copies in only 3 weeks and received a Gold Record.

== Album information ==
Surfing In The Air contains 11 tracks, sung in Latin and English. The opening track Surfing In The Air contains lyrics from the song Walking in the Air written by Howard Blake in 1982.

== Reception ==
Professional ratings
Review scores
Source	Rating
Musical Discoveries	5/5 stars
BT	5/5 stars

A review in the website Musical Discoveries states, "The eleven light pop-oriented tracks illustrate the crystalline soprano texture of her voice. Solid rock instrumental arrangements never overwhelm the vocal layers."

== Track listing ==
#	Title	Composers	Time
1.	"Surfing In The Air"	Erlend Fauske, Kjetil Fluge, Atle Halstensen, Howard Blake	3:50
2.	"Invisible Friend"	Kjetil Fluge, Christine Guldbrandsen	3:37
3.	"In Your Embrace"	Erlend Fauske, Annelise Ringsby Fauske	3:42
4.	"Fly Away"	Kjetil Fluge, Christine Guldbrandsen	4:10
5.	"My Secret"	Kjetil Fluge, Christine Guldbrandsen	4:06
6.	"The Search"	Kjetil Fluge, Erlend Fauske, Christine Guldbrandsen	3:10
7.	"The Far End"	Kjetil Fluge, Atle Halstensen, Christine Guldbrandsen	4:11
8.	"The Sign of The Ring"	Andrew Boyle, Atle Halstensen	3:55
9.	"Low"	Erlend Fauske, Annelise Ringsby Fauske	3:01
10.	"The Pretty One"	Erlend Fauske, Annnelise Ringsby Fauske	3:58
11.	"Dreams"	Kjetil Fluge, Atle Halstensen, Christine Guldbrandsen	4:10
