= Egoist (Falco song) =

Single by Falco

from the album Out of the Dark (Into the Light)
- Released: 1998
- Label: EMI Electrola GmbH
- Songwriter(s): Falco; Peter Ehrlich; Steve Van Velvet
- Producer(s): Torsten Börger

Falco singles chronology
"Out of the Dark" (1998)	"Egoist" (1998)	"Push! Push!" (1999)

"Egoist" is a song by Falco from his eighth studio album Out of the Dark (Into the Light). The song was also released as a single. (Both the album and the single were released posthumously in 1998.)

== Background and writing ==
The song was written by Falco, Patrick Alexander Ehrlich, and Steve Van Velvet. The recording was produced by Torsten Börger.

== Commercial performance ==
The song reached number 4 in Germany, number 6 in Austria and number 19 in Switzerland.

== Track listing ==
CD maxi single – EMI Electrola 8 85985 2 (EMI) (1998, Netherlands)

1. "Egoist" (remix) – 3:40
2. "Egoist" (original version) – 3:26
3. "Out of the Dark" (remix) – 3:26

== Charts ==
Chart (1998)	Peak position
Austria (Ö3 Austria Top 40)	6
Germany (GfK)	4
Switzerland (Schweizer Hitparade)	19

=== Year-end charts ===
Chart (1998)	Position
Germany (Official German Charts)	34
