= Christene =

Christene is a feminine given name. Notable people with this name include the following:

- Christene Browne (born 1965), Canadian film writer, producer and director
- Christene Mayer (born 1847, American criminal
- Christene Merick (1916–2008), American philanthropist
- Christene Palmer (born 1930s), Australian singer and actress

== See also ==
- Christen (disambiguation)
- Christene Volkspartij
- Christine (disambiguation)
