= Feind hört mit =

Studio album by Stahlhammer
- Released: 27 April 1999
- Genres: Neue Deutsche Härte, industrial metal
- Length: 44:47
- Label: Nuclear Blast

Stahlhammer chronology
Wiener Blut (1997)	Feind hört mit (1999)	Eisenherz (2002)

Feind hört mit ("[The] enemy listens in") is an album by Austrian heavy metal band Stahlhammer. It was released on 27 April 1999. The album's text is largely written in a font of Cyrillic letters, though the words are German. The limited edition was limited to only 2,000 copies each with a number on the back.

The text at the bottom of the album cover reads "Goldenes Zepter nur ein Stock in des Königs Hand. Wer nicht wagt der darf nicht hoffen auf ein schöner Land". Roughly translated, this means "A golden scepter is only a stick in the hand of a king. Who dares not, shouldn't hope for a beautiful country".

== Track listing ==
1. "Was ist das" (What is that) – 1:01
2. "Am liebsten von hinten" (Preferably from behind) – 3:36
3. "Feind hört mit" (Enemy listens) – 5:46
4. "Der Mann mit dem Koks" (The man with the coke) – 5:02 (Falco cover)
5. "Herz aus Stahl" (Heart of steel) – 3:44
6. "Schlag mich" (Hit me) – 4:28
7. "Messerschmied" (Knifesmith) – 6:18
8. "Jeanny" – 5:33 (Falco cover)
9. "Kein schöner Land" (None more beautiful country) – 4:31
10. "Strom der Zeit" (Current of time) – 4:48
11. "Supernova" – 3:36 (limited edition only)

== Personnel ==
- Georgij Alexandrowitsch Makazaria (Георгий Александрович Макацария) – vocals
- Conrad Schrenk – guitar
- Peter Karolyi – bass
- Michael Stocker – drums
