= Wig Wamania =

Studio album by Wig Wam
- Released: 13 March 2006 (Europe); 26 July 2006 (Japan)
- Studio: Firehouse Studio, Halden
- Genre: Glam metal, hard rock
- Length: 42:55
- Label: Voices of Wonder (Europe); King Records (Japan)
- Producer: Trond Holter

Wig Wam chronology
Hard to Be a Rock 'n' Roller (2005)	Wig Wamania (2006)	Live in Tokyo (2007)

Singles from Wig Wamania
- 1. "Gonna Get You Someday" Released: 7 February 2006; 2. "Daredevil Heat" Released: 17 April 2006; 3. "At the End of the Day" Released: 24 April 2006; 4. "Bygone Zone" Released: 16 October 2006

Wig Wamania is the second studio album by Norwegian glam metal band Wig Wam. The album was released on 13 March, 2006, and produced by the band's guitarist Trond Holter. The album's first single "Gonna Get You Someday" was released on 7 February, 2006 and was also featured on the soundtrack for the Norwegian 2006 movie Lange Flate Ballær. Two bonus tracks were added for the Japanese version of the album, "After the Nine O'Clock News" and "Flying High", the latter being the first recording with bassist Bernt Jansen singing lead vocals.

In October 2006, Wig Wam released an acoustic version of the album's song "Bygone Zone" and performed the single for TV-aksjonen, an annual national Norwegian charity fund raising event, with all the sale proceeds from the single being donated to Médecins Sans Frontières. Wig Wamania is certified gold in Norway.

== Track listing ==
No.	Title	Lyrics	Music	Length
1.	"Wig Wamania"	Åge Sten Nilsen	Trond Holter	0:58
2.	"Rock My Ride"	Holter	Holter	4:13
3.	"Slave to Your Love"	Holter	Holter	3:51
4.	"Gonna Get You Someday"	Holter	Holter	3:09
5.	"Bygone Zone"	Nilsen	Nilsen	4:56
6.	"Daredevil Heat"	Nilsen	Øystein Andersen; Holter; Bernt Jansen; Nilsen	4:06
7.	"Kill My Rock 'n' Roll"	Nilsen	Holter; Nilsen	3:24
8.	"The Riddle"		Holter	3:15
9.	"At the End of the Day"	Holter	Holter	4:47
10.	"A R 'N' R Girl Like You"	Nilsen	Nilsen	3:09
11.	"Can't Get Her (Out of My Bed)"	Nilsen	Holter; Nilsen	2:54
12.	"Breaking All The Rules"	Nilsen	Jansen	4:13
Total length:				42:55

Japan bonus tracks
No.	Title	Writer(s)	Length
13.	"After the Nine O'Clock News"	Åge Sten Nilsen	3:34
14.	"Flying High"	Bernt Jansen	3:23
15.	"In My Dreams" (Live)	Trond Holter	5:40
Total length:			55:32

== Personnel ==
Wig Wam

- Glam (Åge Sten Nilsen) – lead vocals, backing vocals
- Teeny (Trond Holter) – guitars, backing vocals, keyboards, production, engineer
- Flash (Bernt Jansen) – bass, backing vocals, lead vocals (14)
- Sporty (Øystein Andersen) – drums

Additional personnel

- Eivind Skovdahl – mixing, engineer
- Morten Lund – mastering
- Eiríkur Hauksson – backing vocals
- Knut Anders Sørum – backing vocals
- Trude Holter – backing vocals
- Fredrik Melby – logo design
- Remi Juliebø – logo design
- Trygve Sørli – cover art design
- Erik Faukland – photography
- Vegard Kleven – photography assistant
- Ketil Mørk – photography
