= Wall Street (Wig Wam album) =

Studio album by Wig Wam
- Released: 21 May 2012 (Europe)
- Studio: The Rock Ranch Studio, Halden
- Genre: Glam metal, hard rock
- Length: 41:32
- Label: Frontiers Records
- Producer: Trond Holter

Wig Wam chronology
Non Stop Rock'n Roll (2010)	Wall Street (2012)	Never Say Die (2021)

Singles from Wall Street
- 1. "Wall Street" Released: 24 February 2012; 2. "The Bigger The Better" Released: 11 May 2012

Wall Street is the fourth studio by the Norwegian glam metal band Wig Wam. It was released on 21 May 2012, with the album's first single "Wall Street" released on 24 February. The album was produced by the band's guitarist Trond Holter. Like their previous album, Wall Street was recorded, mastered and mixed at the Rock Ranch Studio in Halden, Norway.

Miscommunication between Wig Wam's Norwegian label and Frontier Records caused the latter to use the "Wall Street" single artwork for the cover of the European album version. The artwork the band intended to use for the cover was used for the Norwegian and Japanese editions. Wall Street was Wig Wam's last album before the members split up in 2014 and reunited in 2019.

== Track listing ==
No.	Title	Writer(s)	Length
1.	"Wall Street"	Trond Holter	3:18
2.	"OMG! (Wish I Had a Gun)"	Holter	4:00
3.	"Victory Is Sweet"	Bernt Jansen	5:21
4.	"The Bigger The Better"	Tommy Berre; Åge Sten Nilsen	3:32
5.	"Bleeding Daylight"		3:15
6.	"Tides Will Turn"	Holter	4:27
7.	"Wrong Can Feel So Right"	Berre; Nilsen	3:42
8.	"One Million Enemies"	Jansen	3:43
9.	"Try My Body On"	Holter; Jansen; Nilsen	3:28
10.	"Natural High"	Holter; Jansen; Nilsen	3:46
11.	"Things Money Can't Buy"	Holter	3:00
Total length:			41:32

International bonus track

No.	Title	Length
12.	"School's Out" (Alice Cooper cover)	3:15
Total length:		44:47

Japan bonus track

No.	Title	Writer(s)	Length
12.	"Carlyle" (Demo version)	Holter; Jansen; Nilsen	3:42
Total length:			45:14

== Personnel ==
Wig Wam

- Glam (Åge Sten Nilsen) – vocals, backing vocals
- Teeny (Trond Holter) – guitars, backing vocals, production, engineering, mixing
- Flash (Bernt Jansen) – bass, backing vocals
- Sporty (Øystein Andersen) – drums, arrangements

Additional personnel

- Remo G. Munkeboe – engineering assistant
- Bjørn Engelmann – mastering
- Lasse Finbråthen – keyboards, piano (6, 8)
- Ingeborg Holter – backing vocals (1, 6)
- Trude Holter – backing vocals (1, 6)
- Johannes Andersen – additional drums (5)
- Haakon Holter – additional vocals (3)

== Chart positions ==
Chart (2012)	Peak position
Norway (VG-lista)	19
