= I Turn to You (Melanie C song) =

2000 single by Melanie C

Single by Melanie C

from the album Northern Star
- Released: 7 August 2000
- Recorded: 1999
- Studio: Various (Los Angeles, London, Glasgow)
- Genre: Dance-pop; trance
- Length: 5:53 (album version); 4:11 (Hex Hector radio mix)
- Label: Virgin
- Songwriters: Melanie Chisholm; Rick Nowels; Billy Steinberg
- Producer: Rick Nowels

Melanie C singles chronology
"Never Be the Same Again" (2000)	"I Turn to You" (2000)	"If That Were Me" (2000)

Audio sample
- file; help

Music video
- "I Turn to You" on YouTube

"I Turn to You" is a song by British singer Melanie C. It was released as the fourth single from her debut solo album, Northern Star (1999), on 7 August 2000 in the United Kingdom and became Melanie's second UK number-one single, selling 120,000 copies in its first week. "I Turn to You" also topped the charts of Austria, Denmark, the Netherlands and Sweden, as well as the US Billboard Dance Club Play chart. The main single was released in a remixed form by Hex Hector, who won the 2001 Grammy as Remixer of the Year.

== Background and recording ==
The album version of the song was recorded in 1999. It was written by Melanie C, Rick Nowels and Billy Steinberg. The song was chosen to be released as the fourth single of the album Northern Star, just after the big success of the number one single Never Be The Same Again. According to Melanie C after some discussions with Virgin Records executives, they decided to get some remixes done just to see what they sounded like. She stated that she was "blown away" as soon as she heard the Hex Hector remix, so along with the Virgin executives they decided that it should be released as a single. She said that "it just made sense – the whole Ibiza thing, it was a summer release, it was obvious that the Hex Hector mix was going to be a hit".

== Critical reception ==
Since the song's release, it has been critically acclaimed as one of the best solo Spice Girl singles. Billboard listed it as the number-one entry in the article "Girl Group Solo Songs: The 10 Best (Non-Beyonce) Singles of the Modern Era". Daily Record commented, "Dance orientated, this track looks set to spice up the charts. It's a bit of a change from girl power to power pop." The Digital Fix deemed the song "fantastic". Q magazine said, "Today we are enjoying Ibiza Mel. Video, haircut and moves shamelessly lifted straight from Madonna's Ray of Light. Constant repetition of the titles over some bogstandard techno-fun, and suddenly her Top Shop Motorhead t-shirt is nowhere to be seen. As attempts to dominate the lucrative Ibiza market go, it's innocuous enough, if tinged with fear over what her next move will be". The War Against Silence wrote "the dense, sparkling 'I Turn to You' reminds me alternately of recent Roxette and Seven the Hard Way-era Pat Benatar."

== Chart performance ==
With "I Turn to You", Melanie C achieved her tenth number-one UK single as a songwriter and it made her the first woman to top the UK charts as part of a quintet, quartet, duo and as a solo artist. With "Holler", the Spice Girls' final UK number one, Melanie C became the first female songwriter to write at least 11 UK number-one singles. Melanie C held this record alone until Madonna achieved her eleventh number one with "Hung Up" in 2005, then lost it when Madonna achieved her twelfth number one with "Sorry" in 2006.

== Music video ==
The music video for the song was filmed on the island of Ibiza in June 2000, and features shots of her dancing in Es Paradis nightclub. Melanie C has crimped blonde hair extensions in this video and there are constantly changing scenes of her dancing (in Esparadis) to sitting on a cliff to lying in blue water, possibly the sea or a swimming pool. The video ends with her and groups of people walking up the top of the cliff at sunset. The video was directed by Cameron Casey.

== Live performances ==
"I Turn to You" has been performed in all of Melanie C's concert tours, and is typically used as the encore song.

Melanie C performed the song during her appearance on American talk show The Tonight Show with Jay Leno, which aired by NBC on 6 April 2001. "I Turn to You" eventually became part of the set list for The Return of the Spice Girls tour in 2007 and 2008. The song was also performed by Cornelia Jakobs as a segment during the Liverpool Songbook during the interval of the 2023 Eurovision Song Contest, held in Melanie C's hometown of Liverpool.

== Track listings ==
- UK and Taiwanese CD1; South African CD single
1. "I Turn to You" (Hex Hector radio mix)
2. "I Turn to You" (StoneBridge R&B radio mix)
3. "Never Be the Same Again" (live at MTV)
4. "I Turn to You" (video)
- UK and Taiwanese CD2
1. "I Turn to You" (Damian LeGassick radio mix)
2. "I Turn to You" (StoneBridge club mix)
3. "Be the One" (live at MTV)
- UK 12-inch single

A. "I Turn to You" (Tilt's Maverick remix) – 10:13
B. "I Turn to You" (Tilt's Maverick dub) – 10:14

- UK 2×12-inch single

A. "I Turn to You" (StoneBridge club mix) – 8:32
B. "I Turn to You" (Hex Hector club mix) – 10:29
C. "I Turn to You" (Stonebridge F.F.F dub) – 6:48
D. "I Turn to You" (Hex Hector Ground Control dub) – 9:43

- UK cassette single
1. "I Turn to You" (Hex Hector radio mix)
2. "Never Be the Same Again" (recorded live at MTV)
3. "Be the One" (recorded live at MTV)
- European CD single
1. "I Turn to You" (Hex Hector radio mix)
2. "I Turn to You" (StoneBridge club mix)
- US maxi-CD single
1. "I Turn to You" (Hex Hector radio mix)
2. "I Turn to You" (StoneBridge club mix)
3. "I Turn to You" (Hex Hector club mix)
4. "I Turn to You" (Tilt's Maverick remix)
- US 12-inch single
1. "I Turn to You" (Hex Hector club mix) – 10:29
2. "I Turn to You" (Hex Hector radio mix) – 4:11
3. "I Turn to You" (StoneBridge club mix) – 8:29
- Australian CD single
1. "I Turn to You" (Hex Hector radio mix) – 4:11
2. "I Turn to You" (StoneBridge club mix) – 8:32
3. "Never Be the Same Again" (recorded live at MTV) – 4:00
4. "I Turn to You" (Hex Hector cub mix) – 10:29
5. "I Turn to You" (Tilt's Maverick Remix) – 10:13
6. "I Turn to You" (video) – 4:10

== Credits and personnel ==
Credits are taken from the UK CD1 liner notes and the Northern Star album booklet.

Studios

- Recorded at various studios in Los Angeles, London, and Glasgow
- Mixed at O'Henry's Sound Studio (Burbank, California)
- Mastered at Sterling Sound (New York City)

Original personnel

- Melanie Chisholm – writing
- Rick Nowels – writing, production
- Billy Steinberg – writing
- Rob Playford – co-production
- Patrick McCarthy – mixing
- Ted Jensen – mastering

Remix personnel

- Hex Hector – additional production and remix
- Dezrok – keyboards, programming, engineering
- Yak Bondy – vocal reproduction

== Charts ==
=== Weekly charts ===
Chart (2000–2001)	Peak position
Australia (ARIA)	11
Australian Dance (ARIA)	6
Austria (Ö3 Austria Top 40)	1
Belgium (Ultratop 50 Flanders)	8
Belgium (Ultratop 50 Wallonia)	11
Croatia (HRT)	10
Czech Republic (IFPI)	9
Denmark (IFPI)	1
Estonia (Eesti Top 20)	10
Europe (Eurochart Hot 100)	3
Finland (Suomen virallinen lista)	4
Germany (GfK)	2
Greece (IFPI)	5
Hungary (Mahasz)	4
Iceland (Íslenski Listinn Topp 40)	26
Ireland (IRMA)	6
Italy (FIMI)	15
Netherlands (Dutch Top 40)	1
Netherlands (Single Top 100)	2
Norway (VG-lista)	2
Poland Airplay (Music & Media)	8
Portugal (AFP)	8
Romania (Romanian Top 100)	5
Scottish Singles Sales (Official Charts)	2
Sweden (Sverigetopplistan)	1
Switzerland (Schweizer Hitparade)	3
UK Singles (Official Charts)	1
US Bubbling Under Hot 100 (Billboard)	14
US Dance Club Songs (Billboard)	1
US Dance Singles Sales (Billboard)	6

=== Year-end charts ===
Chart (2000)	Position
Australia (ARIA)	48
Austria (Ö3 Austria Top 40)	11
Belgium (Ultratop 50 Flanders)	42
Belgium (Ultratop 50 Wallonia)	45
Denmark (IFPI)	26
Europe (Eurochart Hot 100)	28
Germany (Media Control)	14
Ireland (IRMA)	40
Netherlands (Dutch Top 40)	19
Netherlands (Single Top 100)	11
Romania (Romanian Top 100)	14
Sweden (Hitlistan)	7
Switzerland (Schweizer Hitparade)	24
UK Singles (OCC)	27
US Dance Club Play (Billboard)	22

=== Decade-end charts ===
Chart (2000–2009)	Position
Netherlands (Single Top 100)	60

== Certifications ==
Region	Certification	Certified units/sales
Australia (ARIA)	Platinum	70,000^{^}
Austria (IFPI Austria)	Gold	25,000^{*}
Belgium (BRMA)	Gold	25,000^{*}
Denmark	—	6,063
Germany (BVMI)	Gold	250,000^{^}
Netherlands (NVPI)	Gold	40,000^{^}
Sweden (GLF)	Platinum	30,000^{^}
United Kingdom (BPI)	Gold	400,000^{‡}
^{*} Sales figures based on certification alone.^{^} Shipments figures based on certification alone.^{‡} Sales+streaming figures based on certification alone.

== Release history ==
Region	Date	Format(s)	Label(s)	Ref(s).
United Kingdom	7 August 2000	CD; cassette	Virgin	
Australia	21 August 2000	CD	Virgin	
United States	12 September 2000	Rhythmic contemporary; contemporary hit radio	Virgin	
New Zealand	29 September 2000	CD	Virgin	

== Wig Wam version ==
"I Turn to You"

Single by Wig Wam

from the album 667.. The Neighbour of the Beast
- B-side: "Crazy Things"
- Released: 2004
- Genre: Glam metal, hard rock
- Length: 4:08
- Label: Voices of Wonder
- Songwriters: Melanie Chisholm, Rick Nowels, Billy Steinberg

Wig Wam singles chronology
"I Turn to You" (2004)	"Crazy Things" (2004)

"I Turn to You" is the 2004 debut single of Norwegian glam metal band Wig Wam, released as the first single from their debut album, 667.. The Neighbour of the Beast. The CD single features only "Crazy Things". The track was later featured on Hard to Be a Rock 'n' Roller, a renamed reissue of 667.. The Neighbour of the Beast.

=== Track listing ===
No.	Title	Length
1.	"I Turn to You"
2.	"Crazy Things"

== Usage in media ==
After the song gained popularity, it was featured in the film Bend It Like Beckham. It was covered by Darkseed on "Ultimate Darkness", by Machinae Supremacy on "Webography", and by Wig Wam on 667.. The Neighbour of the Beast. The song was also featured in the musical Viva Forever!, a musical show based on the songs of the Spice Girls. It was featured on the Showtime Unlimited promo.

== See also ==
- List of Billboard Hot Dance Music/Club Play number ones of 2000
- List of UK singles chart number ones of the 2000s
