= Out of the Darkness =

Out of the Darkness may refer to:

== Film and television ==
- Out of the Darkness (1915 film), an early American silent film.
- Out of the Darkness (1971 film), a Thai science fiction musical action drama film directed by Chatrichalerm Yukol
- Out of the Darkness (1978 film), an American film
- Out of the Darkness (1985 film), a 1985 television film about the detective who tracked down the murderer Son of Sam
- Out of the Darkness, a 2011 feature-length documentary about the ex-porn star Shelley Lubben
- Out of the Darkness (da:De forbandede år), a 2022 Danish film directed by Anders Refn

== Music ==
- Out of the Darkness (Jack Starr album), 1984
- Out of the Darkness, a 2012 album by A Sound of Thunder
- Out of the Darkness (Sacred Mother Tongue album), 2013
- "Jerusalem" (Out of Darkness Comes Light), a 2006 song by Hasidic Jewish reggae singer Matisyahu
- (1987–1989) Out of the Darkness – Into the Light, a 1991 album by Glam-metal band Lillian Axe
- Out of the Darkness (Retrospective: 1994–1999), a 2006 studio album by Midnight Syndicate
- Out of the Darkness, Into the Light, a 1998 compilation album by Dolomite
- "Reach out of the Darkness", a 1968 single by the band Friend & Lover

== Books ==
- Babylon 5: Legions of Fire – Out of the Darkness, a 1998 novel by Peter David
- Out of the Darkness (Hinton novel), a teenage novel by Nigel Hinton
- Out of the Darkness (Turtledove novel), by Harry Turtledove is the sixth and final book in the Darkness series

== Other uses ==
- Out of the Darkness (Community and Overnight Walks), benefit events for the American Foundation for Suicide Prevention
