= Hard to Be a Rock'n Roller =

Studio album (reissue) by Wig Wam
- Released: 10 January 2005
- Recorded: 2004
- Studio: Firehouse Studio, Halden; Hitsville, Halden
- Genre: Glam metal, hard rock
- Length: 54:20
- Label: Voices of Wonder
- Producer: Trond Holter, Ole Evenrude, Eivind Skaavdal

Wig Wam chronology
| 667.. The Neighbour of the Beast (2004) | Hard to Be a Rock'n Roller (2005) | Wig Wamania (2006) |

Singles from Hard to Be a Rock'n Roller
- 1. "Hard to Be a Rock'n Roller" Released: 25 October 2004; 2. "In My Dreams" Released: 7 March 2005; 3. "Bless the Night" Released: 8 August 2005

Hard to Be a Rock'n Roller is the reissue of Norwegian rock band Wig Wam's debut album 667.. The Neighbour of the Beast. It was released in Scandinavia on 10 January 2005, and featured a re-arranged tracklist and the addition of an instrumental track titled "The Drop" and a radio edit of "Hard to Be a Rock'n Roller".

After Wig Wam won the Melodi Grand Prix competition in March 2005 with the single "In My Dreams" and gained entry to the Eurovision Song Contest 2005 held in Kyiv, the album was reissued to include the single for release in Europe and renamed Hard to Be a Rock'n Roller.. In Kiev! The band placed ninth at the Eurovision Song Contest with "In My Dreams" and following the band's performance, the album was reissued for releases in Scandinavia and Asia, titled Hard to Be a Rock'n Roller.. and Hard to Be a Rock'n Roller.. In Tokyo! respectively. The album and "In My Dreams" were both certified platinum in Norway, and marked an international breakthrough for the band.

== Track listing ==
Hard to Be a Rock'n Roller
| No. | Title | Writer(s) | Length |
|---|---|---|---|
| 1. | "Hard to Be a Rock'n Roller (Radio Edit)" | Trond Holter; Åge Sten Nilsen | 3:43 |
| 2. | "667" | | 0:50 |
| 3. | "The Best Song in the World" | Holter; Nilsen | 3:11 |
| 4. | "Crazy Things" | Holter; Bernt Jansen; Nilsen | 3:07 |
| 5. | "Bless the Night" | Holter; Nilsen | 3:50 |
| 6. | "The Drop" | Holter | 3:59 |
| 7. | "No More Living on Lies" | Holter | 3:54 |
| 8. | "Out Of Time" | Holter | 4:04 |
| 9. | "Mine All Mine" | Holter | 3:42 |
| 10. | "Tell Me Where to Go" | Jansen | 4:13 |
| 11. | "Car-Lyle" | Holter; Jansen; Nilsen | 3:55 |
| 12. | "Erection" | Holter | 2:10 |
| 13. | "I Turn to You" (Melanie C cover) | | 4:09 |
| 14. | "A Long Way" | Nilsen | 4:26 |
| 15. | "Hard to Be a Rock'n Roller" | Holter; Nilsen | 5:07 |
| Total length: | | | 54:20 |

Hard to Be a Rock'n Roller..
| No. | Title | Writer(s) | Length |
|---|---|---|---|
| 1. | "In My Dreams" | Trond Holter | 3:02 |
| 2. | "Hard to Be a Rock'n Roller" | Holter; Åge Sten Nilsen | 5:07 |
| 3. | "Bless the Night" | Holter; Nilsen | 3:50 |
| 4. | "I Turn to You" (Melanie C cover) | | 4:09 |
| 5. | "Out of Time" | Holter | 4:04 |
| 6. | "Mine All Mine" | Holter | 3:42 |
| 7. | "The Drop" | Holter | 3:59 |
| 8. | "Tell Me Where to Go" | Bernt Jansen | 4:13 |
| 9. | "No More Living on Lies" | Holter | 3:54 |
| 10. | "Erection" | Jansen | 2:10 |
| 11. | "Car-Lyle" | Holter; Jansen; Nilsen | 3:55 |
| 12. | "The Best Song in the World" | Holter; Nilsen | 3:11 |
| 13. | "A Long Way" | Nilsen | 4:26 |
| 14. | "Crazy Things" | Holter; Jansen; Nilsen | 3:07 |
| Total length: | | | 52:49 |

Hard to Be a Rock'n Roller.. in Kiev!
| No. | Title | Writer(s) | Length |
|---|---|---|---|
| 1. | "In My Dreams" | Trond Holter | 3:02 |
| 2. | "667" | | 0:50 |
| 3. | "The Best Song in the World" | Holter; Åge Sten Nilsen | 3:11 |
| 4. | "Crazy Things" | Holter; Bernt Jansen; Nilsen | 3:07 |
| 5. | "Bless the Night" | Holter; Nilsen | 3:50 |
| 6. | "The Drop" | Holter | 3:59 |
| 7. | "No More Living on Lies" | Holter | 3:54 |
| 8. | "Out Of Time" | Holter | 4:04 |
| 9. | "Mine All Mine" | Holter | 3:42 |
| 10. | "Tell Me Where to Go" | Jansen | 4:13 |
| 11. | "Car-Lyle" | Holter; Jansen; Nilsen | 3:55 |
| 12. | "Erection" | Holter | 2:10 |
| 13. | "I Turn to You" (Melanie C cover) | | 4:09 |
| 14. | "A Long Way" | Nilsen | 4:26 |
| 15. | "Hard to Be a Rock'n Roller" | Holter; Nilsen | 5:07 |
| Total length: | | | 53:39 |

Hard to Be a Rock'n Roller.. in Tokyo!
| No. | Title | Writer(s) | Length |
|---|---|---|---|
| 1. | "In My Dreams" | Trond Holter | 3:02 |
| 2. | "667" | | 0:50 |
| 3. | "The Best Song in the World" | Holter; Åge Sten Nilsen | 3:11 |
| 4. | "Crazy Things" | Holter; Bernt Jansen; Nilsen | 3:07 |
| 5. | "Bless the Night" | Holter; Nilsen | 3:50 |
| 6. | "The Drop" | Holter | 3:59 |
| 7. | "No More Living on Lies" | Holter | 3:54 |
| 8. | "Out Of Time" | Holter | 4:04 |
| 9. | "Mine All Mine" | Holter | 3:42 |
| 10. | "Tell Me Where to Go" | Jansen | 4:13 |
| 11. | "Car-Lyle" | Holter; Jansen; Nilsen | 3:55 |
| 12. | "Erection" | Holter | 2:10 |
| 13. | "I Turn to You" (Melanie C cover) | | 4:09 |
| 14. | "A Long Way" | Nilsen | 4:26 |
| 15. | "Hard to Be a Rock'n Roller" | Holter; Nilsen | 5:07 |
| 16. | "I Was Made for Loving You" (Kiss cover) | | 4:04 |
| 17. | "Dschingshis Khan" (Live, Dschinghis Khan cover) | | 3:18 |
| 18. | "Ballroom Blitz" (Live, Sweet cover) | | 5:09 |
| Total length: | | | 66:10 |

== Release history ==
| Title | Region | Date |
|---|---|---|
| Hard to Be a Rock'n Roller | Scandinavia | January 10, 2005 |
| Hard to Be a Rock'n Roller.. in Kiev! | Europe | March 15, 2005 |
| Hard to Be a Rock'n Roller.. | Scandinavia | June 28, 2005 |
| Hard to Be a Rock'n Roller.. in Tokyo! | Asia | August 23, 2006 |

== Personnel ==
Wig Wam

- Glam (Åge Sten Nilsen) – vocals, acoustic guitar, artwork
- Teeny (Trond Holter) – guitars, backing vocals, production, mixing
- Flash (Bernt Jansen) – bass, backing vocals
- Sporty (Øystein Andersen) – drums

Additional personnel

- Morten Lund – mastering
- Jonas Groth – backing vocals ("In My Dreams")
- Erik "Hawk" Hauksson – backing vocals
- Trude Holter – backing vocals
- Stian Joneid – backing vocals
- Eivind Skaavdal – production, mixing ("In My Dreams")
- Thomas Siqueland – mixing ("I Turn To You", "No More Living On Lies")
- Ole "Dr. Evil Rude" Evenrude – production ("I Turn To You", "No More Living On Lies")
- Jon Edvard Brandt – film production
- Odd Steinar Tøllefsen – cover art photography
- Tom Andreasen – cover art photography
