= Out of the Dark (Wig Wam album) =

Studio album by Wig Wam
- Released: 10 February 2023
- Studio: Spoon Bay Studios
- Genre: Glam metal, hard rock
- Length: 44:02
- Label: Frontiers Music
- Producer: Trond Holter

Wig Wam chronology
Never Say Die (2021)	Out of the Dark (2023)

Singles from Out of the Dark
- 1. "Out of the Dark" Released: 2 December 2022; 2. "High n Dry" Released: 3 January 2023; 3. "Forevermore" Released: 27 January 2023

Out of the Dark is the sixth studio album by Norwegian glam metal band Wig Wam, released on 10 February 2023. The album was announced in December 2022, along with a release of the title track as a single. Out of the Dark was produced by the band's guitarist Trond Holter and recorded at his home studio, Spoon Bay Studios.

== Background and recording ==
Following a resurgence in popularity after the band's song "Do Ya Wanna Taste It" from the Non Stop Rock'n Roll album was used as the theme song for the HBO Max television series Peacemaker and ongoing COVID-19 pandemic restrictions in Norway, Wig Wam started writing songs for a new album in the first half of 2022. The album was produced by the band's guitarist Trond Holter, who along with singer Åge Sten Nilsen and bassist Bernt Jansen wrote a majority of the album's songs. Recordings took place at Holter's home studio, Spoon Bay Studio, in Halden.

== Release and promotion ==
Out of the Dark was released on 10 February 2023, with three singles preceding its release: "Out of the Dark", "High n Dry" and "Forevermore". Wig Wam went on tour in support of the album both before and after its release, which included shows in Norway and their first tours in Australia and the United States.

== Track listing ==
All lyrics are written by Åge Sten Nilsen, except where noted.

No.	Title	Lyrics	Music	Length
1.	"Out of the Dark"	Trond Holter; Åge Sten Nilsen	Holter; Nilsen	4:28
2.	"High n Dry"		Nilsen	3:33
3.	"Forevermore"	Holter	Holter	4:55
4.	"Bad Luck Chuck"		Bernt Jansen; Holter; Nilsen; Øystein Andersen	3:48
5.	"Uppercut Shazam"		Holter; Nilsen	3:52
6.	"Ghosting You"		Nilsen	3:48
7.	"The Purpose"		Jansen; Holter; Nilsen	4:39
8.	"American Dream"	Jansen	Jansen	3:51
9.	"'79"	Holter	Holter	4:22
10.	"God by Your Side"	Jansen	Jansen; Holter	3:45
11.	"Sailor and the Desert Sun"		Kjell Åge H. Karlsen; Eirik Renton; Nilsen	3:01
Total length:				44:02

== Personnel ==
Wig Wam

- Åge Sten "Glam" Nilsen – lead vocals, backing vocals, piano (2)
- Trond "Teeny" Holter – guitar, backing vocals, production, engineering, programming
- Bernt "Flash" Jansen – bass, backing vocals, lead vocals (10)
- Øystein "Sporty" Andersen – drums

Additional personnel

- Lasse Finbråten – keyboards, backing vocals
- Eivind Skovdahl – mixing
- Magnus Gulbrandsen – mastering
- Haakon Nilo Holter – backing vocals (3)
- Ingeborg Nilo Holter – backing vocals (3)
- Vilde Trondsdatter Holter – backing vocals (3)
- Stan-W Decker – artwork, layout
- Fredrik Arff – photography
