= Youssou =

Youssou is a Senegalese given name. Notable people with the name include:

- Youssou Lo (born 1992), Senegalese footballer
- Youssou N'Dour (born 1959), Senegalese singer, percussionist, songwriter, composer, and actor
- Youssou Ndoye (born 1991), Senegalese basketball player
