= Christine (Christine Guldbrandsen album) =

Studio album by Christine Guldbrandsen
- Released: February 5, 2007
- Recorded: 2006/2007
- Genres: Pop, folk
- Length: 35:09 (Norwegian edition)
- Label: MBN Music Business Norway
- Producers: Kjetil Fluge, Christine Guldbrandsen, Atle Halstensen, Erlend Fauske, Andrew Boyle.

Christine Guldbrandsen chronology
Moments (2004)	Christine (2007)

Christine is the third album by Norwegian pop singer Christine Guldbrandsen, released in 2007 in Norway through MBN Music Business Norway. The album is progressive Celtic, using a combination of traditional and modern instruments.

== Album information ==
Guldbransen's third album and was released on February 5, 2007. The songs on this album span a wide range of styles, from ballads with choir and piano, to soundscapes. The lyrics are primarily in Norwegian, though Latin and English is used on a couple of songs. Guldbrandsen wrote several of the songs in collaboration with her creative team. One of these is Alvedansen, Norway's entry for the Eurovision Song Contest 2006, reworked for the album. Apart from one Norwegian folk song Den Dag Kjem Aldri the rest of the album is new material. The song Dansekjolen placed 1st in the Norwegian charts.

== Reviews ==
Professional ratings
Review scores
Source	Rating
TA	5/5 stars
Demokraten	5/5 stars
Musical Discoveries	4/5 stars
Dagbladet	4/5 stars
BT	4/5 stars
Romerikes Blad	4/5 stars
Guldbrandsølen Dagningen	4/5 stars
BA	4/5 stars

A review on the Musical Discoveries website states, "Artists can often deliver more emotional content when singing in their native tongue and this evolution has worked well for Christine... The combination of traditional instruments and modern arrange- ments work perfectly to support Christine's far ranging vocal power."

== Track listing ==
#	Title	Translation	Composers	Time
1.	"Dansekjolen"	The Dancing Dress	Kjetil Fluge, Atle Halstensen, Christine Guldbrandsen	3:12
2.	"Langt Bortenfor"	Far Beyond	Kjetil Fluge, Christine Guldbrandsen	4:22
3.	"Tampen Brenner"	Getting Warmer	Kjetil Fluge, Christine Guldbrandsen	2:40
4.	"Alvedansen"	The Elf Dance	Kjetil Fluge, Atle Halstensen, Christine Guldbrandsen	3:38
5.	"Mellom Himmel og Jord"	Between Heaven and Earth	Kjetil Fluge, Andrew Boyle, Christine Guldbrandsen	3:58
6.	"Spindelvev"	Spiderwebs	Kjetil Fluge, Andrew Boyle	3:26
7.	"Den Dag Kjem Aldri"	The Day Never Comes	Kjetil Fluge, Åsmund Olavson Vinje	2:36
8.	"Journeys Song"		Kjetil Fluge, Andrew Boyle	4:35
9.	"Timeglasset"	Hourglass	Atle Halstensen, Andrew Boyle	2:58
10.	"Dove"		Atle Halstensen, Andrew Boyle	4:38
