= Christine, California =

Former settlement in California, US

Coordinates: 39.1170°N 123.5144°W

Christine (formerly, Guntleys) is a former settlement in Mendocino County, California, United States. It was located on a stage coach line 6.5 miles (10 km) northwest of Philo.

A post office operated at Christine from 1874 to 1912, with a closure during part of 1910. The original white settlers were a set of Swiss families, one of which was surnamed Guntley, another had a daughter with the name Christine, after whom the town was named.
