= Stahlhammer =

Austrian Neue Deutsche Härte band

- Origin: Austria
- Genres: Neue Deutsche Härte, industrial metal
- Years active: 1992–2010
- Labels: High Gain, Nuclear Blast, Warner/Chappell, East West, Prime Time Muzik, Mercury, Universal, Goodsongs, Def-Dick
- Members: Gary Wheeler; Peter Karolyi; Michael Stocker
- Past members: Niko Stössl; Thomas Schuler; Conrad Schrenk; Georgij Alexandrowitsch Makazaria
- Website: stahlhammer.org

Stahlhammer (German for "Steel Hammer") is a Neue Deutsche Härte band from Austria that formed in 1992. They incorporate elements from hardcore, groove metal, industrial metal and symphonic metal into their songs. The band has to this date released six albums, where the majority of songs are in German. Their latest album is Opera Noir, which was released in March 2006.

== History ==
Stahlhammer is one of the most popular bands to ever come out of Austria. The band name was originally going to be "Eisenherz", but copyright laws for the German "Prince Valiant" stories prohibited this, though this later became the name of their fourth album.

The band's first album Killer Instinkt, released in 1995, became widely known throughout Austria and Germany due to the success of their video for the Pink Floyd cover "Another Brick in the Wall". Among Stahlhammer's several covers is a metal-styled version of MC Hammer's famous hit "U Can't Touch This".

== Band members ==
=== Current members ===
- Gary Wheeler – vocals, guitars, keyboards, programming
- Peter Karolyi – bass
- Michael Stoker – drums

=== Former members ===
- Niko Stössl – guitars
- Thomas Schuler – guitars
- Conrad Schrenk – guitars
- Georgij Alexandrowitsch Makazaria – vocals

=== Members by album ===
- Killer Instinct:

Gary Wheeler (vocals), Thomas Schuler (guitar), Peter Karolyi (bass), and Michael Stocker (drums)

- Wiener Blut:

Georgij Alexandrowitsch Makazaria (vocals), Thomas Schuler (guitar), Peter Karolyi (bass), and Michael Stocker (drums)

- Feind hört mit:

Georgij Alexandrowitsch Makazaria (vocals), Conrad Schrenk (guitar), Peter Karolyi (bass), and Michael Stocker (drums)

- Eisenherz:

Gary Wheeler (vocals), Niko Stössl (guitar), Peter Karolyi (bass), and Michael Stocker (drums)

- Stahlmania:

Gary Wheeler (vocals, guitar), Peter Karolyi (bass), and Michael Stocker (drums)

- Opera Noir:

Gary Wheeler (vocals, guitar), Peter Karolyi (bass), and Geoff Dugmore (drums)

== Discography ==
- Killer Instinkt (1995)
- Wiener Blut (1997)
- Feind hört mit (1999)
- Eisenherz (2002)
- Stahlmania (2004)
- Opera Noir (2006)
