= Out of the Dark (Into the Light) =

1998 album by Falco

Studio album by Falco
- Released: 27 February 1998 (Europe); 2 March 1998 (worldwide)
- Recorded: 1995–1997
- Genres: Pop rock; dance; techno; pop-rap
- Length: 41:00
- Label: EMI Electrola
- Producers: Torsten Börger; George Glück

Falco chronology
Nachtflug (1992)	Out of the Dark (Into the Light) (1998)	Verdammt wir leben noch (1999)

Singles from Out of the Dark (Into the Light)
- 1. "Mutter, der Mann mit dem Koks ist da" Released: 1 March 1996 (as T»MA); 2. "Naked" Released: 11 August 1996 (as Falco featuring T»MB); 3. "Out of the Dark" Released: 20 March 1998; 4. "Egoist" Released: 1998

Professional ratings
Review scores
Source	Rating
AllMusic	3.5/5 stars

Out of the Dark (Into the Light) is the eighth album by Austrian singer Falco. It was released in Europe three weeks after his death on 6 February 1998.

== Background information ==
In 1995, the techno-styled song "Mutter, der Mann mit dem Koks ist da" ("Mother, the man with the coke is here") by T»MA ("T»MA" as Falco's pseudonym) hit the market and brought the artist back into the charts of all German-speaking countries. In the song Falco plays with the ambiguity of the German word "Koks" which, as the English word "coke", is used for both cocaine and the carbon fuel coke. Although Falco's band leader found "Out of the Dark" good enough to be released as the second single, Falco himself wanted it to be released on the album only.

The follow-up single became "Naked" which was quite successful in Austria but did not meet Falco's expectations in Germany, leading him to postpone the album release. It is known that Falco was unsure about the perfect order of the CD tracks, so that he often changed it, and he also planned to record a track called "Tomorrow Never Knows" as a cover from the Beatles (this is shown on the facsimile attached to the CD). In the time shortly before his death, Falco also removed some songs that were eventually released on further albums, 'Best Of's and single CDs.

On 6 February 1998, Falco made one of his last phone calls. He told his guitarist, Milan Polak, to come over to the Dominican Republic because he wanted to record some songs with his band, but this never took place as Falco died in the afternoon of that day. Three weeks after Falco's death in a car accident, the album was officially released in Austria, Germany, Switzerland and the Netherlands. The worldwide release was on 2 March 1998. Its previous title had been "Egoisten" ("egoists").

The album turned out to be a big success in German-speaking countries, resulting in another No. 1 in Austria, No. 3 in Germany and No. 4 in Switzerland; it also reached No. 35 in Hungary. The posthumous singles charted quite well in most countries in comparison to those from his previous three albums. The single "Out of the Dark" was especially successful, climbing to No. 2 of the Austrian and the German charts respectively and also had very good airplay. Furthermore, it came under the Top 5 of the Latvian airplay charts and even reached the Argentine Airplay Charts of Buenos Aires with #98. Most of the posthumous success is credited to the song "Out of the Dark".

The song "Out of the Dark" contains the line "...muss ich denn sterben, um zu leben?" ("...do I have to die in order to live?"). This made many people think Falco felt that he was going to die soon, though he had already performed the song live a year before his death. The actual inspiration for this line remains unknown. "Egoist" and also "The Spirit Never Dies (Jeanny Final)" became his last notable hits in Germany and Switzerland. Ten years after Falco's death, the album re-entered the Austrian charts again.

== Track listing ==
1. "No Time for Revolution" – 3:52
2. "Out of the Dark" – 3:37
3. "Shake" – 3:42
4. "Der Kommissar 2000" – 3:48
5. "Mutter, der Mann mit dem Koks ist da" – 3:39
6. "Hit Me" – 3:47
7. "Cyberlove" – 3:34
8. "Egoist" – 3:27
9. "Naked (Full Frontal Version)" / "Geld" (hidden track) – 11:29

=== 2012 remaster bonus disc ===
1. "Egoist" (Remix) – 3:37
2. "Push! Push!" (Jeo Radio Mix) – 3:46
3. "Push! Push!" (Dee Jay Sören Radio Mix) – 3:31
4. "Push! Push!" (Jeo Extended Mix) – 5:31
5. "Push! Push!" (Dee Jay Sören Extended Mix) – 5:00
6. "Out of the Dark" (Remix) – 3:25
7. "Out of the Dark" (Instrumental) – 3:38
8. "Naked" (Original Mix) – 3:49
9. "Naked" (Sweetbox Short Mix) – 3:08
10. "Naked" (Sweetbox Filter Mix) – 6:50
11. "Naked" (Sweetbox Club Mix) – 6:16
12. "Naked" (Beam's Devil Dance) – 6:56
13. "Naked" (D-Syndroma House Mix) – 5:28
14. "Naked" (D-Syndroma Night Mix) – 6:02
15. "Naked" (D-Syndroma Radio Mix) – 4:00

== Singles ==
"Out of the Dark" and "Egoist" were released posthumously after Falco's death.

Title	Year	Peak position				
Title	Year	AUS	GER	SWI	CZE	SLO
"Mutter, der Mann mit dem Koks ist da" (as T»MA)	1996	3	11	30	—	—
"Naked" (as Falco feat. T»MB)	1996	4	50	—	—	—
"Out of the Dark"	1998	2	2	3	3	7
"Egoist"	1998	6	4	19	5	—
"—" denotes a recording that did not chart or was not released in that territory.

== Charts ==
=== Weekly charts ===
Chart (1998)	Peak position
Austrian Albums (Ö3 Austria)	1
German Albums (Offizielle Top 100)	3
Hungarian Albums (MAHASZ)	35
Swiss Albums (Schweizer Hitparade)	4

=== Year-end charts ===
Chart (1998)	Position
Austrian Albums (Ö3 Austria)	3
German Albums (Offizielle Top 100)	9
Swiss Albums (Schweizer Hitparade)	25

== Sales ==
Region	Certification	Certified units/sales
Austria	—	110,000
