= Non Stop Rock'n Roll =

Studio album by Wig Wam
- Released: 21 January 2010
- Studio: The Rock Ranch Studio, Halden
- Genre: Glam metal, hard rock
- Length: 40:42
- Label: Bonnier Amigo Music (Europe); King Records (Japan); Frontier Records (USA)
- Producer: Trond Holter

Wig Wam chronology
Live in Tokyo (2007)	Non Stop Rock'n Roll (2010)	Wall Street (2012)

Singles from Non Stop Rock'n Roll
- 1. "Do Ya Wanna Taste It" Released: 9 March 2010

Non Stop Rock'n Roll is the third studio album by the Norwegian glam metal band Wig Wam. It was released on 21 January 2010, making it the first Wig Wam album to be released worldwide on the same day. The album was produced by the band's guitarist Trond Holter, while singer Åge Sten Nilsen and bassist Bernt Jansen contributed songwriting alongside the guitarist. The album was recorded, mastered and mixed at the Rock Ranch Studio in Halden, Norway. Non Stop Rock'n Roll is certified gold in Norway.

== Release and promotion ==
On 25 February 2010, the band began filming the video for the lead single "Do You Wanna Taste It". It was the first Wig Wam single to not be released in CD format. The video was released by Frontier Records on their official YouTube channel on 9 March 2010.

== Reception ==
Professional ratings
Review scores
Source	Rating
VG	4/6 stars
Classic Rock	6/10 stars

Upon its release, Non Stop Rock'n Roll received overall positive reviews from critics.

== Track listing ==
No.	Title	Lyrics	Music	Length
1.	"Do Ya Wanna Taste It"	Åge Sten Nilsen	Trond Holter; Nilsen	2:56
2.	"Walls Come Down"	Nilsen	Holter; Nilsen	3:57
3.	"Wild One"	Holter	Holter	3:22
4.	"C'mon Everybody"	Bernt Jansen	Jansen	4:14
5.	"Man In The Moon"	Jansen	Jansen	3:59
6.	"Still I'm Burning"	Holter	Holter	3:33
7.	"All You Wanted"	Nilsen	Nilsen	3:14
8.	"Non Stop Rock'n Roll"	Nilsen	Holter	3:50
9.	"From Here"	Nilsen	Holter; Nilsen	3:15
10.	"Rocket Through My Heart"	Simon Walker	Tommy Berre; Nilsen	3:27
11.	"Chasing Rainbows"	Jansen	Jansen	4:55
Total length:				40:42

International bonus track
No.	Title	Lyrics	Music	Length
12.	"Gotta Get It On"	Holter; Jansen	Holter; Jansen	3:19
Total length:				44:01

Japan bonus track
No.	Title	Writer(s)	Length
12.	"Bless the Night" (2002 demo)	Holter; Nilsen

== Personnel ==
Wig Wam

- Glam (Åge Sten Nilsen) – vocals, backing vocals, arrangements
- Teeny (Trond Holter) – guitars, backing vocals, arrangements, production, engineering, mixing
- Flash (Bernt Jansen) – bass, backing vocals, arrangements
- Sporty (Øystein Andersen) – drums, arrangements

Additional personnel

- Remo G. Munkeboe – engineering assistant
- Bjørn Engelmann – mastering
- Trude Holter – backing vocals (3, 6)
- Eiríkur Hauksson – backing vocals (6)
- Haakon Holter – backing vocals (6)
- Corneilus Richardsen – choir (11)
- Haakon Holter – choir (11)
- Herman Richardsen – choir (11)
- Ingeborg Holter – choir (11)
- Rikke Austvik – choir (11)
- Dagfinn L. Andersen – cover artwork
- Anne Romslo – photography
- Maria Harbak – photography assistant

== Charts ==
=== Album ===
Year	Chart	Position
2010	Norwegian Albums Chart	3

=== Singles ===
Year	Title	Chart	Position
2010	"Do Ya Wanna Taste It"	Norwegian Singles Chart	11

== In other media ==
A shortened version of the track "Do You Wanna Taste It" is used as the opening credits song for the title sequence of the first season of the HBO Max series Peacemaker. The sequence features the entire cast performing a dance, completely deadpan, choreographed by Charissa-Lee Barton. The title sequence was widely praised, and it led to Wig Wam, who were dropped by their booking agency shortly before it was released, to experience a career resurgence.
