= In My Dreams (Wig Wam song) =

2004 single by Wig Wam

Single by Wig Wam

from the album Hard to Be a Rock'n Roller
- A-side: "In My Dreams"
- B-side: "Out of Time" and "Crazy Things"
- Released: 25 October 2004
- Genre: Glam metal, hard rock
- Length: 3:01
- Label: Voice of Wonder
- Songwriter: Trond Holter

Wig Wam singles chronology
"Hard to Be a Rock'n Roller" (2004)	"In My Dreams" (2004)	"Bless the Night" (2005)

Eurovision Song Contest 2005 entry
- Country: Norway
- Artists: Åge Sten Nilsen; Trond Holter; Øystein Andersen; Bernt Jansen
- As: Wig Wam
- Language: English
- Composer: Trond Holter
- Lyricist: Trond Holter

Finals performance
- Semi-final result: 6th
- Semi-final points: 164
- Final result: 9th
- Final points: 125

Entry chronology
- ◄ "High" (2004)
- "Alvedansen" (2006) ►

"In My Dreams" was the Norwegian entry in the Eurovision Song Contest 2005, performed in English by Wig Wam.

The song is a glam metal number, in keeping with the band's view that "rock'n'roll is the new schlager". Lead singer wonders whether his relationship is "real or just a fantasy", and tells his lover that he is "scared of waking up and you'll be gone / face the truth and I'll be all alone", a fear that he puts to rest by suggesting that they should "get into the groove" and live for the moment.

The performance was as flamboyant as the music suggested, with the band dressed variously in grey spandex or wearing a military hat among other things. Paying tribute to the Orange Revolution which had taken place in host country Ukraine the year before, Glam attached an orange banner to his microphone stand.

As Norway had not finished the Eurovision Song Contest 2004 in the top ten, the song was performed in the semi-final. Here, it was performed thirteenth, following Estonia's Suntribe with "Let's Get Loud" and preceding Romania's Luminița Anghel & Sistem with "Let Me Try". At the close of voting, it had received 164 points, placing 6th in the 25-strong semi-final and qualifying for the final.

In the final, it was performed fifth, following the Romanian entry and preceding Turkey's Gülseren with "Rimi Rimi Ley". At the close of voting, it had received 125 points, placing 9th in a field of 24, guaranteeing Norway a place in the final at the next Contest.

Following its success, "In My Dreams" became a favourite among contest fans. At the Congratulations special in late 2005, the duo Bobbysocks! made reference to the fact that it had broken with the joking tradition that Norway won in years ending with a 5. The duo sang part of the chorus, and the audience responded in kind.

The song was succeeded as Norwegian representative at the 2006 contest by Christine Guldbrandsen with "Alvedansen".

"In My Dreams" was also released as the band's third single and second single for their second studio album Hard to Be a Rock'n Roller, which was reissued after winning Melodi Grand Prix. The CD single features the single titletrack and "Out of Time" (Scandinavia) and "Crazy Things" (Europe), additional album tracks.

== Track listing ==
Scandinavian release

No.	Title	Length
1.	"In My Dreams"
2.	"Out of Time"

European release

No.	Title	Length
1.	"In My Dreams"
2.	"Crazy Things"

== Charts ==
Chart (2005)	Peak position
Norway (VG-lista)	1
Sweden (Sverigetopplistan)	26

== Certifications ==
Certifications for "In My Dreams"
Region	Certification	Certified units/sales
Norway (IFPI Norway)	Gold	30,000^{‡}
^{‡} Sales+streaming figures based on certification alone.
