= Wig Wam =

Norwegian glam metal band

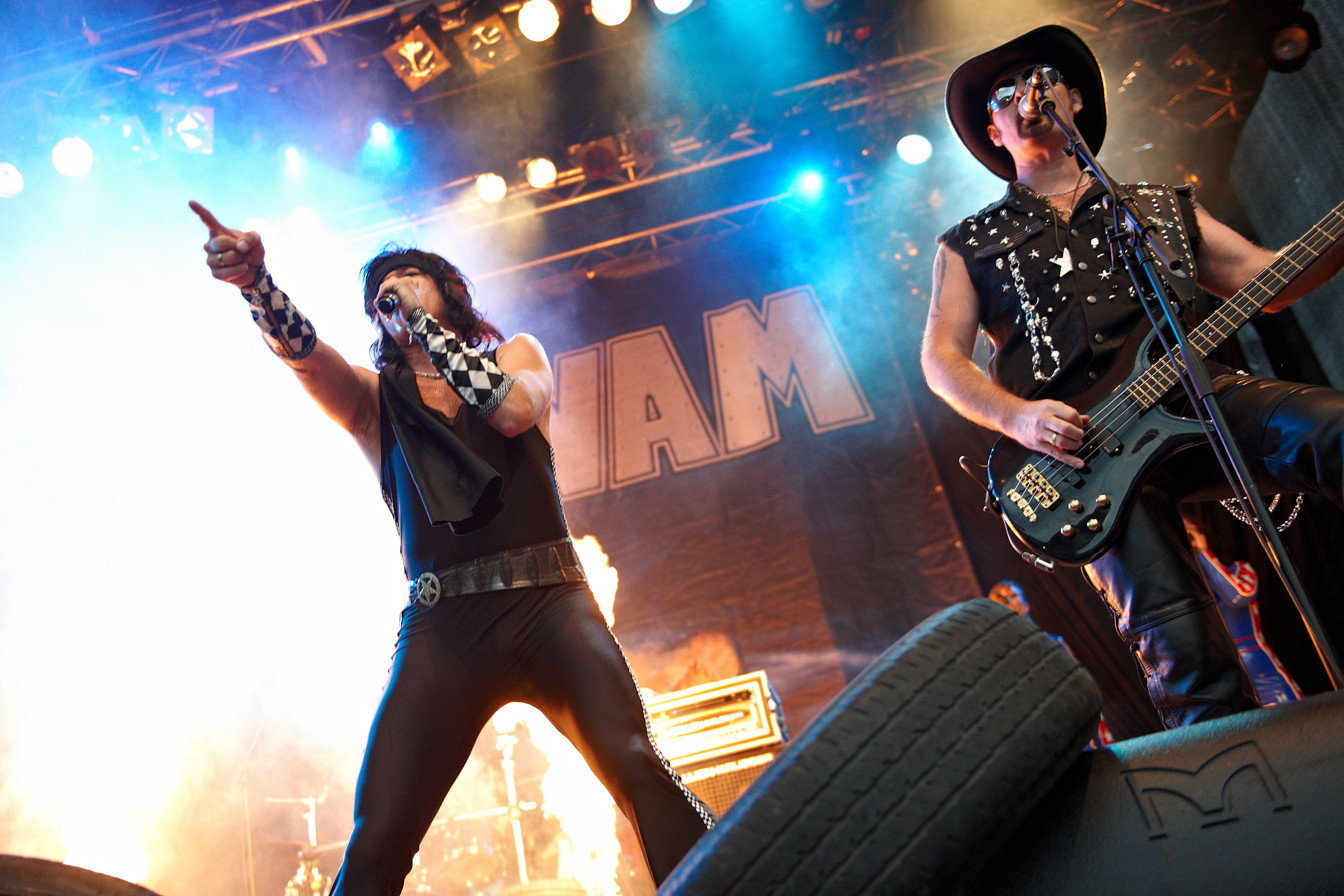
- Wig Wam performing live in 2010

Background information
- Origin: Halden, Norway
- Genres: Glam metal; hard rock
- Years active: 2001–2014, 2019–present
- Labels: Frontiers Records
- Members: Glam (Åge Sten Nilsen); Teeny (Trond Holter); Flash (Bernt Jansen); Sporty (Øystein Andersen)
- Website: wigwamofficial.com

Wig Wam is a Norwegian glam metal band formed in Halden in 2001. Wig Wam's lineup—consisting of vocalist Glam (Åge Sten Nilsen), guitarist Teeny (Trond Holter), bassist Flash (Bernt Jansen) and drummer Sporty (Øystein Andersen)—has remained unchanged since the band's formation. The band's style mixes glam metal and hard rock with humorous lyrics and imagery.

Wig Wam had their international breakthrough in 2005 when they represented Norway in the Eurovision Song Contest held in Kyiv and placed ninth with the song "In My Dreams". Wig Wam split up in 2014, but reunited in 2019. The band enjoyed a resurgence in 2022 when James Gunn chose their song "Do Ya Wanna Taste It" as the opening theme for the first season of the HBO Max television series Peacemaker and featured "In My Dreams" on the soundtrack. Wig Wam has released six studio albums as of 2023. The band's slogan is: "Rock is the new schlager".

== History ==
Wig Wam was formed in Halden in 2001 as a session band for a club and originally played covers of songs by bands from the 1970s and 1980s, including Van Halen, Kiss, Led Zeppelin, The Who and Mötley Crüe. After a successful show at a 1980s-themed party, the band was booked for several more shows and started touring extensively throughout the south of Norway, quickly becoming one of the country's most popular live bands. Wig Wam's fan base would later be known as Wig Wamaniacs. After establishing themselves as a live band, the band started writing original songs and released their debut album 667.. The Neighbour of the Beast in 2004.

The band competed in the Norwegian Eurovision final in 2004 and placed third with the song "Crazy Things". A year later they represented Norway in the Eurovision Song Contest 2005 with the song "In My Dreams", becoming the first metal band to perform at the contest, and placed ninth. The song would go on to become a successful hit in Norway, peaking for three weeks at the top of the national single chart, an achievement neither of Norway's two previous Eurovision winners had managed, and also enjoyed commercial success in Scandinavia. Following Eurovision, Wig Wam toured extensively in Europe. Later in 2005, Wig Wam recorded a cover of "I Was Made For Lovin' You" in collaboration with Bruce Kulick for the Kiss tribute album Gods of Thunder: A Norwegian Tribute to Kiss.

Wig Wam released their second studio album Wig Wamania in 2006 and embarked on a tour in support of the album. The band's show at Shibuya O-East in February 2007 was recorded and filmed for the release of the live album Live in Tokyo and video album Made in Japan later that year. The band released their third studio album Non Stop Rock'n Roll in 2010 and opened for Kiss at Valhall in Oslo in june that same year. Wig Wam's fourth studio album Wall Street was released in 2012. In 2014, the band announced that the members would part ways after thirteen years together. Wig Wam reunited in 2019 and released their fifth studio album Never Say Die in 2021. Restrictions due to the COVID-19 pandemic made it difficult to promote the album with limited media appearances and live performances.

In January 2022, HBO Max released the television series Peacemaker which featured the band's song "Do Ya Wanna Taste It" as the opening theme and also included "In My Dreams" on the soundtrack. While Wig Wam had been dropped by their booking agency shortly before the show's release, it proved popular enough to spearhead a career resurgence for the band. The band appeared on festivals in Norway and Europe once the COVID restrictions had been lifted later in 2022. A summer tour of the United States was planned, but delayed to 2023 after difficulties with acquiring work visas. In 2023, the band released their sixth studio album Out of the Dark. Wig Wam toured the United States for the first time later that year and fulfilled a long-held dream of performing at the Whisky a Go Go.

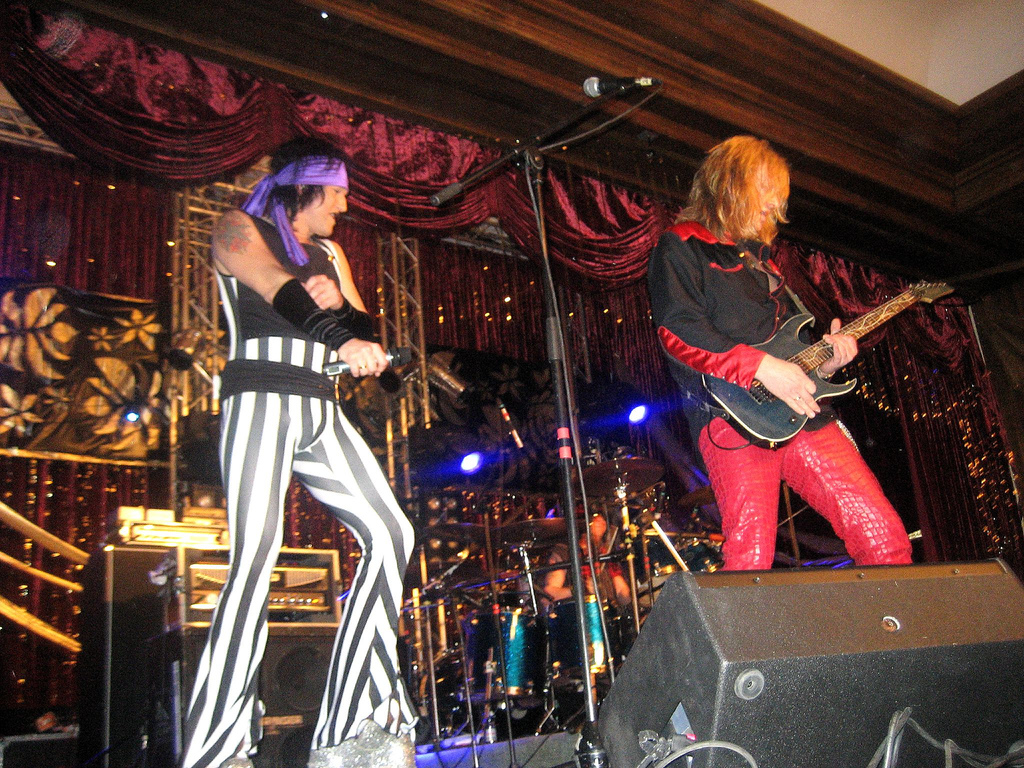
Wig Wam performing in 2007

== Style and influences ==
Wig Wam's musical style is a combination of classic rock, hard rock and glam metal, with their music being described by Billboard as "glitter-soaked, tongue-firmly-in-cheek hard rock." The band's music and imagery are influenced by Kiss, Sweet, T. Rex, Slade, Queen, Aerosmith, Elvis Presley and the Beatles, among others. The members use stage names, as well as glam-inspired stage makeup and outfits. The band's name is taken from the Sweet song "Wig-Wam Bam".

== Band members ==
- Glam (Åge Sten Nilsen) — vocals
- Teeny (Trond Holter) — guitar
- Flash (Bernt Jansen) — bass guitar
- Sporty (Øystein Andersen) — drums
- Lasse Finbråten — keyboards (live)

== Discography ==
Studio albums

- 667.. The Neighbour of the Beast (2004) (reissued in 2005 as Hard to Be a Rock'n Roller)
- Wig Wamania (2006)
- Non Stop Rock'n Roll (2010)
- Wall Street (2012)
- Never Say Die (2021)
- Out of the Dark (2023)

Preceded by Knut Anders Sørum with "High"	Norway in the Eurovision Song Contest; 2005	Succeeded by Christine Guldbrandsen with "Alvedansen"
